= Third mate =

Merchant marine rank

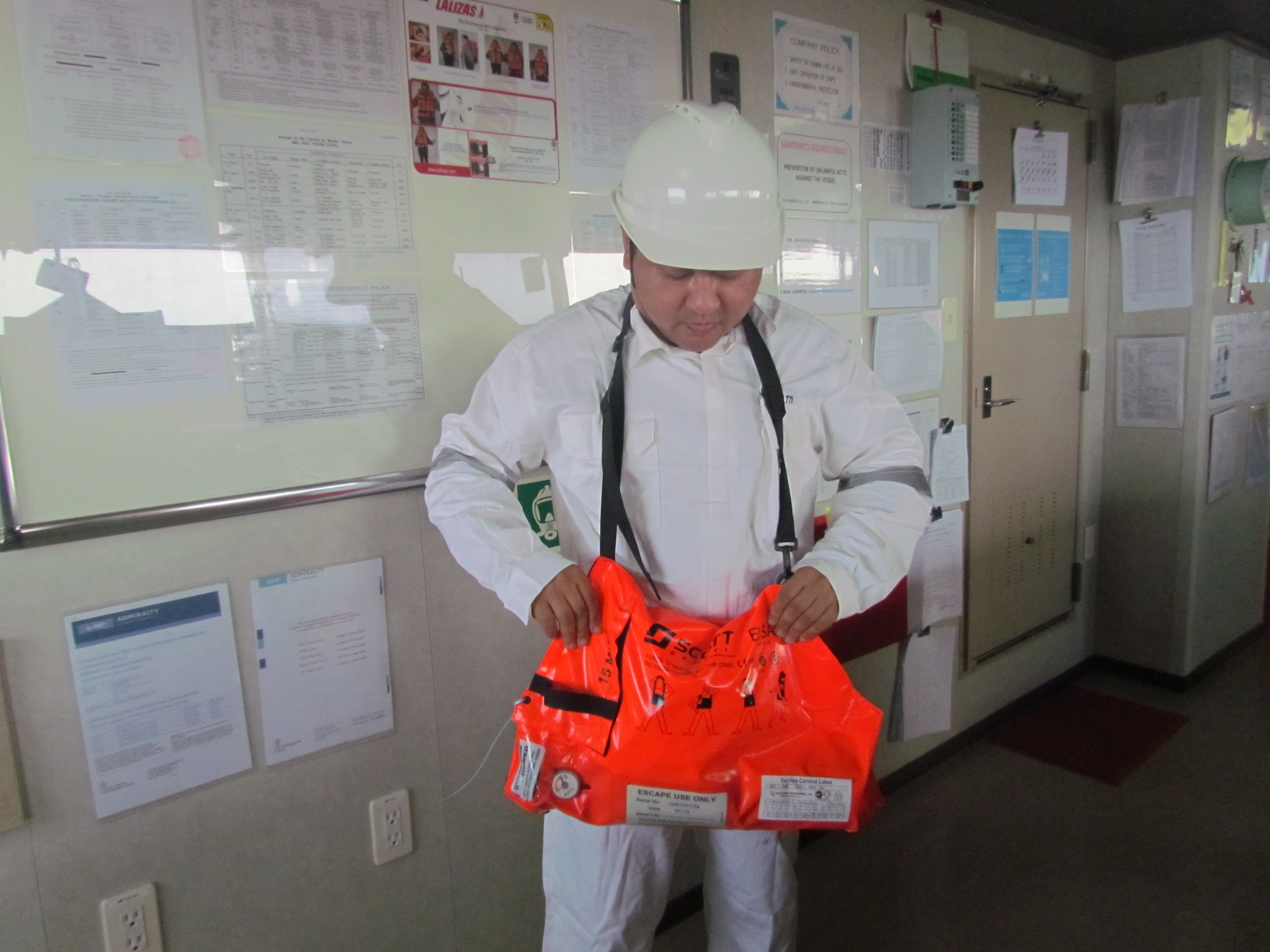
- The 3rd mate is often the ship's safety officer.

General
- Other names: Third officer
- Department: Deck department
- Duties: Safety officer
- Requirements: 3rd Mate's License

Watchstanding
- Watch (at sea): Mate on watch (8-12, 20-24)
- Watch (in port): Mate on watch (6-12, 18-24)

A third mate (3/M) or third officer is a licensed member of the deck department of a merchant ship. The third mate is a watchstander and customarily the ship's safety officer and fourth-in-command (fifth on some ocean liners). The position is junior to a second mate. Other duties vary depending on the type of ship, its crewing, and other factors.

Duties related to the role of safety officer focus on responsibility for items such as firefighting equipment, lifeboats, and various other emergency systems.

== Watchstanding ==
International Maritime Organization (IMO) regulations require the officer be fluent in the English language. This is required for a number of reasons. Examples include the ability to read charts and nautical publications, understand weather and safety messages, communicate with other ships and coast stations, and to successfully interact with a multi-lingual crew.

=== General watchstanding ===
==== Emergencies ====
Emergencies can happen at any time. The officer must be ready at all times to safeguard passengers and crew. After a collision or grounding, the mate must be able to take initial action, perform damage assessment and control, and understand the procedures for rescuing persons from the sea, assisting ships in distress, and responding to any emergency which may arise in port.

The officer must understand distress signals and know the IMO Merchant Ship Search and Rescue Manual.

==== Controlling ship operations ====
The officer has special responsibilities to keep the ship, the people on board and the environment safe. This includes keeping the ship seaworthy during fire and loss of stability, and providing aid and maintaining safety during man overboard, abandoning ship, and medical emergencies.

Understanding ship's stability, trim, stress, and the basics of ship's construction is a key to keeping a ship seaworthy. The mate must know what to do in cases of flooding and loss of buoyancy. Fire is also a constant concern. Knowing the classes and chemistry of fire, fire-fighting appliances and systems prepares the officer to act fast in case of fire.

An officer must be expert in the use of survival craft and rescue boats, their launching appliances and arrangements, and their equipment including radio life-saving appliances, satellite EPIRBs, SARTs, immersion suits and thermal protective aids. In case it is necessary to abandon ship, it is important to be expert in the techniques for survival at sea.

Officers are trained to perform medical tasks and to follow instructions given by radio or obtained from guides. This training includes what to do in case of common shipboard accidents and illnesses.

=== Sea watch ===
At sea, the mate on watch has three fundamental duties: to navigate the ship, to safely avoid traffic, and to respond to any emergencies that may arise. Mates generally stand watch with able seamen who act as helmsman and lookout. The helmsman executes turns and the lookout reports dangers such as approaching ships. These roles are often combined to a single helmsman/lookout and, under some circumstances, can be eliminated completely. The ability to smartly handle a ship is key to safe watchstanding. A ship's draught, trim, speed and under-keel clearance all affect its turning radius and stopping distance. Other factors include the effects of wind and current, squat, shallow water and similar effects. Ship handling is key when the need arises to rescue a person overboard, to anchor, or to moor the ship.

The officer must also be able to transmit and receive signals by Morse light and to use the International Code of Signals.

==== Navigation ====
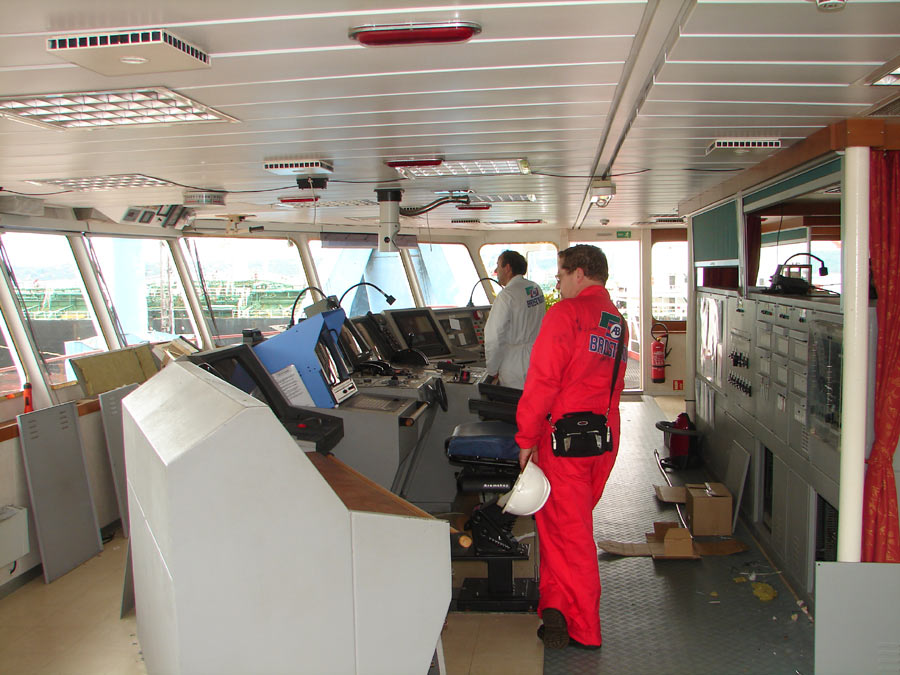
While a ship is underway, the officers navigate it, typically in three shifts or watches.

Celestial, terrestrial, electronic, and coastal navigation techniques are used to fix a ship's position on a navigational chart. Accounting for effects of winds, tides, currents and estimated speed, the officer directs the helmsman to keep to track. The officer uses supplemental information from nautical publications, such as Sailing Directions, tide tables, Notices to Mariners, and radio navigational warnings to keep the ship clear of danger in transit.

Safety demands the mate be able to quickly solve steering control problems and to calibrate the system for optimum performance. Since magnetic and gyrocompasses show the course to steer, the officer must be able to determine and correct for compass errors.

Weather's profound effect on ships requires the officer be able to interpret and apply meteorological information from all available sources. This requires expertise in weather systems, reporting procedures and recording systems.

==== Traffic management ====
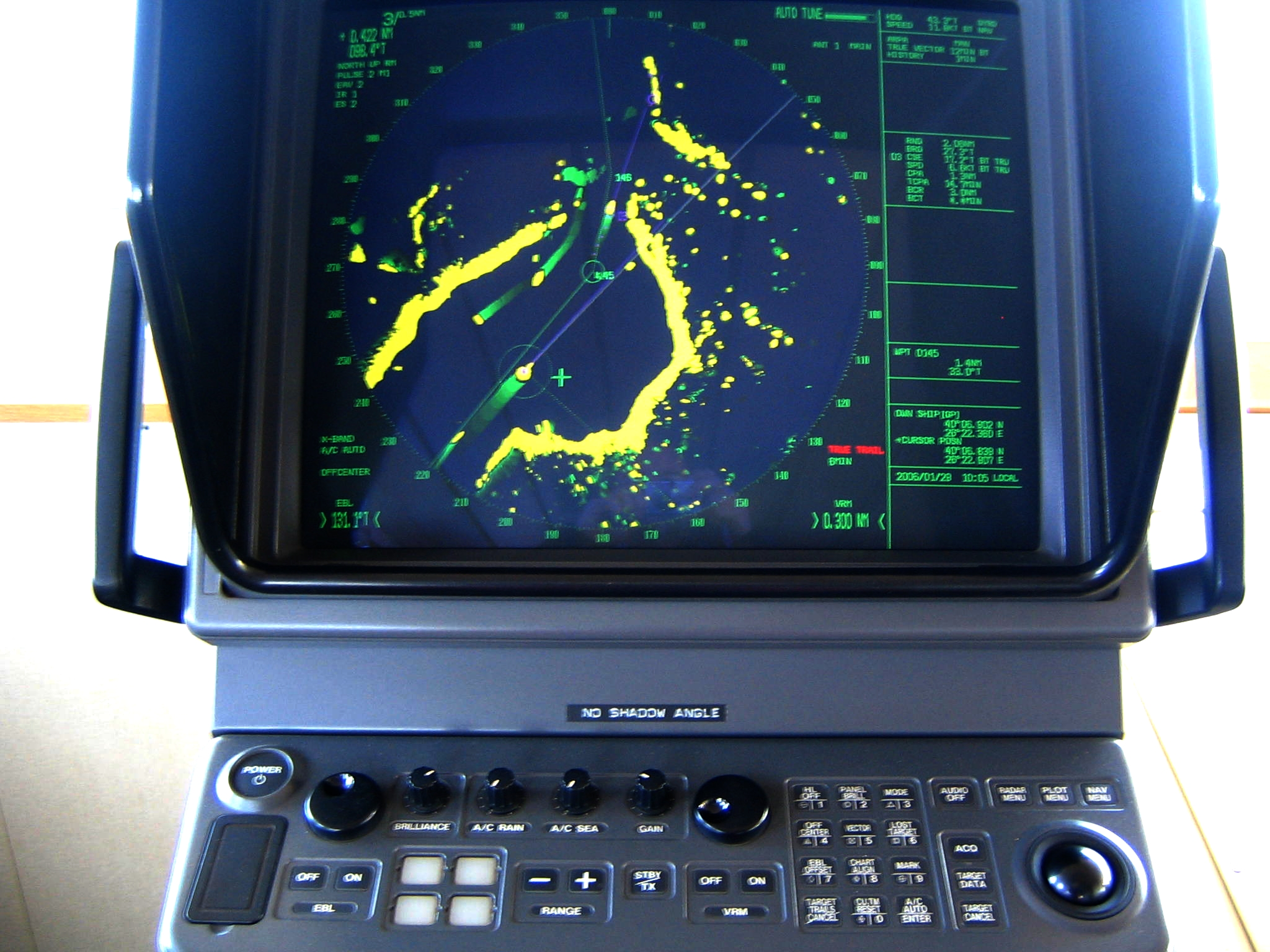
Avoiding collisions can be challenging in heavy traffic.

The International Regulations for Preventing Collisions at Sea are a cornerstone of safe watchkeeping. Safety requires one lives these rules and follows the principles of safe watchkeeping. An emerging focus in watchkeeping is maximizing bridge teamwork, including the practice of Bridge Resource Management.

The main purpose for Radar and Automatic Radar Plotting Aids (ARPA) on a ship's bridge is to move safely among other vessels. These instruments help to accurately judge information about prominent objects in the vicinity, such as:

- range, bearing, course and speed,
- time and distance of closest point of approach, and
- course and speed changes.

These factors help the officer apply the COLREGS to safely maneuver in the vicinity of obstructions and other ships.

Radar has a number of limitations, and ARPA inherits those limitations and adds a number of its own. Factors such as rain, high seas, and dense clouds can prevent radar from detecting other vessels. Moreover, dense traffic and course and speed changes can confuse ARPA units. Finally, human errors such as inaccurate speed inputs and confusion between true and relative vectors add to the limitations of the radar/ARPA suite.

Under the best conditions, the radar operator must be able to optimize system settings and detect divergences between an ARPA system and reality. Information obtained from radar and ARPA must be treated with scrutiny: over reliance on these systems has sunk ships. The officer must understand system performance, limitations and accuracy, tracking capabilities and limitations, and processing delays, and the use of operational warnings and system tests.

=== In-port watch ===
In port, the watch focuses on duties such as cargo operations, fire watches, security watches, monitoring communications, and monitoring the anchor or mooring lines.

==== Cargo handling ====
The ship's officer must be able to oversee the loading, stowage, securing and unloading of cargoes. He must also understand the care of cargo during the voyage.

Of particular importance is knowledge of the effect of cargo including heavy lifts on the seaworthiness and stability of the ship. The officer must also understand safe handling, stowage and securing of cargoes, including cargoes that are dangerous, hazardous or harmful.

== Safety officer ==
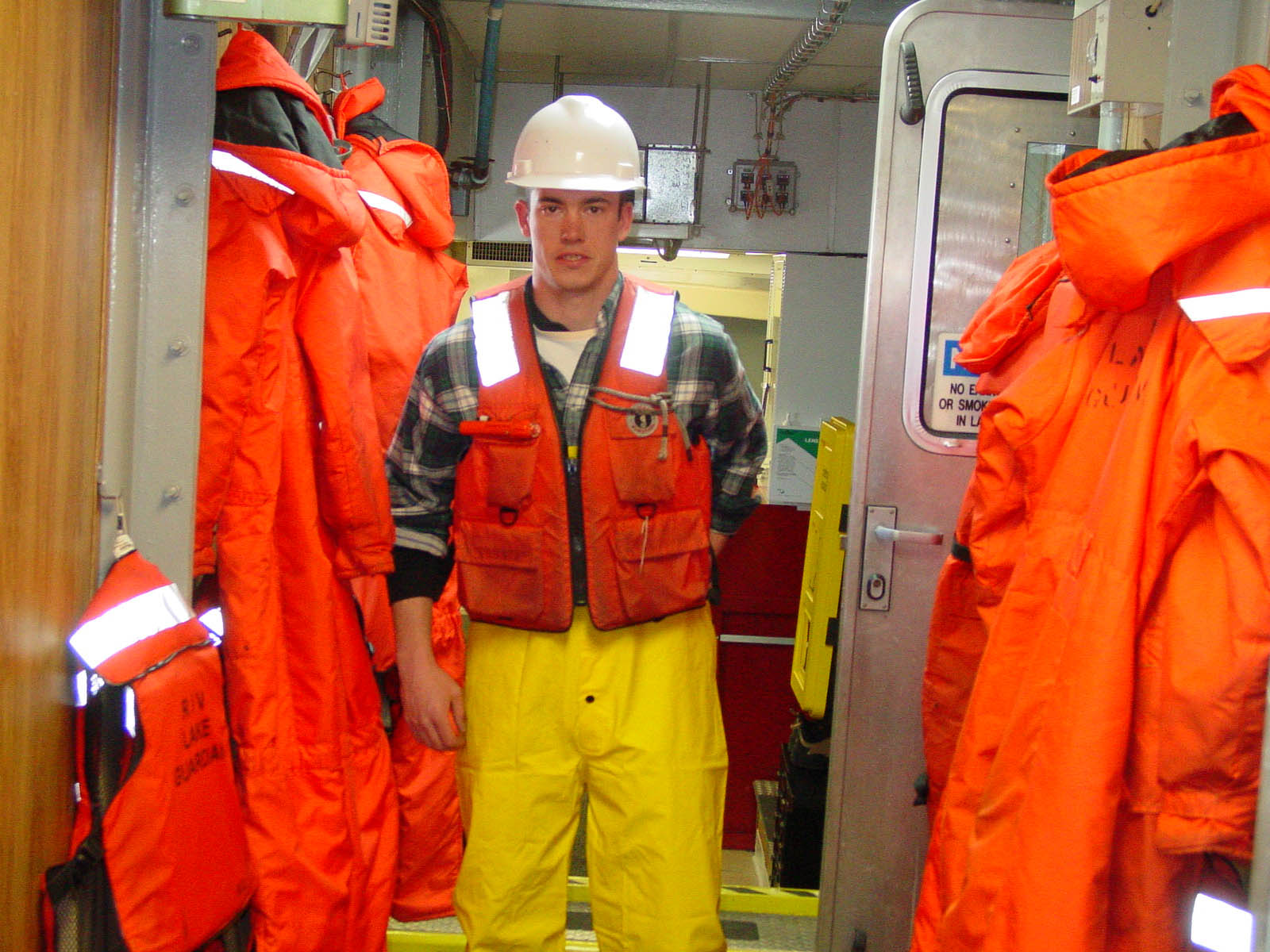
Demonstration of wearing a life vest for safety especially on abandoning ship.

The third mate is usually responsible for the upkeep of lifesaving and firefighting equipment. This includes a responsibility for some or all of the ship's boats, and particularly the lifeboats.

The third mate is also generally an active participant in fire and boat drills.

Large passenger vessels such as cruise ships usually carry a separate safety officer, who commonly ranks with the first officers.

== Working conditions ==
Merchant mariners spend extended periods at sea. Most deep-sea mariners are hired for one or more voyages that last for several months. The length of time between voyages varies depending on job availability and personal preference.

At sea, these workers usually stand watch for 4 hours and are off for 8 hours, 7 days a week.

People in water transportation occupations work in all weather conditions. Although merchant mariners try to avoid severe storms while at sea, working in damp and cold conditions is inevitable. While it is uncommon nowadays for vessels to suffer disasters such as fire, explosion, or a sinking, workers face the possibility that they may have to abandon their craft at short notice if it collides with other vessels or runs aground. They also risk injury or death from falling overboard and hazards associated with working with machinery, heavy loads, and dangerous cargo. However, modern safety management procedures, advanced emergency communications, and effective international rescue systems place modern mariners in a much safer position.

Most newer vessels are air-conditioned, soundproofed from noisy machinery, and equipped with comfortable living quarters. For some mariners, these amenities have helped ease the sometimes difficult circumstances of long periods away from home. Also, modern communications, especially email, link modern mariners to their families. Nevertheless, some mariners dislike the long periods away from home and the confinement aboard ship and consequently leave the occupation.

== National details ==
=== United Kingdom ===
Initial Officer of the Watch (OOW) Certification in the United Kingdom can be achieved through the various training programme options, these are;

MNTB Deck Officer Cadet training programme (Degree Route), leading to the following qualifications: Foundation Degree (FdSc) in Marine Operations Direct pathway to BSc (Hons) Marine Operations Management MCA STCW’95 II/I OOW certification

MNTB Deck Officer Cadet training programme (HND Route), leading to the following qualifications: Higher National Diploma (HND) in Nautical Science NVQ Level 3 in Merchant Vessel Operations MCA STCW’95 II/I OOW certification

Alternative training programmes for Experienced Seafarers (Examination or NVQ Level 3 Routes), leading to the following qualifications: MCA STCW’95 II/I OOW certification HND Part I in Nautical Science

All entry routes require the UK candidate to have successfully undertaken STCW'95 safety and certification training in the following; Personal Survival Techniques, Fire Prevention and Firefighting, Elementary First Aid, Personal Safety & Social Responsibilities, Proficiency in Medical First Aid Aboard Ship, Proficiency in Survival Craft & Rescue Boats, Advanced Firefighting, Efficient Deck Hand, MCA Signals Examination, GMDSS General Operator's Certificate and Navigation Radar & ARPA Simulation Training (Operational Level)

Since the first half of the 20th century, the usual terminology in the British Merchant Navy has been "third officer" rather than "third mate", although "third mate" may be used colloquially.

=== United States ===
==== Licensing ====
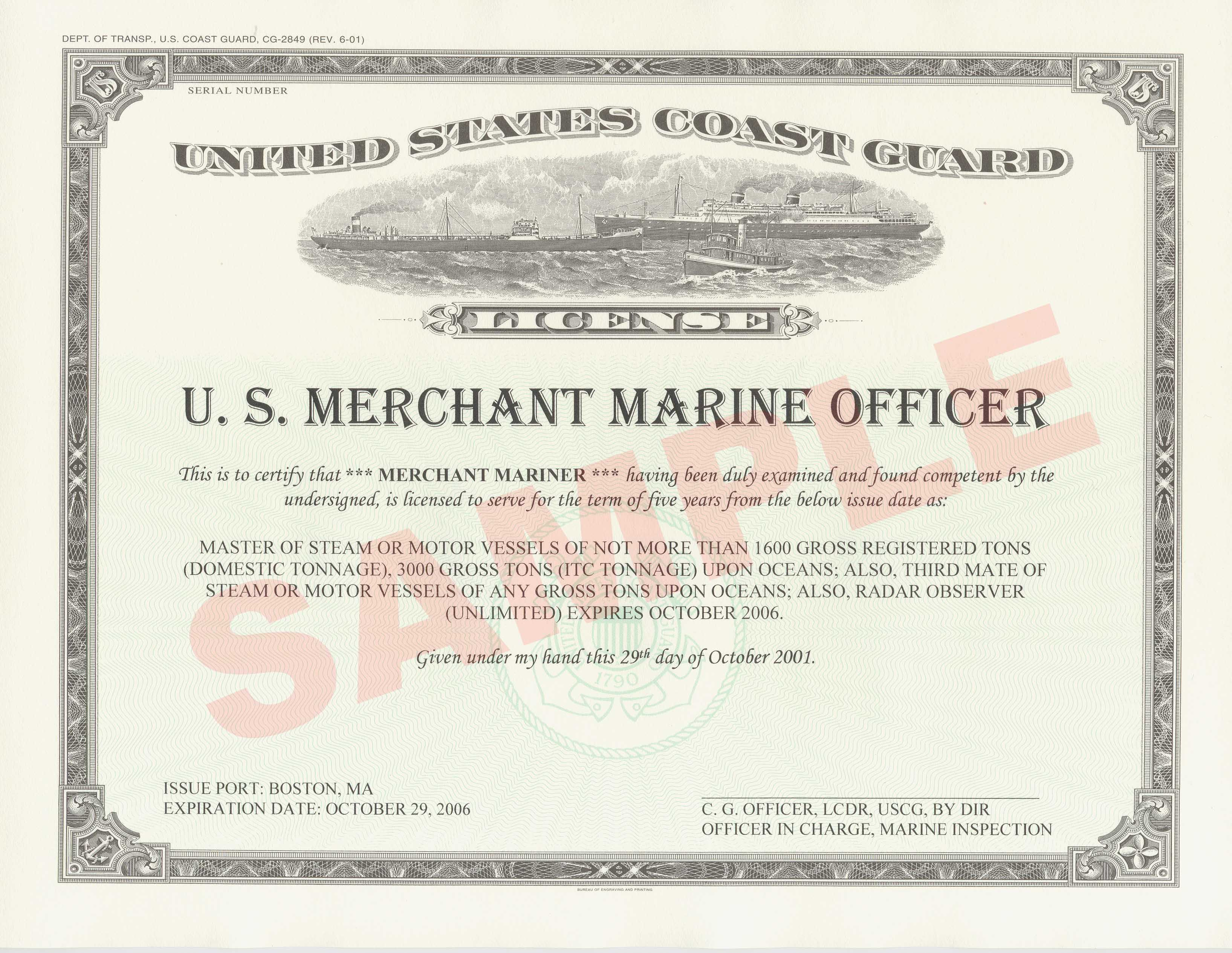
A third mate must have a number of qualifications, including a license.

There are two methods to attain an unlimited third mate's license in the United States: to attend a specialized training institution, or to accumulate "sea time" and take a series of training classes and examinations.

Training institutions that can lead to a third mate's license include the U.S. Merchant Marine Academy (deck curriculum), or any of the other state maritime colleges. The Coast Guard Academy does not give licenses to its graduating cadets.

A seafarer may start the process of attaining a license after three years of service in the deck department on ocean steam or motor vessels, at least six months of which as able seaman, boatswain, or quartermaster. Then the seafarer takes required training courses and completes on-board assessments. Finally, the mariner can apply to the United States Coast Guard for a Third Mate's license.

A master of 1,600-ton vessels can, under certain circumstances, begin the application process for an unlimited third mate's license.

If approved the applicant must then successfully pass a comprehensive license examination before being issued the license. Hawsepiper is an informal term referring to an officer who did not attend a maritime college or academy and began his or her career as a seafarer. The term derives from the ship’s hawsepipe: the pipe passing through the bow section of a ship that the anchor chain passes through. "Coming up through the hawsepipe" is a nautical metaphor for climbing up the ship's rank structure.

Some maritime unions offer their membership the required training for career advancement, such as the American Maritime Officers RTM-STAR Center and the Paul Hall Center for Maritime Training and Education administered by the Seafarers International Union of North America. Similarly, some employers offer financial assistance to pay for the training for their employees. Otherwise, the mariner is responsible for the cost of the required training.

Since the requirements of STCW '95 have been enacted, there have been complaints that the hawsepiper career path has been made too difficult. Examples include the cost in time and money to meet formal classroom training requirements. Critics assert that the newer requirements will eventually lead to a shortage of qualified mariners, especially in places like the United States.

==== Working conditions ====
The rate of unionization for these workers is about 36 percent, much higher than the average for all occupations. Consequently, merchant marine officers and seafarers, both veterans and beginners, are hired for voyages through union hiring halls or directly by shipping companies. Hiring halls rank the candidates by the length of time the person has been out of work and fill open slots accordingly. Hiring halls typically are found in major seaports.

Mates employed on Great Lakes ships work 60 days and have 30 days off, but do not work in the winter when the lakes are frozen. Workers on rivers, on canals, and in harbors are more likely to have year-round work. Some work 8-hour or 12-hour shifts and go home every day. Others work steadily for a week or a month and then have an extended period off. When working, they usually are on duty for 6 or 12 hours and off for 6 or 12 hours. Those on smaller vessels are normally assigned to one vessel and have steady employment.

== Notable Third Mates ==
- Alfred Cheetham served as third officer for Shackleton's 1914 Nimrod Expedition to Antarctica.
- Jack Lord, American television, film, and Broadway actor.
- Gregory Cousins, on watch during Exxon Valdez grounding.
- Charles William Pearson, a pioneer Anglican missionary in Uganda.
- Harry Lundeberg was sailing as third mate during the 1934 West Coast waterfront strike.
- Herbert J. Pitman, third officer on the RMS Titanic
- John Paul Jones, the Scottish 'Father' of the American Navy was the third mate aboard the King George in 1764

== See also ==
- Third officer (aviation)
- Seafarer's professions and ranks
- Merchant Navy
- Ship transport
- United States Merchant Marine
- Nautical chart
- Nautical publications
