= Second mate =

Officer on a merchant ship

General
- Other names: Second officer Able mate
- Department: Deck department
- Location: On board ship
- Licensed: Yes
- Duties: Navigator, GMDSS Officer, Medical Officer
- Requirements: Second mate's Certificate of Competency (COC) by an authorised governing state of the International Maritime Organization (IMO)

Watchstanding
- Watch (at sea): Mate on watch (00:00–04:00, 12:00–16:00)
- Watch (in port): Mate on watch (00:00–06:00, 12:00–18:00)

A second mate (2nd mate) or second officer (2/O) is a licensed member of the deck department of a merchant ship holding a Second Mates Certificate of Competence, by an authorised governing state of the International Maritime Organization (IMO). The second mate is the third in command (or on some ocean liners fourth) and a watchkeeping officer, customarily the ship's navigator. Other duties vary, but the second mate is often the medical officer and in charge of maintaining distress signaling equipment. On oil tankers, the second mate usually assists the chief mate with the cargo operations.

The navigator's role focuses on creating the ship's passage plans. A passage plan is a comprehensive, step by step description of how the voyage is to proceed from berth to berth or one port to another. The plan includes undocking, departure, the en route portion of a voyage, approach, and mooring at the destination.

The GMDSS (Global Maritime Distress and Safety System) officer role consists of performing tests and maintenance, and ensuring the proper log-keeping on the ship's Global Maritime Distress Safety System equipment. Safety equipment includes emergency position-indicating radio beacons, a NAVTEX unit, INMARSAT consoles, various radios, search and rescue transponders, and digital selective calling systems.

== Watchkeeping ==
A second mate is almost always a watchkeeper. In port and at sea, the second mate is responsible to the captain for keeping the ship, its crew, and its cargo safe for eight hours each day. Traditionally, the second mate stands a "12-4" watch: from midnight until 4 a.m. and noon until 4 p.m. On watch, he must enforce all applicable regulations, such as safety of life at sea and pollution regulations. In port, the watch focuses on duties such as cargo operations, fire and security watches, monitoring communications, and the anchor or mooring lines.

International Maritime Organization (IMO) regulations require the officer be fluent in English. This is required for a number of reasons, such as to use charts and nautical publications, understand weather and safety messages, communication with other ships and coast stations, and to be able to work with a multi-lingual crew.

== Sea watch ==
At sea, the mate on watch has three fundamental duties: to navigate the ship, to safely avoid traffic, and to respond to emergencies. Mates generally stand watch with able seamen who act as helmsman and lookout. The helmsman executes turns and the lookout reports dangers such as approaching ships. These roles are often combined to a single helmsman/lookout and, under some circumstances, can be eliminated completely. The ability to smartly handle a ship is key to safe watchstanding. A ship's draught, trim, speed and under-keel clearance all affect its turning radius and stopping distance. Other factors include the effects of wind and current, squat, shallow water, and similar effects. Shiphandling is key when the need arises to rescue a man overboard, to anchor, or to moor the ship.

The officer must also be able to transmit and receive signals by Morse light and to use the International Code of Signals.

=== Officer in charge of navigational equipment and other aids to navigation ===
On the ship the second officer is the officer that works under the master, i.e. the captain of the ship, and shoulders the responsibility of checking the functionality of all the navigational equipment, such as the echo-sounder, radar, ECDIS, AIS, and on some vessels even the GMDSS radio equipment; however, recently it has been observed that companies tend to designate the responsibility of maintaining the GMDSS equipment to the third officer. These checks are made in according to the companies' planned maintenance system. In addition, these checks are usually made prior to arrival and departure ports. Often if any navigational equipment is suspected of being faulty then it should be checked that the equipment is in working order as per the given performance standards. Correction of navigation charts and the duties of keeping the charts up to date rests on the second mate.

=== Navigation ===
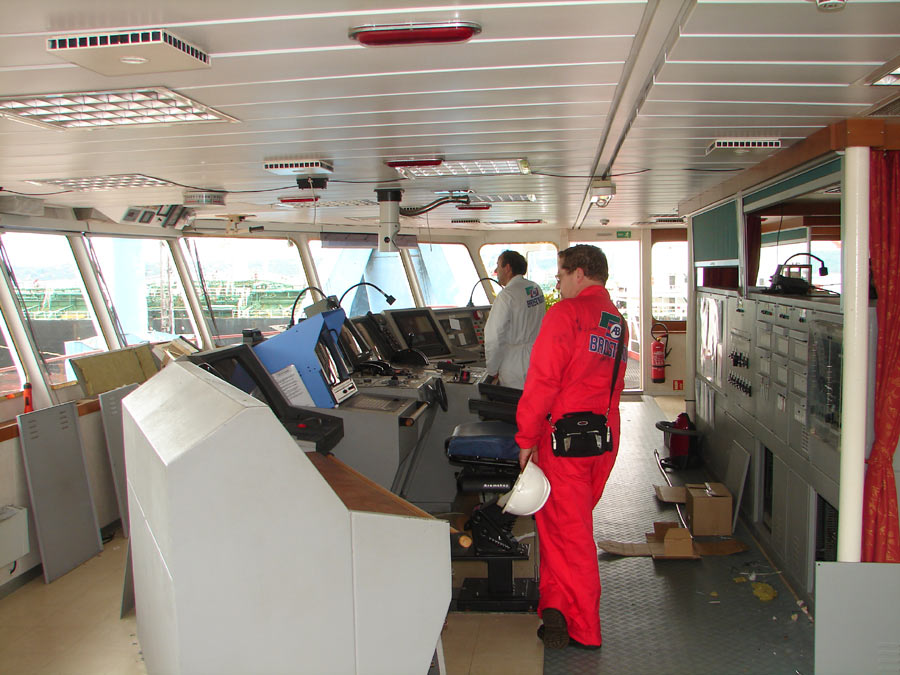
While a ship is under way, the officers navigate it, typically in three shifts or watches.

Celestial, terrestrial, electronic, and coastal navigation techniques are used to fix a ship's position on a navigational chart. Accounting for effects of winds, tides, currents and estimated speed, the officer directs the helmsman to keep to track. The officer uses supplemental information from nautical publications, such as sailing directions, tide tables, notices to mariners, and radio navigational warnings to keep the ship clear of danger in transit.

Safety demands the mate be able to quickly solve steering control problems and to calibrate the system for optimum performance. Since magnetic and gyrocompasses show the course to steer, the officer must be able to determine and correct for compass errors.

Weather's profound effect on ships requires the officer be able to interpret and apply meteorological information from all available sources. This requires expertise in weather systems, reporting procedures, and recording systems.

=== Traffic management ===
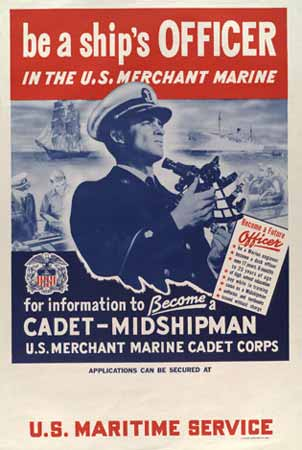
Mates were in high demand during World War II.

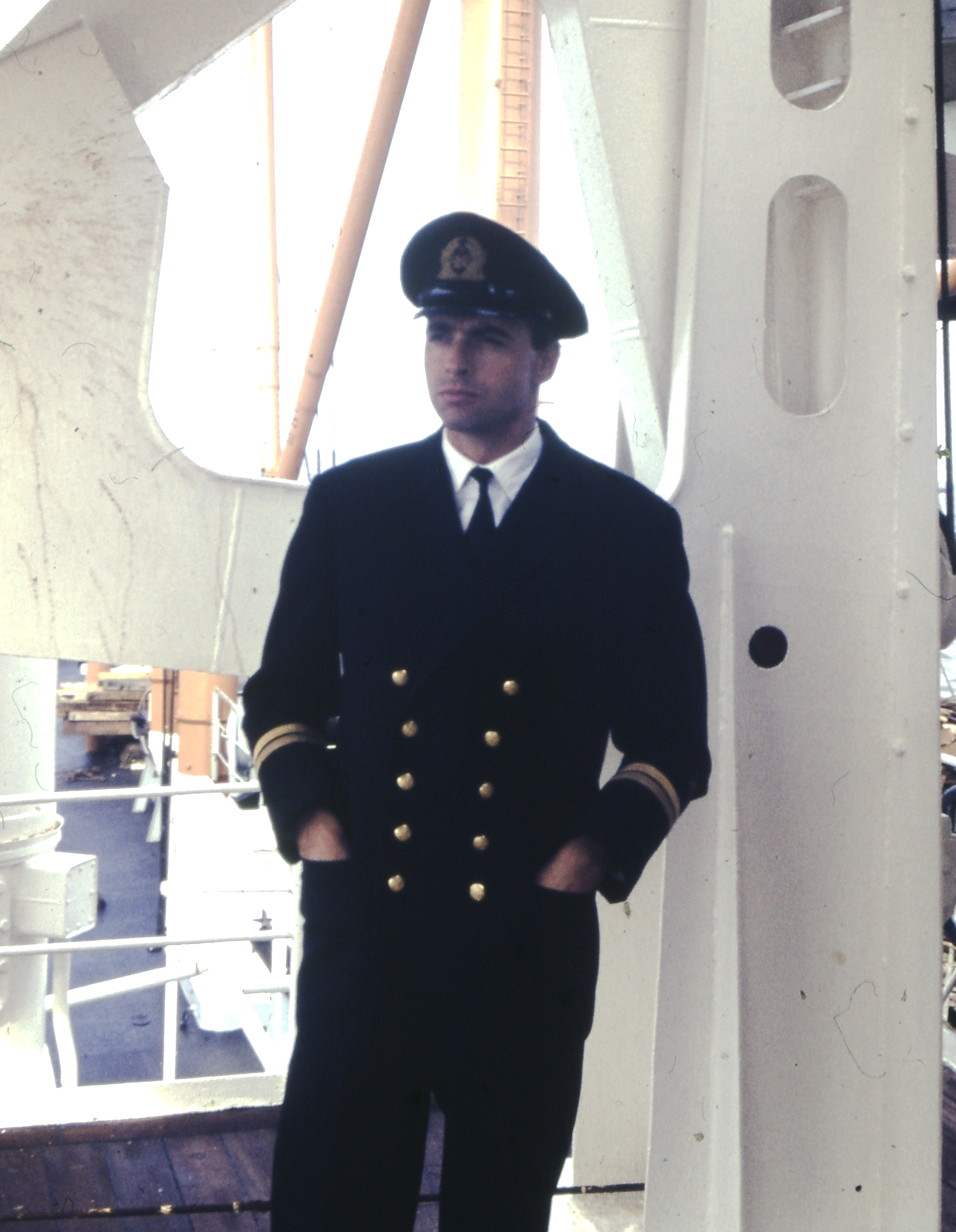
2nd Mate of a cargo ship of the NDL, 1966. During this time, he was responsible for all freight operation of the cargo freighter

The International Regulations for Preventing Collisions at Sea are a cornerstone of safe watchkeeping. Safety requires that one live these rules and follow the principles of safe watchkeeping. Maximizing bridge teamwork, including bridge resource management is an emerging focus in watchkeeping.

The main purpose for radar and automatic radar plotting aid (ARPA) on a ship's bridge are to move safely among other vessels. These tools help to accurately judge information about prominent objects in the vicinity, such as

- range, bearing, course and speed;
- time and distance of closest point of approach; and
- course and speed changes.

These factors help the officer apply the COLREGS to safely maneuver in the vicinity of obstructions and other ships.

Unfortunately, radar has a number of limitations, and ARPA inherits those limitations and adds a number of its own. Factors such as rain, high seas, and dense clouds can prevent radar from detecting other vessels. Conditions such as dense traffic and course and speed changes can confuse ARPA units. Finally, human errors such as inaccurate speed inputs and confusion between true and relative vectors add to the limitations of the radar/ARPA suite.

The radar operator must be able to optimize system settings and detect divergences between an ARPA system and reality. Information obtained from radar and ARPA has to be treated with scrutiny: over reliance on these systems has sunk ships. The officer must understand system performance. Examples include limitations and accuracy, tracking capabilities and limitations, and processing delays, and the use of operational warnings and system tests.

=== Emergencies ===
Emergencies can happen at any time, and the officer must be equipped to safeguard passengers and crew. After a collision or a grounding, the officer must be able to take initial action, perform damage assessment and control, and understand the procedures for rescuing persons from the sea, assisting ships in distress, and responding to any emergency which may arise in port.

The officer must understand distress signals and know the IMO Merchant Ship Search and Rescue Manual.

== Cargo handling ==
The ship's officer must be able to oversee the loading, stowage, securing and unloading of cargoes. Requirements include understanding the care of cargo during the voyage.

Of particular importance is knowledge of the effect of cargo including heavy lifts on the seaworthiness and stability of the ship. The officer must also understand safe handling, stowage and securing of cargoes, including cargoes that are dangerous, hazardous or harmful.

== Controlling ship operations ==
The officer has special responsibilities to keep the ship, the people on board and the environment safe. This includes keeping the ship seaworthy during fire and loss of stability, and providing aid and maintaining safety during man overboard, abandoning ship, and medical emergencies.

Understanding ship's stability, trim, stress, and the basics of ship's construction is a key to keeping a ship seaworthy. Competencies include knowing what to do in cases of flooding and loss of buoyancy. Fire is also a constant concern. Knowing the classes and chemistry of fire, fire-fighting appliances, and systems prepares the officer to act fast in case of fire.

An officer must be expert in the use of survival craft and rescue boats, along with their launching appliances and arrangements. The officer must also be skilled with their equipment, which includes life-saving radio appliances such as satellite EPIRBs and SARTs, as well as protective gear like immersion suits and thermal protective aids. Understanding techniques for survival at sea is critical in case it becomes necessary to abandon ship.

Officers are trained to perform medical tasks and to follow instructions given by radio or obtained from guides. This training includes what to do in case of common shipboard accidents and illnesses.

== Licensing ==
=== United Kingdom ===
It is usual for a second officer to hold a chief officer's certificate. Since the first half of the 20th century, the usual terminology in the British Merchant Navy has been "second officer" rather than "second mate", although "second mate" may be used colloquially.

=== United States ===
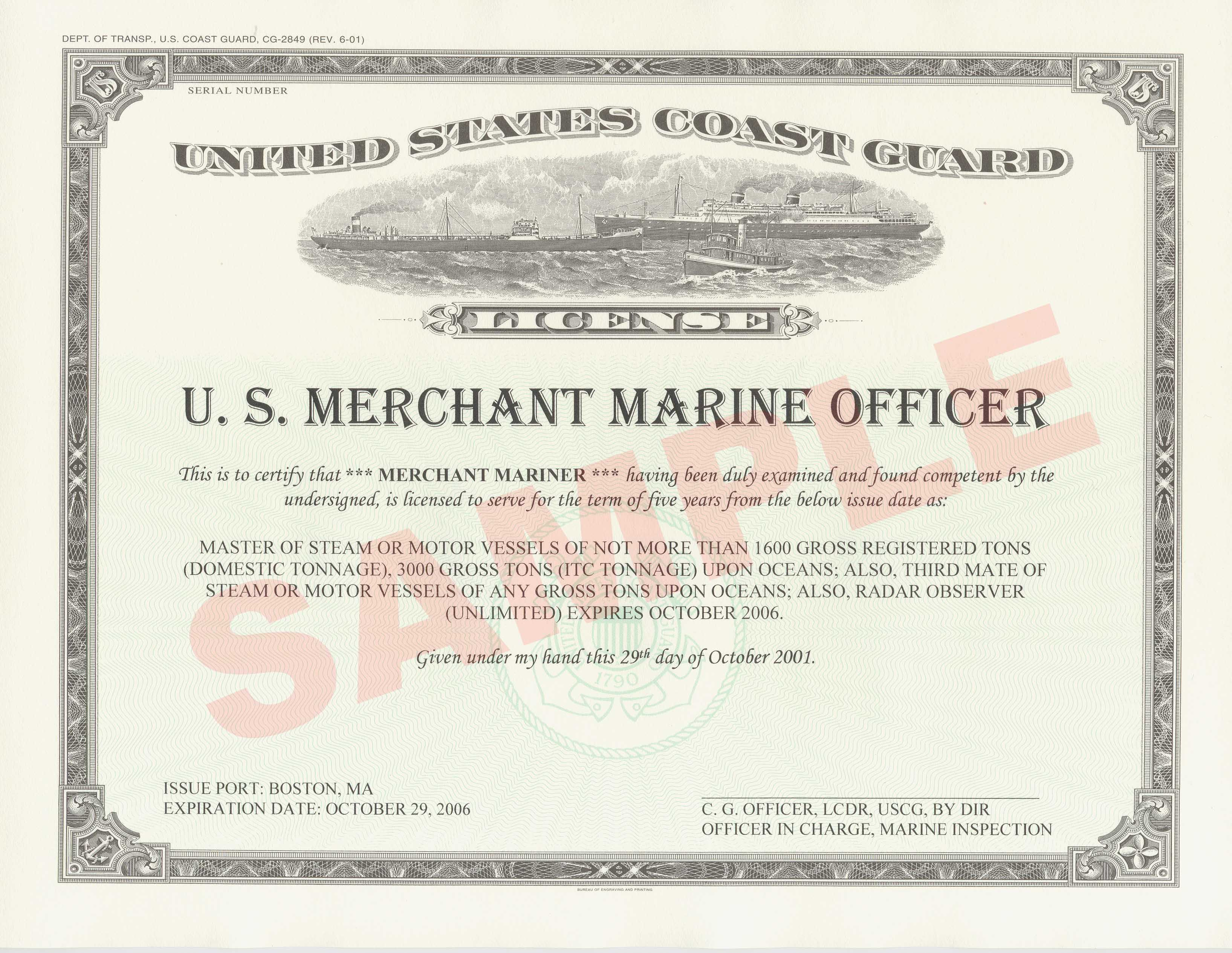
A second mate must have a number of qualifications, including a license.

To become a second mate (unlimited) in the United States, one must have been a third mate and have at least 360 days of service while holding that license. Third mates who attained their licenses after the implementation of STCW 95 have passed all the examination topics required for the second mate's license, and can automatically claim the second mate's license after documenting the required service. Third mates who attained their licenses before STCW 95 must meet additional requirements.

There are two methods to attain an unlimited third mate's license in the United States: to attend a specialized training institution, or to accumulate "sea time" and take a series of training classes and examinations.

Training institutions that can lead to a third mate's license include the U.S. Merchant Marine Academy (deck curriculum), the U.S. Coast Guard Academy, and U.S. Naval Academy with qualification as an under way officer in charge of a navigational watch, any of the state maritime colleges, the Great Lakes Maritime Academy, or a three-year apprentice mate training program approved by the commandant of the U.S. Coast Guard.

A seaman may start the process of attaining a license after three years of service in the deck department on ocean steam or motor vessels, at least six months of which as able seaman, boatswain, or quartermaster. Then the seaman takes required training courses, and completes on-board assessments. Finally, the mariner can apply to the United States Coast Guard for a third mate's license.

A master of 1,600-ton vessels can, under certain circumstances, begin the application process for an unlimited third mate's license.

If approved the applicant must then successfully pass a comprehensive license examination before being issued the license. Hawsepiper is an informal maritime industry term used to refer to an officer who began his or her career as an unlicensed merchant seaman and did not attend a traditional maritime college/academy to earn the officer license. A ship's hawsepipe is the pipe passing through the bow section of a ship that the anchor chain passes through. Hawsepiper refers to climbing up the hawsepipe, a nautical metaphor for climbing up the ship's rank structure. Hawsepiper is considered a positive term when said respectfully. Most hawsepipers are proud of their background and use the term to describe themselves.

Several merchant seamen's unions offer their membership the required training to help them advance. Similarly, some employers offer financial assistance to pay for employee training. Otherwise, the mariner is responsible for the cost of the required training.

There have been complaints that the hawsepiper progression path has been made too difficult since the requirements of STCW 95 have been enacted. Issues include the cost in time and money to meet formal classroom training requirements. Critics assert that the newer requirements will eventually lead to a shortage of qualified mariners, especially in places like the United States.

=== India ===
In India the authority to issue licences rests with the Directorate General of Shipping. To be eligible to receive such a licence a cadet must have worked for the required amount of time and have work experience which should translate into the required amount of seatime prescribed by the administration in accordance with the STCW Code 2010. In addition, he must possess various mandatory training in life saving, survival, fire fighting, and bridge team management, among others. Lastly, he must have cleared the 2MFG written and orals conducted by the various Mercantile Marine Departments, a.k.a. MMD. The for the 2MFG orals a candidate may be examined by a nautical surveyor, deputy nautical advisers or the nautical adviser of India.

== The Age of Sail ==
In the 1840s personal narrative Two Years Before the Mast, the author (Richard Henry Dana Jr.) describes the role of a second mate on an American merchant trading brig as follows:

The role of the second mate officer (or any subordinate officer) was then very much determined by the captain of a ship. Hence, as the author has described, it is not necessarily the case with the officer in other ships. Nowadays, the role of a second officer on board any ship is that of a navigating officer; he is in charge of navigation, navigational equipment and navigational publications. He reports to the captain of the ship. Deck work charge is not expected on a second officer but he may do so. He is a licensed officer.

== See also ==
- Merchant Navy
- Nautical chart
- Nautical publications
- Officer of the Deck
- Passage planning
- Seafarer's professions and ranks
- Second officer (aviation)
- Ship transport
- United States Merchant Marine
