= Chief mate =

Licensed mariner and head of the deck department of a merchant ship

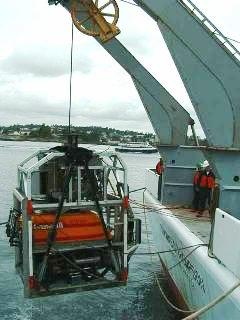
- The chief mate is customarily in charge of the ship's cargo and deck crew.

General
- Other names: Chief officer, first mate, first officer
- Department: Deck department
- Reports to: Captain
- Licensed: Yes
- Duties: Cargo officer, Deck department head.
- Requirements: Chief Mate's License

Watchstanding
- Watchstander: Yes/Depends on shipboard manning requirements
- Watch (at sea): Varies (0400-0800, 1600-2000)
- Watch (in port): Varies (0800-1700)

A chief mate (C/M) or chief officer, usually also synonymous with the first mate or first officer, is a licensed mariner and head of the deck department of a merchant ship. The chief mate is customarily a watchstander and is in charge of the ship's cargo and deck crew. The actual title used will vary by ship's employment, by type of ship, by nationality, and by trade: for instance, chief mate is not usually used in the Commonwealth, although chief officer and first mate are; on passenger ships, the first officer may be a separate position from that of the chief officer that is junior to the latter.

The chief mate answers to the captain for the safety and security of the ship. Responsibilities include the crew's welfare and training in areas such as safety, firefighting, search and rescue.

The mate on a fishing vessel may be called the second hand.

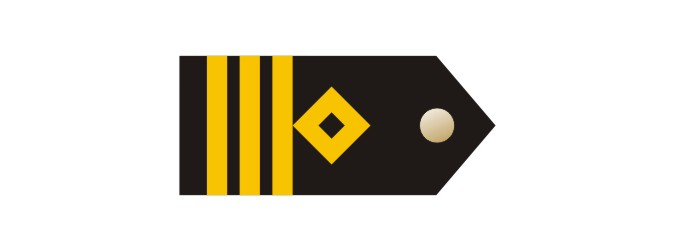
Epaulettes often worn by the chief officer on merchant ships (similar to those worn by a commander)

== Senior onboard operations manager ==
The Chief Mate, who is the second in command of the vessel, is often equated, in corporate terms, to a senior manager for the operations on board, as the Mate is in charge of a number of departmental functions. In modern cargo vessels, the Mate holds appointments like Head of Deck Department, Head of Cargo/Stowage Operations, Head of Safety/Fire Fighting, Head of On-Board Security (Ship Security Officer), Head of Environment and Quality, and so forth.

== Cargo officer ==
As cargo officer, a chief mate oversees the loading, stowage, securing and unloading of cargoes. Moreover, the chief mate is accountable for the care of cargo during the voyage. This includes a general responsibility for the ship's stability and special care for cargoes that are dangerous, hazardous or harmful.

Even under the best of conditions, a ship is balanced precariously upon the water and is subject to a number of forces, such as wind, swells, and storms, which could capsize it. The cargo officer uses tools like ballasting and load balancing to optimize the ship's performance for the expected type of environment.

== Watchstanding ==
Traditionally, the chief mate stands a "4-8" watch: from 4 AM until 8 AM and 4 PM until 8 PM, in port and at sea, the chief mate is responsible to the captain for keeping the ship, crew, and cargo safe. On watch, the mate must enforce all applicable regulations, such as the International Convention for the Safety of Life at Sea and pollution regulations. In port, the watch focuses on duties such as cargo operations, fire and security watches, monitoring communications and the anchor or mooring lines.

IMO regulations require the officer be fluent in English. This is required for a number of reasons, such as ability to use nautical charts and nautical publications, to understand weather and safety messages, communicate with other ships and coast stations, and to be able to work with a multi-lingual crew.

== Sea watch ==
At sea, the mate on watch has three fundamental duties: navigate the ship, safely avoid traffic, and respond to any emergencies that may arise. Mates generally stand watch with able seamen who act as helmsman and lookout. The helmsman executes turns and the lookout reports dangers such as approaching ships. These roles are often combined to a single helmsman/lookout and, under some circumstances, are eliminated. The ability to smartly handle a ship is key to safe watchstanding. A ship's draught, trim, speed and under-keel clearance all affect its turning radius and stopping distance. Other factors include the effects of wind and current, squat, shallow water and similar effects. Shiphandling is key when the need arises to rescue a man overboard, to anchor, or to moor the ship.

The officer must also be able to transmit and receive signals by Morse light and to use the International Code of Signals.

=== Navigation ===
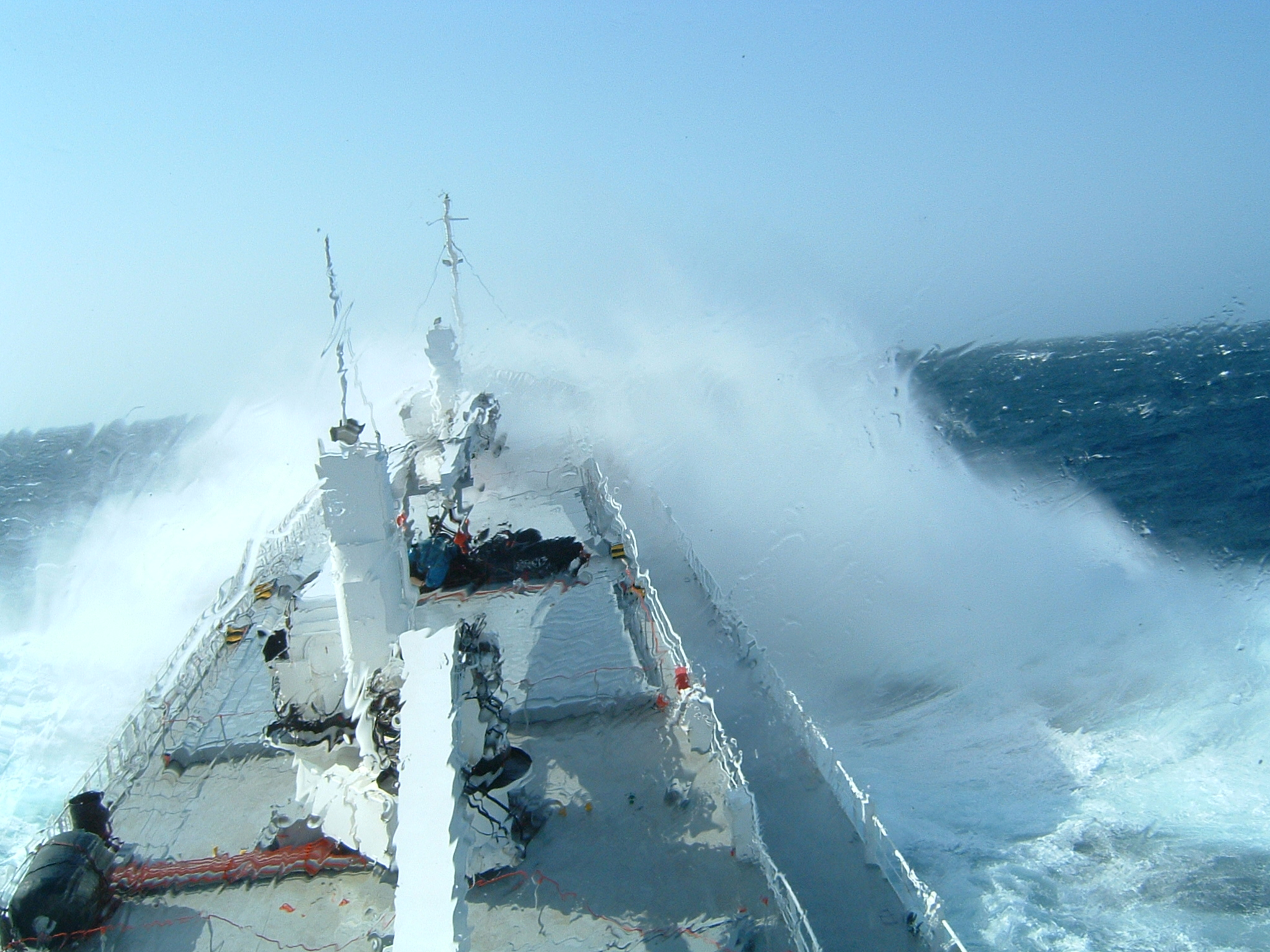
The conditions for navigating a ship can often be challenging.

Celestial, terrestrial, electronic, and coastal navigation techniques are used to fix a ship's position on a navigational chart. The officer directs the helmsman to keep to track, accounting for effects of winds, tides, currents and estimated speed. The officer uses supplemental information from nautical publications, such as Sailing Directions, tide tables, Notices to Mariners, and radio navigational warnings to keep the ship clear of danger in transit.

Safety demands the mate be able to quickly solve steering control problems and to calibrate the system for optimum performance. Since magnetic and gyrocompasses show the course to steer, the officer must be able to determine and correct for compass errors.

Weather's profound effect on ships requires the officer be able to interpret and apply meteorological information from all available sources. This requires expertise in weather systems, reporting procedures and recording systems.

=== Traffic management ===
The International Regulations for Preventing Collisions at Sea are a cornerstone of safe watchkeeping. Safety requires that one live these rules and follows the principles of safe watchkeeping. Maximizing bridge teamwork, including the practice of Bridge Resource Management, is an emerging focus in watchkeeping.

The main purpose for Radar and Automatic Radar Plotting Aids (ARPA) on a ship's bridge is to move safely among other vessels. These instruments help to accurately judge information about prominent objects in the vicinity, such as:

- range, bearing, course and speed
- time and distance of closest point of approach
- course and speed changes

These factors help the officer apply the COLREGS to safely maneuver in the vicinity of obstructions and other ships.

Unfortunately, radar has a number of limitations, and ARPA inherits those limitations and adds a number of its own. Factors such as rain, high seas, and dense clouds can prevent radar from detecting other vessels. Further, dense traffic and course and speed changes can confuse ARPA units. Finally, human errors such as inaccurate speed inputs and confusion between true and relative vectors add to the limitations of the radar/ARPA suite.

Under the best conditions, the radar operator must be able to optimize system settings and detect divergences between an ARPA system and actual conditions. Information obtained from radar and ARPA must be treated with scrutiny: over reliance on these systems has sunk ships. The officer must understand system performance, limitations and accuracy, tracking capabilities and limitations, and processing delays, and the use of operational warnings and system tests.

=== Emergencies ===
Emergencies can happen at any time. The officer must be equipped to safeguard passengers and crew. The officer must be able to take initial action after a collision or a grounding. Responsibilities include performing damage assessment and control, understanding the procedures for rescuing persons from the sea, assisting ships in distress, and responding to any emergency which may arise in port.

The Chief Mate is in charge of the firefighting and damage control teams. He is scene leader and reports via radio to the Captain who is in command and coordinates the larger response from the bridge.

The officer must understand distress signals and know the IMO Merchant Ship Search and Rescue Manual.

== Controlling ship operations ==
Understanding ship's stability, trim, stress, and the basics of ship's construction is a key to keeping a ship seaworthy. The mate must know what to do in cases of flooding and loss of buoyancy. Fire is also a constant concern. Knowing the classes and chemistry of fire, fire-fighting appliances, and systems prepares the officer to act fast in case of fire.

Officers are expected of competency in the use of survival craft and rescue boats, including the vessels' launching appliances and arrangements, their equipment including radio life-saving appliances, satellite EPIRBs, SARTs, immersion suits and thermal protective aids. These expectations are for survival at sea techniques in case of an emergency where the ship must be evacuated.

Officers are trained to perform medical tasks, and follow instructions given by radio or obtained from guides. This training includes what to do in case of common shipboard accidents and illnesses.

== Licensing ==
=== United Kingdom ===
It is usual for a chief/first officer to hold a master's certificate so that he can take over from the master if necessary. In the same way, a second officer usually holds a chief officer's certificate. Since the first half of the 20th century, the usual terminology in the British Merchant Navy has been "chief officer" rather than "chief mate". The chief officer may be colloquially referred to as the "first mate", but the term "chief mate" is rarely used.

=== United States ===
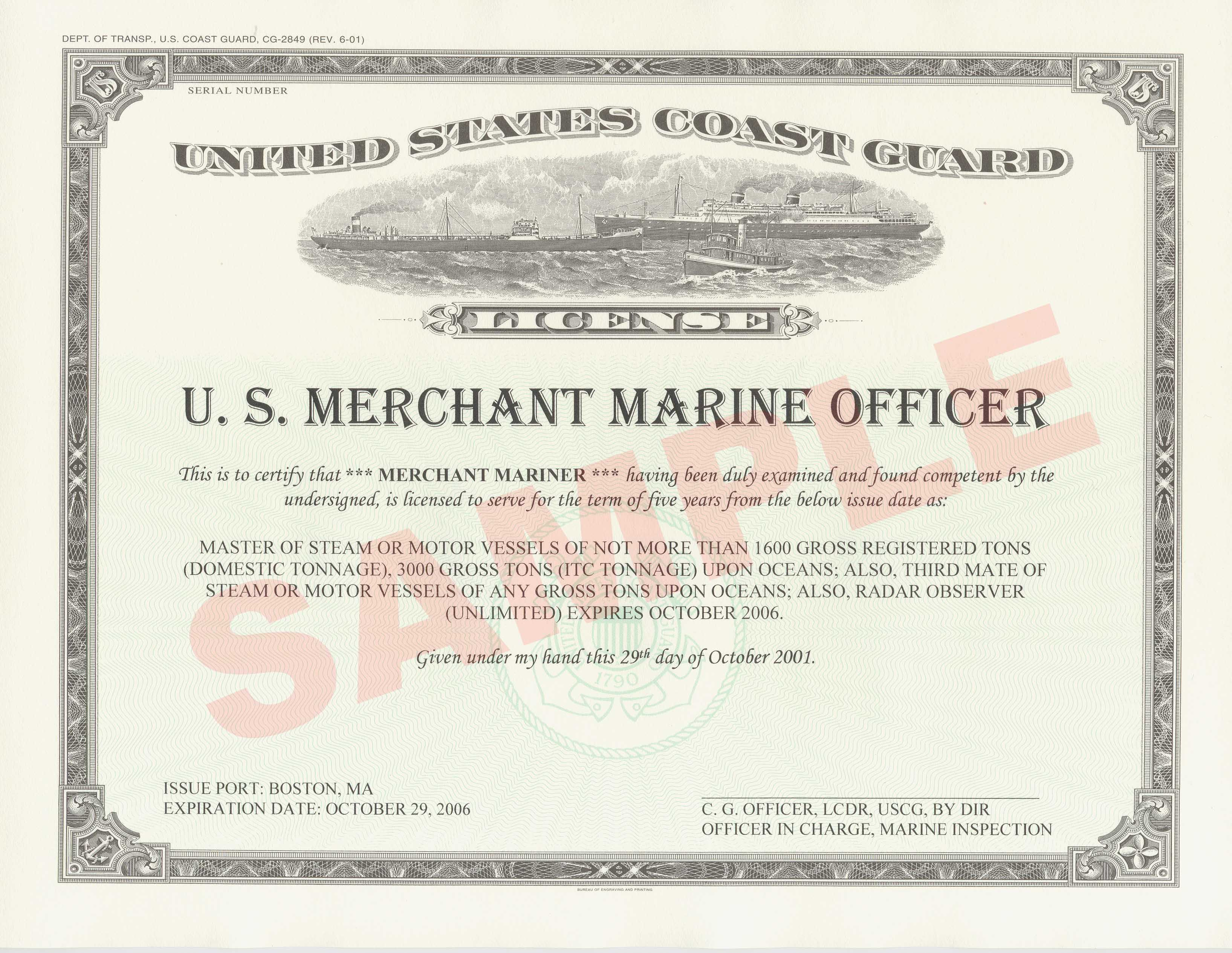
A chief mate must have a number of qualifications, including a license.

To become a chief mate (unlimited) in the United States, one must first accumulate at least 365 days of service while holding a second mate's license. Then, the candidate must attend approximately 13 weeks of classes or complete the assessments from NMC Policy Letter 04-02 and pass a series of examinations given by the United States Coast Guard. Similarly, one must have worked as a third mate for 365 days to have become a second mate. There are many special cases in license upgrades at the individual level, as licensing regulations change from time to time. A sizable portion of mates still working received their licenses before current laws went into effect.

There are two methods to attain an unlimited third mate's license in the United States: to attend a specialized training institution, or to accumulate "sea time" and take a series of training classes and examinations.

Training institutions that can lead to a third mate's license include the U.S. Merchant Marine Academy (deck curriculum), the U.S. Coast Guard Academy and U.S. Naval Academy with qualification as an underway officer in charge of a navigational watch, any of the state maritime colleges, the Great Lakes Maritime Academy, or a three-year apprentice mate training program approved by the Commandant of the U.S. Coast Guard.

A seaman may start the process of attaining a license after three years of service in the deck department on ocean steam or motor vessels, at least six months of which as able seaman, boatswain, or quartermaster. Then the seaman takes required training courses, and completes on-board assessments. Finally, the mariner can apply to the United States Coast Guard for a Third Mate's license.

A master of 1,600 ton vessels can, under certain circumstances, begin the application process for an unlimited third mate's license.

If approved the applicant must then successfully pass a comprehensive license examination before being issued the license. Hawsepiper is an informal maritime industry term used to refer to an officer who began their career as an unlicensed merchant seaman and did not attend a traditional maritime college/academy to earn the officer license.

Several merchant seamen's unions offer their membership the required training for career advancement. Similarly, some employers offer financial assistance to pay for the training for their employees. Otherwise, the mariner is responsible for the cost of the required training.

Since the requirements of STCW '95 have been enacted, there have been complaints that the hawsepiper progression path has been made too difficult because of the cost in time and money to meet formal classroom training requirements. These critics assert that the newer requirements will eventually lead to a shortage of qualified mariners, especially in places like the United States.

== Notable first mates and chief mates ==
- Fletcher Christian, acting sailing master of HMS Bounty
- Owen Chase, first mate of the whaleship Essex
- Henry Wilde, chief officer of Titanic
- George Lowther, first mate of SV Gambia Castle
- William Murdoch, first officer of Titanic
- John Biscoe, English mariner and explorer, who often sailed as first mate
- John Paul Jones, who was a first mate at the age of nineteen

=== Fictional characters ===
- Starbuck, first mate of the Pequod in the book Moby-Dick.
- In the Pirates of the Caribbean film franchise:
  - Hector Barbossa was the first mate of the ship Black Pearl before taking command by mutiny.
  - Joshamee Gibbs, first mate of Black Pearl.
  - Angelica, first mate of Queen Anne's Revenge in the film Pirates of the Caribbean: On Stranger Tides.
- Billy Bones, first mate of Captain Flint, and Mr Arrow, first mate of Hispaniola under Captain Alexander Smollett in Robert Louis Stevenson's novel Treasure Island.
- Zoë Washburne, first mate of the Serenity in the TV show Firefly.
- (Willy) Gilligan, first mate of the S.S. Minnow in the TV series Gilligan's Island.
- Allan Thompson, first mate of the Karaboudjan, serving under Captain Haddock, in the comic series The Adventures of Tintin.

== See also ==
- Angle of loll
- Merchant Navy
- Captain (nautical)
- Containerization
- First officer (aviation)
- Intermodal freight transport
- Navigation
- Seafarer's professions and ranks
- Second mate
- Ship transport
- Stevedore
- Strength of ships
- Third Mate
- United States Merchant Marine
