= Charles Pearson (priest) =

Charles William Pearson (1847–1917) was a pioneer Anglican missionary in Uganda, and thus was one of the pioneers of the Church of Uganda. In his journey to Uganda, he was also a significant early traveler in the Sudan. He was later a parish priest in England.

== Biography ==
=== Early life ===
He was born in Whitehaven, Cumberland, England, on 1847-12-07, son of William Pearson, a butcher, and his wife Sarah Johnson, and attended St. Bees Grammar School. Pearson had three brothers and two sisters. His younger brother Henry also became an Anglican priest.

=== Seafarer ===
He was a merchant seaman for some years, and served as an ordinary seaman on the Tenasserim, registered at Liverpool, for four voyages between 18 Oct 1867 and 29 Oct 1870. In 1872 he served as Third Mate on the Paraguay, and served as Second Mate on several vessels between 1872 and 1874. He qualified as First Mate in 1875, but joined the Brittania in London as second mate for a voyage to Lisbon 28 April 1875. She was wrecked on Holy Island on 19 Oct 1875. He was discharged in London on 19 Oct 1875.

=== Missionary ===
In 1876 he attended the Church Missionary Society College, Islington, and in 1878 led a party of four missionaries to Uganda to replace four who had died. The first party of CMS missionaries, led by Lt. G. Shergold-Smith, had landed at Bagamoyo in July 1876, but a year later two had been killed in a skirmish, and two others had died of fever.

Pearson and his companions, Robert William Felkin, John William Hall and the Rev. George Litchfield, travelled by ship to Suakim on the Red Sea. At Suakim, Hall was taken ill and had to return to England. From there, after crossing the desert, the remaining members of the party travelled up the Nile. They met Colonel Gordon in Khartoum, who tried to persuade Pearson to serve in Sudan instead. Pearson and his party reached Rubaga in Uganda on 14 February 1879, over nine months after setting out.

They were received at the court of Mutesa I, the Kabaka (King) of Buganda. A week later a party of French Roman Catholic missionaries arrived, and difficulties ensued as Mutesa played off Arab, British and French interests against each other. The Christian missionaries had, perhaps rather naively, not come prepared to be used as political pawns. Their denominational rivalry reduced the effectiveness of their message, as the Catholics refused to kneel for the Anglican prayers and vice versa.

Pearson appears to have been mainly occupied in translation work. After serving in Uganda for two years Pearson returned to England for health reasons, using the more conventional route via the East Coast and Zanzibar.

=== Ordination ===
He then studied theology at Oxford, and was ordained deacon in 1886 and priest in 1887. He was assistant curate at St Ebbe's in Oxford for four years, and then worked for the Church Pastoral Aid Society (CPAS) in Nottingham for another three years.

In July 1893 he became Vicar of Walton, Aylesbury, where he remained until his death on 1917-06-20. He was known as a student of languages, and gained knowledge of 17 languages. He was eminent as a translator, and served several publishers and missionary organisations in that capacity.

=== Marriage and children ===
He married Elizabeth Birkett in Oxford in 1882, and they had three sons and four daughters.
