= Central Institute of Fisheries Nautical and Engineering Training =

Indian marine studies centre

- केंद्रीय मत्स्य नौचालन एवं इंजीनियरी प्रशिक्षण संस्थान
- Former name: Central Institute of Fisheries Operatives
- Motto: Develop skilled man power for deep sea fishing
- Type: Central Government Public
- Established: 1963; 63 years ago
- Affiliations: UGC
- Academic affiliations: CUSAT
- Director: A. K. Choudhury
- Location: Fine Arts Avenue, Kochi, Kerala, 682016, India; 9.9650°N 76.2824°E
- Campus: 4.35 Acres; URBAN
- Language: English
- Website: cifnet.gov.in

- Location in Kerala Central Institute of Fisheries Nautical and Engineering Training (India)

The Central Institute of Fisheries Nautical and Engineering Training (or CIFNET) formerly known as the Central Institute of Fisheries Operatives, is a marine studies centre located at Kochi, India. Maintained by the Department of Fisheries and Animal Husbandry and Dairying of the Government of India, the institute was set up to aid research and development in the field.

The institute was set up for the statutory manning requirements of deep sea fishing vessels as per the Merchant Shipping Act.

The institute provides training in fisheries and maritime sector. The institute was set up in 1963 and is affiliated to the Cochin University of Science and Technology.

The institute has two other units in Visakhapatnam and Chennai.

The institute arranges training programmes for foreign nationals from countries like Nigeria, Oman, Maldives, Bangladesh, Sri Lanka, Philippines, Zambia, Ghana, Tanzania, Sudan, Yemen, Laos etc. under schemes like FAO fellowship, CFTC, SCAAP, Colombo plan, and ITEC.

The institute has three training vessels, mainly used for imparting onboard practical training for institutional trainees and for providing qualifying sea service for post-institutional trainees of the institute. The vessel M.V. Prashikshan i is attached to the headquarters at Kochi, the other two vessels M.V. Skipper II and M.V Tharangini are based at Chennai unit and Visakhapatnam unit.

== Courses ==
The institute offers a Bachelor of Fisheries and Nautical Science degree and two diploma courses. The diploma courses are in vessel navigation and marine fitting. It also conducts refresher courses for fishing grade exams aspirants.

=== Bachelor of Fishery science in Nautical science [ B.F.Sc (NS) ] ===
Bachelor of Fishery science in Nautical science is a Professional degree .It was started in 2005. The intake of students is through the Common Admission Test held in June every year. It also provides on board training for students in its own training vessel. After completion the degree will be awarded by Cochin University of Science and Technology. The course is approved by the University Grants Commission and the Directorate General of Shipping.

==== Career prospect ====
===== Deck cadet =====
Bachelor of Fishery science in Nautical science [ B.F.Sc (NS) ] is approved by the Directorate General of Shipping under the Graduates Entry Scheme as Nautical Deck Cadets (M.S. Notice 21 of 2008).

The candidates who have graduated Bachelor of Fishery science in Nautical science with 50% marks in aggregate and the Basic safety Training (BST) and security training for seafarers with designated security duties (stsdsd) with 15 months of sea experience are eligible to appear for examination. Bachelor of Fishery science in Nautical science graduates are exempted from pre-sea training.

Structured Shipboard Training Program of not less than 15 months which meets the requirements of section A-II/1 of the STCW Code and is documented in an approved training record book, including Bridge watch keeping duties under the supervision of the master or a qualified officer for a period of not less than 6 months.

On completion of sea service candidates are required to undertake preparatory course Second mate function of 4 months duration before appearing for their written examination. Candidates have to complete required advanced courses.

Candidates will be awarded Certificate of Competency as Second Mate of a foreign going ship (Officer In-charge of a Navigational Watch) on board ships of 500 GT

During the 4-year Degree program, on-board practical training and Simulator training is given to the students. The onboard practical training will be an opportunity to students to get acquainted with the operation, management and maintenance of the vessel.

===== Mate of a Fishing Vessel =====
Bachelor of Fishery science in Nautical science is an approved pre sea courses for entry into career for appearing fishing grade Certificate of Competency (COC) examinations in the nautical stream. 6 Months of sea experience on Seagoing Fishing Vessels of 15 M or above as deckhand is required as the eligibility for coc. B F Sc (NS) are exempted from the examinations and can directly attend the oral exams.

- Candidates can also choose their career opening in Central Fishery Institutions dealing with Research, Fishing Vessel operation, State Fishery Departments, Universities and Other Private Establishments dealing with Vessel operation, Fish Processing etc.

=== Vessel Navigator Course (VNC) and Marine Fitter Course (MFC) ===
The institute has conducted two trade courses viz. Vessel Navigator & Marine Fitter Course of 2 years duration, which is formulated under Craftman Training scheme of NCVT, New Delhi since 2006. The successful candidates, after obtaining sea service will become competent to appear for the competency examinations conducted by the Mercantile Marine Department, Director General of Shipping, Ministry of Shipping, government of India.

The institute conducts an ancillary course viz. Shore Mechanic Course (12 months) on request from State Fisheries Departments for personnel who manage the shore establishments of the fisheries organisations.

=== Short-term training programmes ===
The institute's facilities in the field of Nautical, Fisheries and Engineering Technology are used for short term courses for the specific requirement of the participants as follows:

- Short term training for fishermen
- Tailor made programmes conducted for sister organisations
- Refresher courses for serving officials of fishery organisations
- Orientation courses for new entrants of fishery and financial institutions
- Refresher courses for college faculties
- Short term courses for graduate, postgraduate students of fishery colleges, B.Tech. and M.Tech. students of engineering colleges.
- Capacity Building in Deep Sea fishing & Onboard Handling of Tuna to Fishermen.

The expertise of CIFNET is used to conduct short term training programmes for the student's fraternity during last few years. The ITI / ITC, graduates, postgraduate students and students of the Engineering Colleges attend these sandwich programmes.

=== Statutory courses ===
A number of statutory modular courses such as Elementary Fishing Technology Course, Advanced Fishing Technology Course and Radar Observers Course, are mandatory for obtaining the competency certificates issued by MMD, D.G. Shipping. CIFNET is the sole agency in India approved by the DG Shipping for the conduct of Elementary Fishing Technology and Advanced Fishing Technology courses.

=== Refresher Courses for Examination ===
Preparatory coaching classes are essential for the candidates appearing for Competency examinations to update their knowledge. CIFNET organises refresher training courses for Mate Fishing Vessel Examination, Engine Driver Fishing Vessel Examination, Skipper Gr. II Examination, Engineer Fishing Vessel Examination to enable the candidates to face the examination with confidence.

== Infrastructure ==
Institute infrastructure facilities at its three centres are class rooms, laboratories, workshop, Nautical-Chart practice hall, Simulator (ERS&N) centre, Craft & Gear practical, library, hostel, recreation and other amenities. CIFNET has headquarters at Kochi and units at Chennai & Visakhapatnam.

=== Kochi headquarters ===
The institute has had its headquarters in Kochi since 1963. The headquarters is in a permanent training complex of 5,730 m^{2} (61,700 sq ft) in a site of 4.35 acres (1.76 ha).

A marine engineering workshop, repair shop and chart hall are available. The regular courses are residential. Hostel facilities are available for the convenience of the trainees.

=== Chennai Unit ===
The Chennai Unit of the institute was established during 1968 and functions from an office complex of 2903 sq.m. in 1.4 acres of land at Royapuram, Chennai. The unit has hostel facilities for the trainees.

=== Visakhapatnam Unit ===
The Vizag unit is in a complex of 3300 m^{2} built in a plot of 1 acre in front of the fishing harbor since 1981, with hostel amenities.

== Technical Divisions ==
=== Nautical Division ===
The department is responsible for imparting training, both theoretical and practical in Seamanship and Navigation for the Institutional cadets of B.Fsc. (Nautical Science), MFC and VNC including the candidates who were preparing for the competency examination for Skipper/Mates. The Department of Nautical Science has facilities at all three centers of CIFNET for imparting theoretical as well as practical training in Seamanship, Navigation, Marine Meteorology and Oceanography. It has visual aids for onshore training. The department is also equipped with navigational equipment and has a navigation hall for conducting chart practicals and passage planning.

=== Marine Engineering Division ===
This division covers disciplines of engineering such as Marine Engines, Marine Auxiliaries, Electrical, Electronics, Computer Application, Fishing Craft Technology, Refrigeration and Hydraulics. Workshop and laboratories on the above disciplines are available with the institute to impart practical training to the students.

==== Marine Engineering Workshop ====
A workshop is available for maintenance and repairs of the training vessels of the institute. It provides practical training with emphasis on machining, welding, smithy, fitting, carpentry and IC engine refitting.

=== Training Division ===
Training section of the institute coordinates all the training activities of the institute. Selection of candidates by conducting entrance examinations, interviews, curriculum development, planning, programming and conducting various training courses are dealt by the section. It also provides employment guidance for the post-institutional trainees.

=== Library ===
The institute library is equipped with technical-scientific books and journals on nautical science, marine engineering, navigation technology, naval architecture, ship operation technology, workshop technology, electrical technology, electronics, computer science, fishery biology, fishing gear technology, fishing craft technology, fish handling, marine meteorology, oceanography, refrigeration, and hydraulics.

=== Department of Fisheries Technology ===
The department has infrastructure for fishing gear repairs, fabrication and training. The department imparts theoretical and practical classes on fishing gear materials and design, fishing technique, fishery biology, deck equipment etc. Fabrication, repairs and maintenance of fishing gear for the training vessels is undertaken by the department. The department is equipped with a fishing gear and fishery biology laboratory.

== Training For foreign nationals ==
The institute arranges training programmes for foreign nationals from countries like Nigeria, Zambia, Tanzania, Ghana, Yemen, Myanmar, Laos, Sri Lanka, Bangladesh, Maldives, Philippines, and Oman under the schemes of FAO Fellowship, CFTC, SCAAP, ESCAP, ITEC, and Colombo Plan.
