= Passage planning =

Maritime procedure

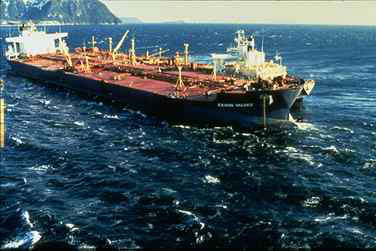
Poor passage planning and unchecked deviation from the plan can lead to groundings, collisions and oil spills.

Passage planning or voyage planning is a procedure to develop a complete description of a vessel's voyage to safely navigate from start to finish. The plan includes leaving the dock and harbor area, the en route portion of a voyage, approaching the destination, and mooring, the industry term for this is 'berth to berth'. According to international law, a vessel's captain is legally responsible for passage planning. The duty of passage planning is usually delegated to the ship's navigation officer, typically the second officer on merchant ships.

Passage plans are important for the safety of a vessel as it requires the correct assessment and establishment of safety settings. They ensure that vital navigation information is readily available, expectations for crew and those ashore are known, and minimize the likelihood of accidents. The modern procedure for passage plans was developed by the International Maritime Organization and involves a four-stage process.

Studies show that human error is a factor in 80 percent of navigational accidents and that in many cases the human making the error had access to information that could have prevented the accident. The practice of voyage planning has evolved from penciling lines on nautical charts to a process of risk management.

== Planning stages ==
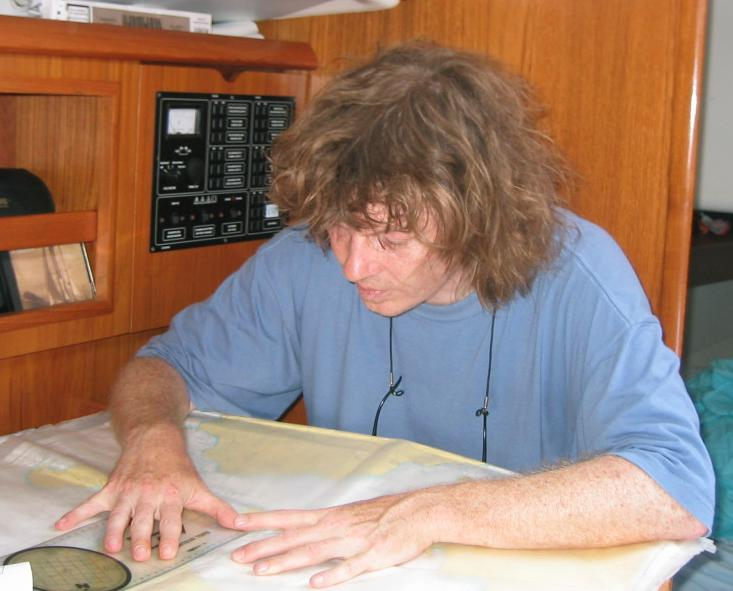
Monitoring progress and comparing it to the plan are key to passage planning.

Passage planning consists of four key stages: appraisal, planning, execution, and monitoring. These stages are specified in International Maritime Organization Resolution A.893(21), Guidelines For Voyage Planning, which are, in turn, reflected in the local laws of IMO signatory countries. The Guidelines specify fifty elements of passage planning, some of which are only applicable in certain situations. A fifth stage, analysis is also recommended, which involves a debriefing after the passage plan to review its effectiveness for future voyage planning.

The Guidelines specify three key items to consider in the practice of voyage planning:

- having and using a voyage plan is "of essential importance for safety of life at sea, safety and efficiency of navigation and protection of the marine environment,"
- voyage planning is necessary for all types of vessels on all types of voyages, and
- the plan's scope should be based on all information available, should be "berth to berth," including when under pilotage, and the plan includes the execution and the monitoring of progress.

Voyage planning starts with the appraisal stage. Before each voyage begins, navigators develop a detailed mental model of how the entire voyage will proceed. The appraisal stage consists of gathering and contemplating all information relevant to the voyage. Much of this appraisal is done by consulting nautical charts, nautical publications and performing a number of technical tasks such as weather forecasting, prediction of tides and currents, and checks of local regulations and warnings.

Nautical publications are a valuable guide to local conditions and regulations, but they must be updated and actually read to be of any use. These publications could include Sailing Directions and Coast Pilots or similar texts produced by other authorities.

Once information is gathered and considered, the navigator can begin the process of planning the voyage. The process involves projecting various future events including landfalls, narrow passages, and course changes expected during the voyage. This mental model becomes the standard by which the navigator measures progress toward the goal of a safe and efficient voyage, and it is manifested in a passage plan.

A good passage plan will include a track line laid out upon the best-scale charts available. This track is judged with respect to at least nine separate criteria given in the Guidelines including under-keel clearance, safe speed, air draft, the use of routing and reporting services (TSS and VTS), and the availability of contingencies in case of emergency.

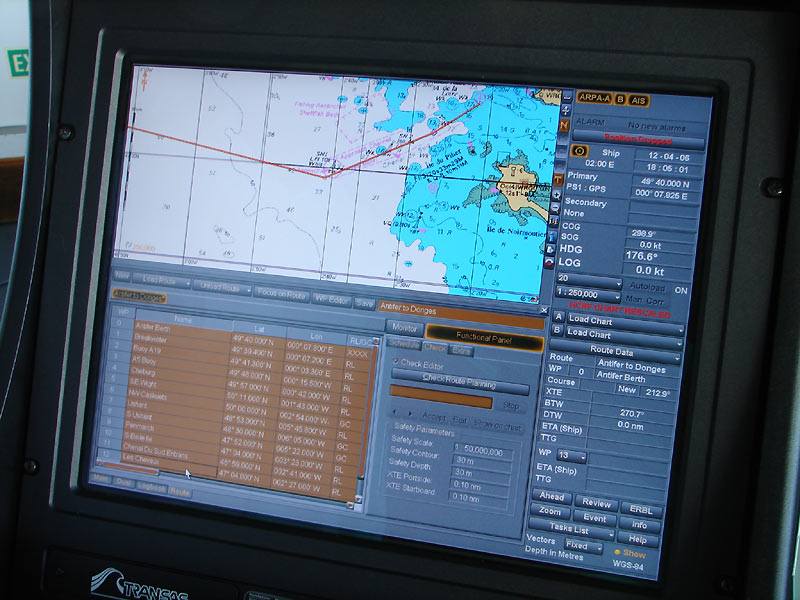
Modern navigators often enter passage plans on electronic systems

The navigator will draw and redraw the track line until it is safe, efficient, and in line with all applicable laws and regulations. When the track is finished, it is becoming common practice to also enter it into electronic navigation tools such as an Electronic Chart Display and Information System, a chartplotter, an ARPA system, or a GPS unit. When passage planning on ECDIS, it is important to calculate the safety settings for the ECDIS. The navigator should calculate both under keel clearance and overhead vertical clearance (if passing under obstructions). The calculation should include an allow for the height of tide (if applicable), the vessel's draught, squat and a safety allowance. This provides the navigator with a minimum UKC value that can then be compared with charted depths on electronic or paper charts to ensure the vessel's courses in the passage plan have sufficient depth to navigate safely.

When working in a team environment, the passage plan should be communicated to the navigation team in a pre-voyage conference in order to ensure that all members of the team share the same mental model of the entire trip.

The third stage of passage planning is the execution stage. The IMO was careful to include execution as part of the process of passage planning. This underscores the fact that the Guidelines list a number of tasks that are to executed during the course of the voyage. It also reiterates the captain's responsibility to treat the plan as a "living document" and to review or change it in case of any special circumstances that should arise.

The fourth and final stage of voyage planning is the monitoring stage. Once the voyage has begun the progress of the vessel along its planned route must be monitored. This requires that the ship's position be determined, using standard methods including dead reckoning, celestial navigation, pilotage, and electronic navigation.

According to the Guidelines, the passage plan should always be available to the officer on watch on the bridge. The Guidelines also specify that deviations from the plan should be clearly recorded and be consistent with other provisions of the Guidelines.

== Computer aids ==
In modern times, computer software can greatly simplify the passage planning process and ensure that nothing important is overlooked. Passage planning software may include functions such as waypoint management, distance calculators, tide and tidal current predictors, celestial navigational calculators, consumables estimators for fuel, oil, water, and stores, and other useful applications.
