= Crew resource management =

Air crew communication and decision-making training

Crew resource management or cockpit resource management (CRM) is a set of training procedures for use in environments where human error can have devastating effects. CRM is primarily used for improving aviation safety, and focuses on interpersonal communication, leadership, and decision making in aircraft cockpits. Its founder is David Beaty, a former Royal Air Force and a BOAC pilot who wrote The Human Factor in Aircraft Accidents (1969). Despite the considerable development of electronic aids since then, many principles he developed continue to prove effective.

CRM in the US formally began with a National Transportation Safety Board (NTSB) recommendation written by NTSB Air Safety Investigator and aviation psychologist Alan Diehl during his investigation of the 1978 United Airlines Flight 173 crash. The issues surrounding that crash included a DC-8 crew running out of fuel over Portland, Oregon, while troubleshooting a landing gear problem.

Following this accident, NASA held a workshop which developed ideas on how CRM might be trained. It was attended by 70 people from 32 organizations representing 9 countries, with the resulting proceedings described in a following workshop as "the bible" of CRM. In the US, United Airlines was the first airline to launch a comprehensive CRM program, starting in 1981. By the 1990s, CRM had become a global standard.

The term "cockpit resource management" was later amended to "crew resource management" to include all the aircraft crew, rather than just the pilots and engineers as first conceived. The term was coined in 1979 by NASA psychologist John Lauber, who for several years had studied communication processes in cockpits. While retaining a command hierarchy, the concept was intended to foster a less-authoritarian cockpit culture in which co-pilots are encouraged to question captains if they observed them making mistakes.

United Airlines trained their flight attendants to use CRM in conjunction with the pilots to provide another layer of enhanced communication and teamwork. Studies have shown the use of CRM by both work groups reduces communication barriers and problems can be solved more effectively, leading to increased safety. CRM training concepts have been modified for use in a wide range of activities including air traffic control, ship handling, firefighting, and surgery, in which people must make dangerous, time-critical decisions.

== Overview ==
CRM is the "effective use of all available resources by individuals and crews to safely and effectively accomplish a mission or task, as well as identifying and managing the conditions that lead to error."

CRM training encompasses a wide range of knowledge, skills, and attitudes including communications, situational awareness, problem solving, decision making, and teamwork. Although there is no universal CRM program, airlines usually customize their training to best suit the needs of the organization. The principles of each program are usually closely aligned.

According to the U.S. Navy, there are seven critical CRM skills:

- Decision making – the use of logic and judgement to make decisions based on available information
- Assertiveness – willingness to participate and state a given position until convinced by facts that another option is more correct
- Mission analysis – ability to develop short and long term contingency plans
- Communication – clear and accurate sending and receiving of information, instructions, commands and useful feedback
- Leadership – ability to direct and coordinate activities of pilots & crew members
- Adaptability/flexibility – ability to alter course of action due to changing situations or availability of new information
- Situational awareness – ability to perceive the environment within time and space, and comprehend its meaning

These seven skills comprise the critical foundation for effective aircrew coordination. With the development and use of these core skills, flight crews "highlight the importance of identifying human factors and team dynamics to reduce human errors that lead to aviation mishaps."

=== Adoption of CRM ===
Since the implementation of CRM circa 1979, following the need for increased research on resource management by NASA, the aviation industry has seen tremendous evolution of the application of CRM training procedures. The application of CRM has been developed in a series of generations:

- First generation: emphasized individual psychology and testing, where corrections could be made to behavior.
- Second generation: featured a shift in focus to cockpit group dynamics.
- Third evolution: diversification of scope and an emphasis on training crews in how they must function both in and out of the cockpit.
- Fourth generation: CRM integrated procedure into training, allowing organizations to tailor training to their needs.
- Fifth generation (current): acknowledges that human error is inevitable and provides information to improve safety standards.

Today, CRM is implemented through pilot and crew training sessions, simulations, and through interactions with senior ranked personnel and flight instructors such as briefing and debriefing flights. Although it is difficult to measure the success of CRM programs, studies have been conclusive that there is a correlation between CRM programs and better risk management.

The current generic term "crew resource management" (CRM) has been widely adopted but is also known as cockpit resource management; flightdeck resource management; and command, leadership and resource management. When CRM techniques are applied to other arenas, they are sometimes given unique labels, such as maintenance resource management, bridge and engine room resource management (BRM, ERM), or maritime resource management.

=== Emphasis on non-technical skills ===
CRM is concerned with the cognitive and interpersonal skills needed to manage resources within an organized system rather than with the technical knowledge and skills required to operate equipment. In this context, cognitive skills are defined as the mental processes used for gaining and maintaining situational awareness, for solving problems and for making decisions. Interpersonal skills are regarded as communications and a range of behavioral activities associated with teamwork. In many operational systems, skill areas often overlap and are not confined to multi-crew craft or equipment, and relate to single operator equipment or craft.

Aviation organizations including major airlines and military aviation have introduced CRM training for crews. CRM training is now a mandated requirement for commercial pilots working under most regulatory bodies, including the FAA (US) and EASA (Europe). The NOTECHS system is used to evaluate non-technical skills. Following the lead of the commercial airline industry, the US Department of Defense began training its air crews in CRM in the mid 1980s. The U.S. Air Force and U.S. Navy require all air crew members to receive annual CRM training to reduce human-error-caused mishaps. The U.S. Army has its own version of CRM called Aircrew Coordination Training Enhanced (ACT-E).

== Case studies ==
=== United Airlines Flight 173 ===
When the crew of United Airlines Flight 173 was making an approach to Portland International Airport on the evening of Dec 28, 1978, they experienced a landing gear abnormality. The captain decided to enter a holding pattern so they could troubleshoot the problem. The captain focused on the landing gear problem for an hour, ignoring repeated hints from the first officer and the flight engineer about their dwindling fuel supply, and only realized the situation when the engines began flaming out. The aircraft crash-landed in a suburb of Portland, Oregon, over six miles (10 km) short of the runway. Of the 189 people aboard, two crew members and eight passengers died. The NTSB Safety Recommendation A-79-47 called on the FAA to:

Issue an operations bulletin to all air carrier operations inspectors directing them to urge their assigned operators to ensure that their flight crews are indoctrinated in principles of flight deck resource management, with particular emphasis on the merits of participative management for Captains and assertiveness training for other cockpit crewmembers. (Class II, Priority Action) (A-79-47)

Diehl was assigned to investigate this accident and realized it was similar to several other major airline accidents including the crash of Eastern Air Lines Flight 401 and the runway collision between Pan Am and KLM Boeing 747s at Tenerife.

=== United Airlines Flight 232 ===
Captain Al Haynes, pilot of United Airlines Flight 232, credits CRM as being one of the factors that saved his own life, and many others, in the Sioux City, Iowa crash of July 1989:

... the preparation that paid off for the crew was something ... called Cockpit Resource Management ... Up until 1980, we kind of worked on the concept that the captain was THE authority on the aircraft. What he said, goes. And we lost a few airplanes because of that. Sometimes the captain isn't as smart as we thought he was. And we would listen to him, and do what he said, and we wouldn't know what he's talking about. And we had 103 years of flying experience there in the cockpit, trying to get that airplane on the ground, not one minute of which we had actually practiced [under those failure conditions], any one of us. So why would I know more about getting that airplane on the ground under those conditions than the other three. So if I hadn't used [CRM], if we had not let everybody put their input in, it's a cinch we wouldn't have made it.

=== Air France 447 ===
One analysis blames failure to follow proper CRM procedures as being a contributing factor that led to the 2009 fatal crash into the Atlantic Ocean of Air France Flight 447 from Rio de Janeiro to Paris. The final report concluded the aircraft crashed after temporary inconsistencies between the airspeed measurements—likely due to the aircraft's pitot tubes being obstructed by ice crystals—caused the autopilot to disconnect, after which the crew reacted incorrectly, causing the aircraft to enter an aerodynamic stall from which it did not recover.

Following recovery of the black box two years later, independent analyses were published before and after the official report was issued by the BEA, France's air safety board. One was a French report in the book "Erreurs de Pilotage" written by Jean-Pierre Otelli, which leaked the final minutes of recorded cockpit conversation. According to Popular Mechanics, which examined the cockpit conversation just before the crash:

The men are utterly failing to engage in an important process known as crew resource management, or CRM. They are failing, essentially, to cooperate. It is not clear to either one of them who is responsible for what, and who is doing what.

=== First Air Flight 6560 ===
The Canadian Transportation Safety Board (CTSB) determined a failure of crew resource management was largely responsible for the crash of First Air Flight 6560, a Boeing 737-200, in Resolute, Nunavut, on August 20, 2011. A malfunctioning compass gave the crew an incorrect heading, although the instrument landing system and Global Positioning System indicated they were off course. The first officer made several attempts to indicate the problem to the captain but a failure to follow airline procedures and a lack of a standardized communication protocol to indicate a problem led to the captain dismissing the first officer's warnings. Both pilots were also overburdened with making preparations to land, resulting in neither being able to pay full attention to what was happening.

First Air increased the time dedicated to CRM in their training as a result of the accident, and the CTSB recommended regulatory bodies and airlines to standardize CRM procedures and training in Canada.

=== Qantas Flight 32 ===
The success of the Qantas Flight 32 flight has been attributed to teamwork and CRM skills. Susan Parson, the editor of the Federal Aviation Administration (FAA) Safety Briefing wrote; "Clearly, the QF32 crew's performance was a bravura example of the professionalism and airmanship every aviation citizen should aspire to emulate".

Carey Edwards, author of Airmanship, wrote:

Their crew performance, communications, leadership, teamwork, workload management, situation awareness, problem solving and decision making resulted in no injuries to the 450 passengers and crew. QF32 will remain as one of the finest examples of airmanship in the history of aviation.

== Adoption in other fields ==
=== Transportation ===
The basic concepts and ideology of CRM have proven successful in other related fields. In the 1990s, several commercial aviation firms and international aviation safety agencies began expanding CRM into air traffic control, aircraft design, and aircraft maintenance. The aircraft maintenance section of this training expansion gained traction as maintenance resource management (MRM). To attempt to standardize industry-wide MRM training, the FAA issued Advisory Circular 120–72, "Maintenance Resource Management Training" in September 2000.

Following a study of aviation mishaps between 1992 and 2002, the United States Air Force determined that close to 18% of its aircraft mishaps were directly attributable to human error in maintenance, which often occurred long before the flight in which the problems were discovered. These "latent errors" include failures to follow published aircraft manuals, lack of assertive communication among maintenance technicians, poor supervision, and improper assembly practices. In 2005, to address these human-error-induced aircraft mishaps, Lt Col Doug Slocum, Chief of Safety at the Air National Guard's (ANG) 162nd Fighter Wing, Tucson, directed the modification of the base's CRM program into a military version called maintenance resource management (MRM).

In mid-2005, the Air National Guard's Aviation Safety Division converted Slocum's MRM program into a national program available to the Air National Guard's flying wings in 54 U.S. states and territories. In 2006, the Defense Safety Oversight Council (DSOC) of the U.S. Department of Defense (DoD) recognized the mishap-prevention value of this maintenance safety program by partially funding a variant of ANG MRM for training throughout the U.S. Air Force. This ANG initiated, DoD-funded version of MRM became known as Air Force Maintenance Resource Management (AF-MRM) and is now widely used in the U.S. Air Force.

The Rail Safety Regulators Panel of Australia has adapted CRM to rail as rail resource management and developed a free resource kit. Operating train crews at the National Railroad Passenger Corporation (Amtrak) in the United States are instructed on CRM principles during yearly training courses.

CRM has been adopted by merchant shipping worldwide. The STCW Convention and STCW Code, 2017 edition, published by the I.M.O. states the requirements for bridge resource management and engine room resource management training. These are approved shore-based training, simulator training, or approved in-service experience. Most maritime colleges hold courses for deck and engine room officers. Refresher courses are held every five years. These are referred to as maritime resource management.

=== Firefighting ===
Following its use in aviation training, CRM was identified as a potential safety improvement program for the fire services. Ted Putnam advocated for improved attention to human factors that contribute to accidents and near misses, building on CRM principles. In 1995, Dr. Putnam organized the first Human Factors Workshop for wildland fire. Dr. Putnam also wrote a paper that applied CRM concepts to the violent deaths of 14 Wildland firefighters on the South Canyon Fire in Colorado.

From this paper, a movement was initiated in the Wildland and Structural Fire Services to apply CRM concepts to emergency response situations. Various programs have since been developed to train emergency responders in these concepts and to help track breakdowns in these stressful environments.

The International Association of Fire Chiefs published its first CRM manual for the fire service in 2001. The manual was a joint effort between the U.S. Fire Administration, the Foundation for Firefighter Health and Safety and Volunteer Fireman’s Insurance Services, with some initial funding contributed by Dennis Smith. In 2024, the fourth edition of the manual was released. Some industry-specific textbooks have also been published to adapt the concept to firefighting situations.

=== Healthcare ===
Elements of CRM have been applied in US healthcare since the late 1990s, specifically in infection prevention. For example, the "central line bundle" of best practices recommends using a checklist when inserting a central venous catheter. The observer checking off the checklist is usually lower-ranking than the person inserting the catheter. The observer is encouraged to communicate when elements of the bundle are not executed; for example if a breach in sterility has occurred.

==== Team Strategies and Tools to Enhance Performance and Patient Safety (TeamSTEPPS) ====
The Agency for Healthcare Research and Quality (AHRQ), a division of the United States Department of Health and Human Services, also provides training based on CRM principles to healthcare teams. This training, called Team Strategies and Tools to Enhance Performance and Patient Safety (TeamSTEPPS), and the program is currently being implemented in hospitals, long-term care facilities, and primary care clinics around the world. TeamSTEPPs was designed to improve patient safety by teaching healthcare providers how to better collaborate with each other by using tools such as huddles, debriefs, handoffs, and check-backs. Implementing TeamSTEPPS has been shown to improve patient safety. There is evidence TeamSTEPPS interventions are difficult to implement and are not universally effective. There are strategies healthcare leaders can use to improve their chance of implementation success, such as using coaching, supporting, empowering, and supporting behaviors.

== See also ==
- British European Airways Flight 548
- The Checklist Manifesto – primarily a justification of the application of these ideas to safety in medical operating rooms
- Impact of culture on aviation safety
- Line-oriented flight training
- Maritime resource management
- Saudia Flight 163
- SHELL model
- Single pilot resource management
- Sterile cockpit rule
- Stress in the aviation industry
- Threat and error management
