= Line-oriented flight training =

Complete-crew flight training

Line-oriented flight training (or LOFT) is training in a simulator with a complete crew using representative flight segments that contain normal, abnormal, and emergency procedures that may be expected in line operations. An instructor will monitor the crew's performance and review the simulated flight or flights with the crew afterwards to point out errors or good decisions that were made.

== LOFT debriefing ==
LOFT instructors and crews use LOFT debriefings to analyze and evaluate their performance during training. For LOFT debriefings to improve crew performance, instructors must be effective facilitators.

== See also ==
- Type rating
- Crew resource management
