= Hawsepiper =

Informal maritime industry term

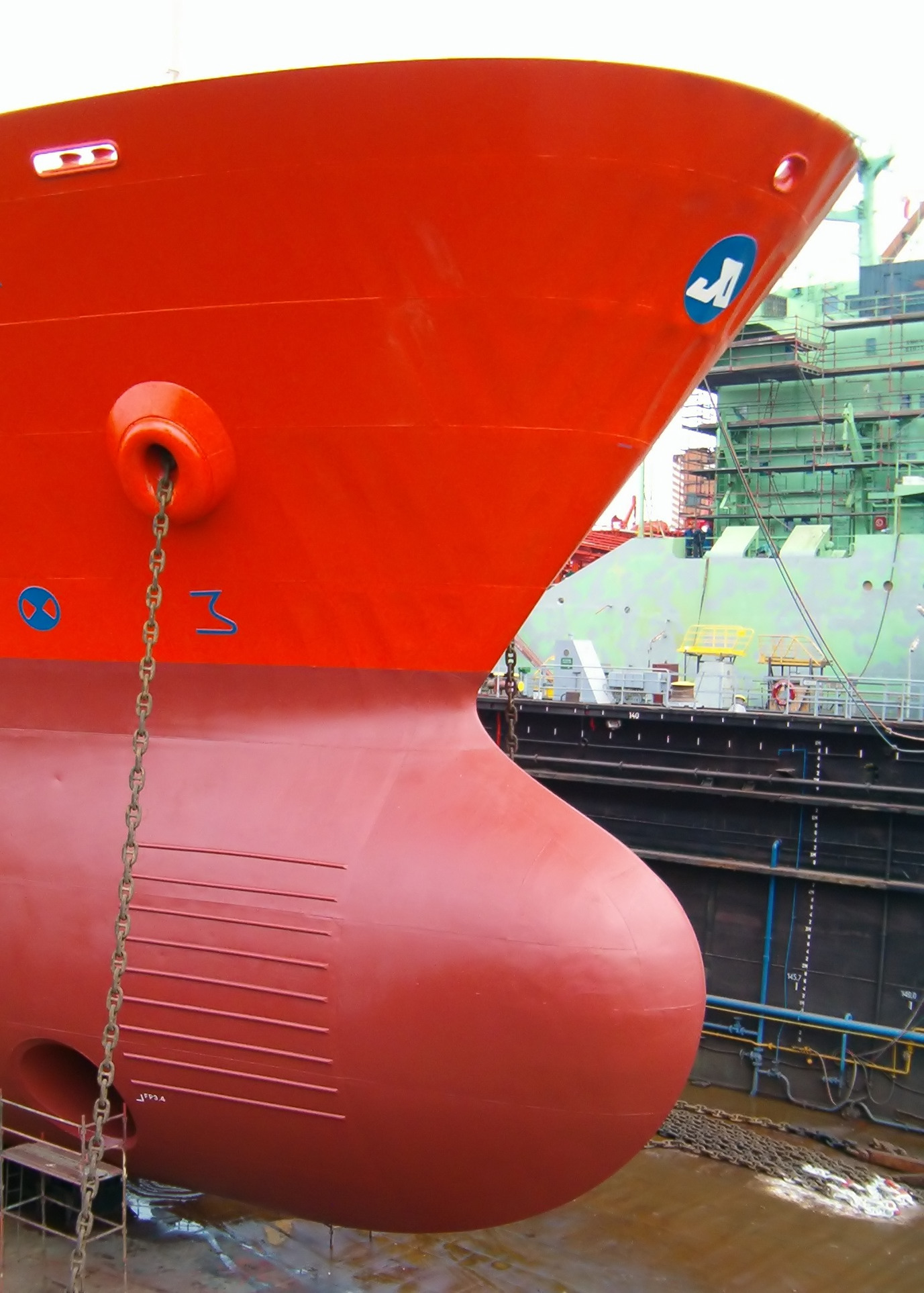
This photo shows the anchor chain running through a ship's hawsepipe

Hawsepiper is an informal maritime industry term used to refer to a merchant ship's officer who began his or her career as an unlicensed merchant seaman and did not attend a traditional maritime college or academy to earn an officer's license.

A ship's hawsepipe is the pipe passing through the bow section of a ship that the anchor chain passes through. Hawsepiper refers to climbing up the hawsepipe, a nautical metaphor for climbing up the ship's rank structure. This is in turn derived from the traditional British Naval usage of "came up through the hawsehole", referring to sailors who first entered the ship as foremast jacks before becoming officers, metaphorically by climbing up the hawser rather than being received directly onto the quarterdeck. There is also the phrase, "going down the hawse pipe" which refers to an officer who cannot find a ship's billet and signs on as an ordinary seaman or wiper. Several merchant seamen's unions offer their members the required training to help them advance, and some employers offer financial assistance to pay for the training for their employees. Otherwise, the mariner must pay the cost of the required training.

Since the requirements of STCW '95 were enacted there have been complaints that the hawsepiper progression path has been made too difficult because of the cost in time and money to meet formal classroom training requirements. Critics said that the newer requirements would eventually lead to a shortage of qualified mariners, especially in places like the United States.

== See also ==
- Licensed mariner
- Third mate
- Third Assistant Engineer
