= Nautical publications =

Publications used for navigation and operations onboard ships and boats

Nautical publications is a technical term used in maritime circles describing a set of publications, either published by national governments or by commercial and professional organisations, for use in safe navigation of ships, boats, and similar vessels. Other publications might cover topics such as seamanship and cargo operations. In the UK, the United Kingdom Hydrographic Office, the Witherby Publishing Group and the Nautical Institute provide numerous navigational publications, including charts, publications on how to navigate and passage planning publications. In the US, publications are issued by the US government and US Coast Guard.

The marine environment is subject to frequent change and the latest publications should always be used, especially when passage planning.

Hydrographic officers who produce of nautical publications also provide a system to inform mariners of changes that effect the chart. In the US and the UK, corrections and notifications of new editions are provided by various governmental agencies by way of Notice to Mariners, Local Notice to Mariners, Summary of Corrections, and Broadcast Notice to Mariners. Radio broadcasts give advance notice of urgent corrections.

A convenient way to keep track of corrections is with a Chart and Publication Correction Record system, either electronic or paper-based. Using this system, the navigator does not immediately update every publication in the library when a new Notice to Mariners arrives, instead creating a 'card' for every chart and noting the correction on this 'card'. When the time comes to use the publication, the navigator pulls the publication and its card, and makes the indicated corrections to the publication. This system ensures that every publication is properly corrected prior to use.

Various and diverse methods exist for the correction of electronic nautical publications.

== List of publications ==
=== List of Lights and Radio Signals ===
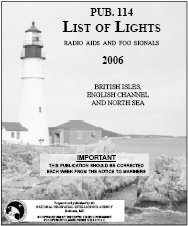
List of Lights issued by the US Coast Guard.

List of lights and radio signals, sometimes including Fog Signals are provided by government authorities and hydrographic offices for mariners. The lists include prominent lights, such as lighthouses and radio stations that are used in passage planning for navigation and communication while on voyage. In the US, the United States Coast Guard Light List is an American navigation publication in seven volumes made available yearly by the U.S. Coast Guard which gives information on lighted navigation aids, unlighted buoys, radiobeacons, radio direction finder calibration stations, daybeacons and racons. The List of Lights, Radio Aids, and Fog Signals is a navigation publication produced by the United States Defense Mapping Agency Hydrographic/Topographic Center. The book is usually referred to as the List of Lights, and should not be confused with the U.S. Coast Guard's Light List. The List of Lights is published in seven volumes, as Publication numbers 110 through 116. Each volume contains lights and other aids to navigation that are maintained by or under the authority of other governments.

In the UK, the UKHO List of Lights and Fog Signals, and the Admiralty List of Radio signals are split into separate volumes. The UKHO light lists include some 85,000 light structures of significance for navigation. The UKHO radio lists are split into six volumes.

The Canadian Coast Guard publishes its own List of Lights, Buoys and Fog Signals covering various coastal geographic areas in Canada.

=== Pilot Volumes/Sailing Directions ===
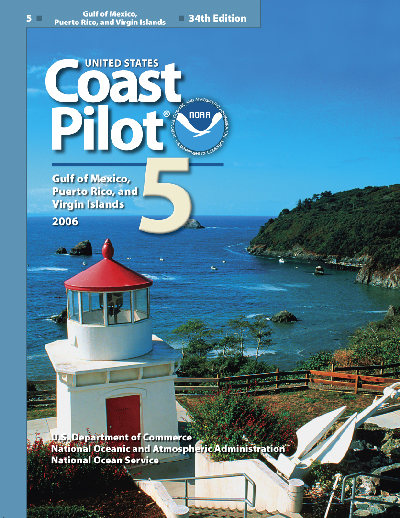
Coast Pilot 5 cover

These provide a variety of information for the mariner, including details of harbours, ports, navigational hazards, local information and pilotage requirements.

In the UK, the Admiralty issues 76 volumes covering the world and these are used frequently by most merchant ships.

In the US, the United States Coast Pilots is a nine-volume American navigation publication distributed yearly by the National Ocean Service. Its purpose is to supplement nautical charts of US waters. Information comes from field inspections, survey vessels, and various harbour authorities. Maritime officials and pilotage associations provide additional information. Coast Pilots provides more detailed information than Sailing Directions because the latter is intended exclusively for the oceangoing mariner. Each volume of Coast Pilots must be regularly corrected using Notice to Mariners.

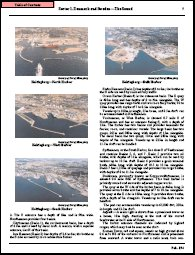
en:Sailing Directions is a U.S. nautical publication.

Sailing Directions is a 47-volume American navigation publication published by the Defense Mapping Agency Hydrographic/Topographic Center. It consists of 37 Enroute volumes and 10 Planning Guides. Planning Guides describe general features of ocean basins; Enroutes describe features of coastlines, ports, and harbors. Sailing Directions is updated when new data requires extensive revision of an existing text. These data are obtained from several sources, including pilots and Sailing Directions from other countries.

Passage Planning Guides provide a variety of navigation related information for deck officers during passage planning and cover certain geographic areas. Examples include the Witherby Passage Planning Guide for the Straits of Malacca and Singapore and the Port of London Authority Passage Planning Guide.

=== General Reference Publications ===
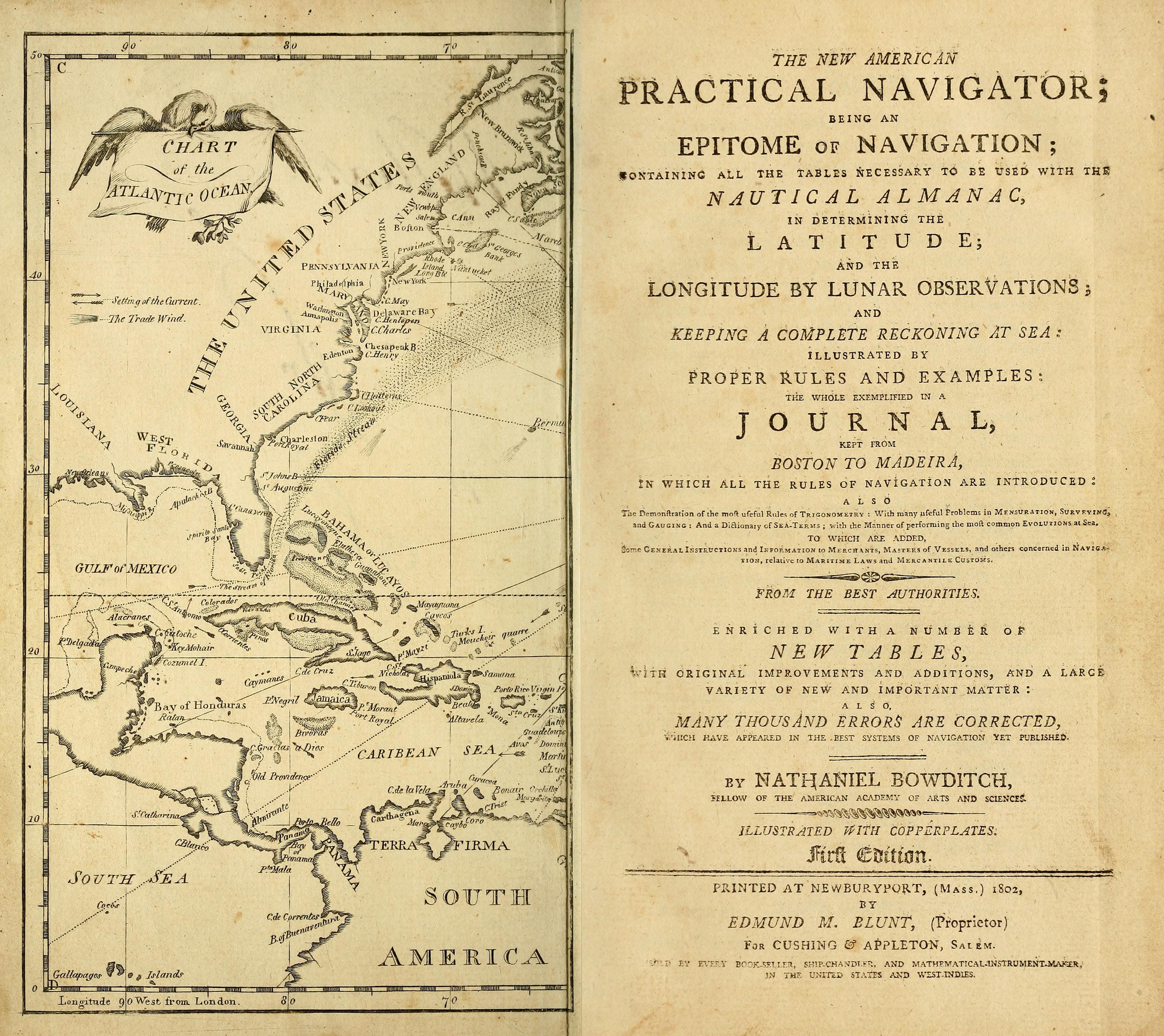
The U.S. Naval Observatory copy of the first edition "Bowditch" has the imprint "Printed at Newburyport (Mass.) 1802.

General reference nautical publications are available from government authorities and publishers, such as Witherbys and Adlard Coles Nautical. They cover a wide range of subjects, such as navigation, passage planning, seamanship, the use of Radar and ARPA, anchoring and mooring. Guidance publications are also available that cover a wider variety of compliance with international and local maritime regulations, including those of the International Maritime Organization.

Maritime industry bodies such as the International Chamber of Shipping, BIMCO, SIGTTO and OCIMF produce nautical publications on operational subjects published by Witherbys. OCIMF focuses on industry guidance for oil tankers and oil terminals, including the leading industry title International Safety Guide for Tankers and Terminals (the 6th edition was published in 2020). SIGTTO and Witherbys produce nautical operational titles for gas carriers including LNG carriers, for example Liquefied Gas Handling Principles on Ships and in Terminals (LGHP4) was published in 2016.

Cyber security has come under increased focus in the maritime industry since the IMO required cyber security to be addressed under the International Safety Management Code. In 2019, ICS, BIMCO and Witherbys published the Cyber Security Workbook for Onboard Ship Use. The second edition of the nautical workbook was published in 2021.

The American Practical Navigator, written by Nathaniel Bowditch, is an encyclopedia of navigation, valuable handbook on oceanography and meteorology, and contains useful tables and a maritime glossary. In 1866 the copyright and plates were bought by the Hydrographic Office of the United States Navy, and as a U.S. Government publication, it is now available for free online.

=== The World Port Index ===
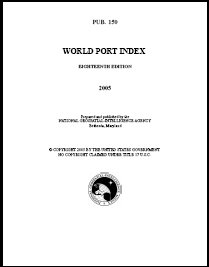
World Port Index

The World Port Index is a US publication issued by the US National Geospatial-Intelligence Agency. It contains a tabular listing of thousands of ports throughout the world, describing their location, characteristics, known facilities, and available services. Of particular interest are the applicable volume of Sailing Directions and the number of the harbor chart. The table is arranged geographically, with an alphabetical index. It is also available from several different independent publishers.

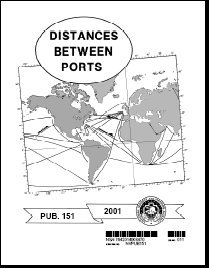
Distances Between Ports

=== Distances Between Ports ===
Distances Between Ports is a US publication produced by the US Defense Mapping Agency Hydrographic Topographic Center and issued by the National Oceanic and Atmospheric Administration and the United States Department of Commerce. It lists the distances between major ports. Reciprocal distances between two ports may differ due to different routes chosen because of currents and climatic conditions. To reduce the number of listings needed, junction points along major routes are used to consolidate routes converging from different directions. It is also available from several different independent publishers.
