= Rescue craft =

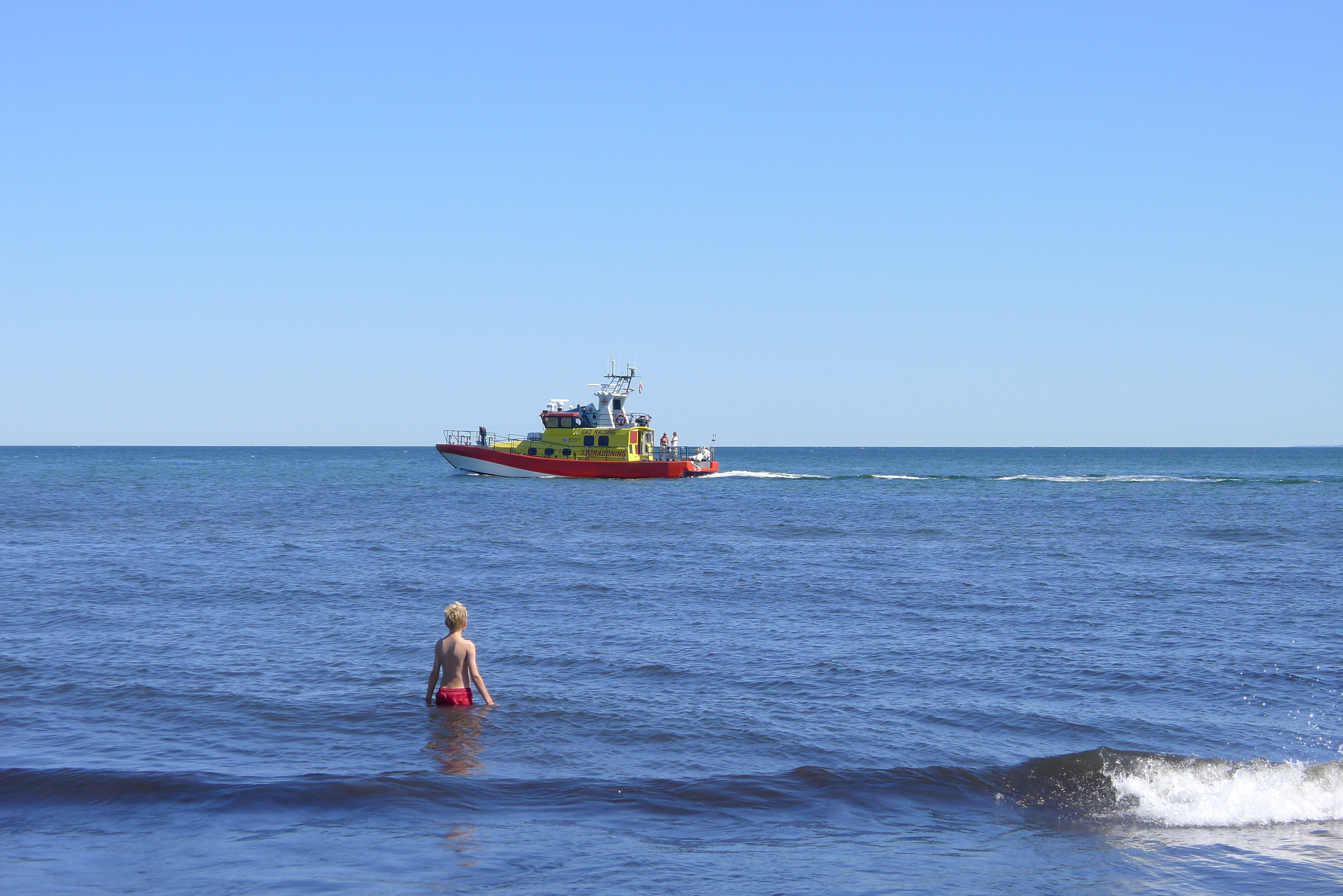
Swedish Sea Rescue Society's Rescue Gad Rausing, stationed in Skillinge, outside Mälarhusen 2013.

A rescue craft is a boat, ship or aircraft used in rescuing.

The most common are lifeboats for inshore and closer-to-shore rescues, with helicopters and ships used further out.

Most government agencies rely on larger ships for rescues further from shore such as Royal Navy ships in the UK and Coast Guard Cutters used in the US. Similarly, the UK rescues use both Royal Air Force SAR and UK Coastguard personnel for helicopter rescues, and in the US the United States Coast Guard is tapped.

== History ==
=== Sea ===
There were attempts as early as the 14th century to aid shipwreck victims with the Chinese training in resuscitation for the drowning, as well as in Portugal and Sweden in the 1690s ordering that ships should be sent to sea to rescue shipwreck survivors. The first mention of lifeboats was in China where boats were used to rescue people from the rivers in 1737.

=== Air ===
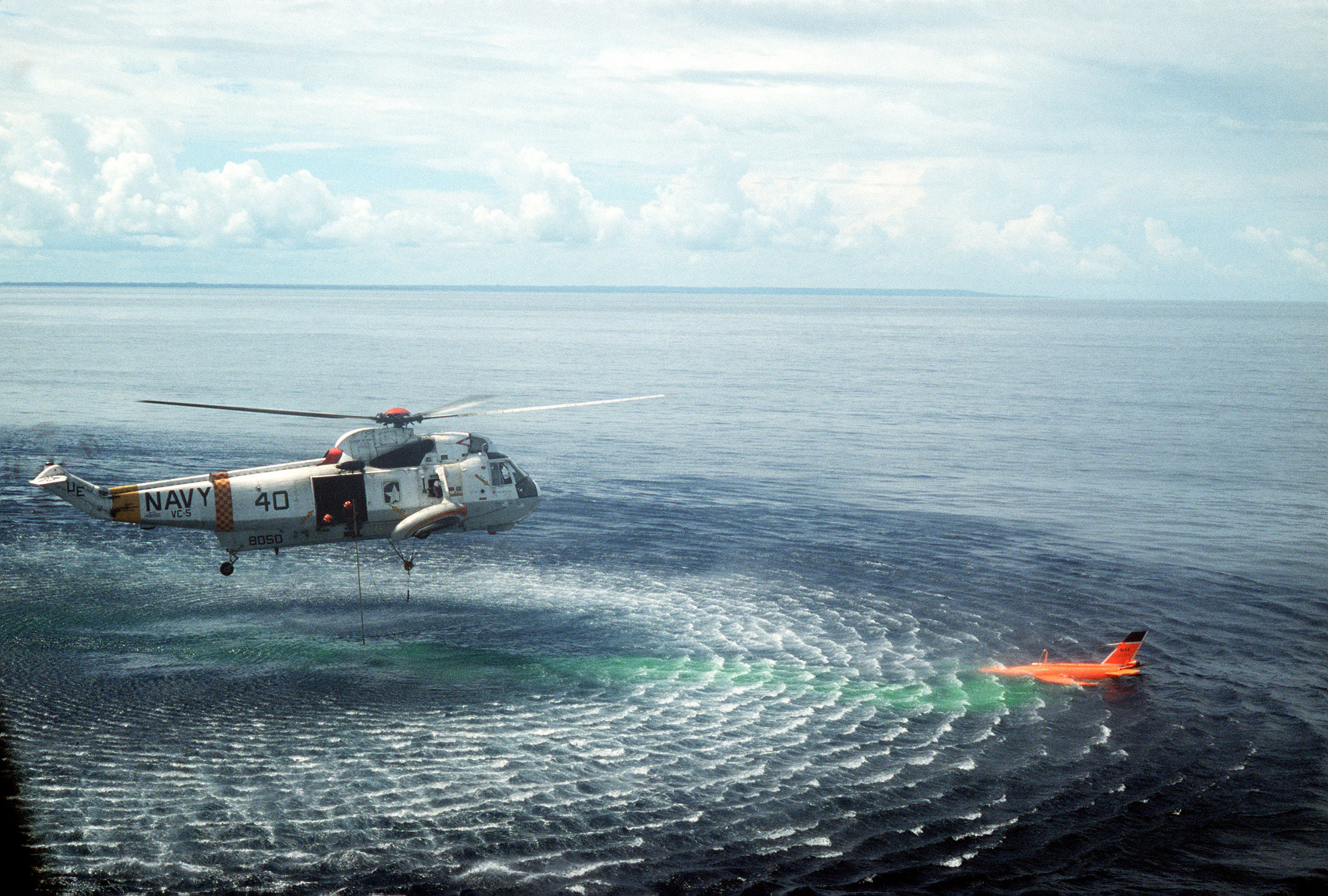
A U.S. Navy Sea King approaching a downed Firebee drone.

The development of the seaplane meant that aircraft could be used to rescue people, but was limited as they could not land or take off in heavy seas.

Helicopters overcame this problem as they were able to hover over the victim and give aid by dropping a line to them with either a basket or diver to assist their extraction.

== Modern rescue craft ==
=== Sea ===
Many types of boats and ships are used, ranging from two-man inflatables, such as inflatable rescue boats, rigid inflatable boats, and larger, purpose-built vessels.

For offshore and far from coast rescue operations, most countries rely on naval or coast guard ships.

For submarines which have encountered difficulty, there are highly-specialised rescue submarines and support ships such as the NATO NSRS and the US's deep-submergence rescue vehicle.

== Inland or shallow water ==
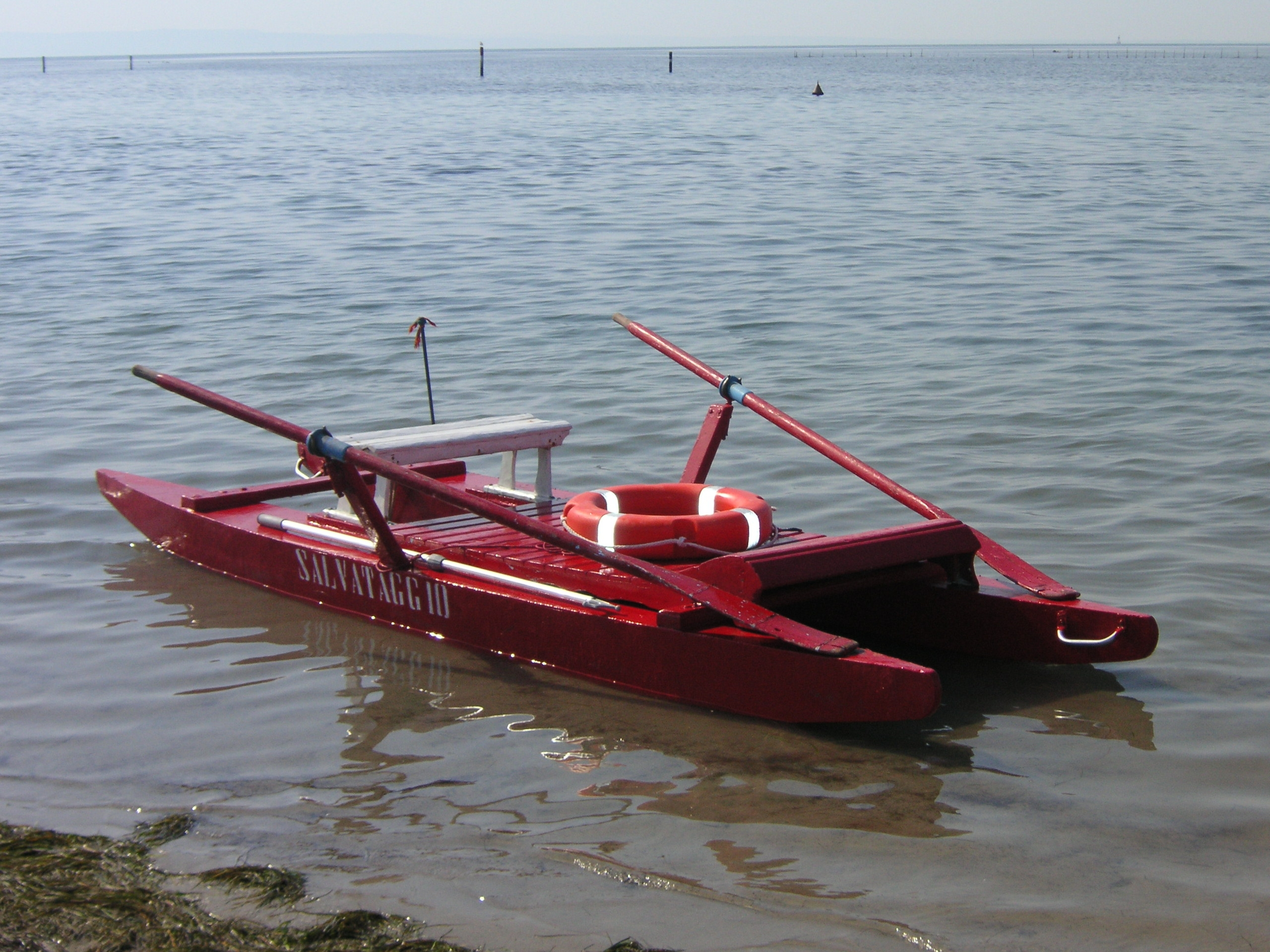
A primitive rescue boat, Grado, Italy, 2006.

There are still smaller boats which may be used on inland waters such as lakes or estuaries where the waters are generally calmer and shallow. These boats are often hand powered.
