= Maritime resource management =

Human factors training programme

Maritime resource management (MRM) or bridge resource management (BRM) is a set of human factors and soft skills training aimed at the maritime industry. The MRM training programme was launched in 1993 – at that time under the name bridge resource management – and aims at preventing accidents at sea caused by human error.

In MRM training it is assumed that there is a strong correlation between the attitudes and behaviours of the seafarers on board a ship and the cultures that these seafarers belong to. The most relevant cultures in this respect being the professional, national, and organizational cultures. Important target groups for MRM training are therefore, besides ships’ officers and crew, all people in shore organisations who have an influence on safety at sea and the work on board a ship.

== Overview ==
=== Definition ===
MRM is the use and co-ordination of all the skills, knowledge, experience, and resources available to the team to achieve the established goals of safety and efficiency of a voyage or any other safety critical task.

=== Target groups ===
Ships’ officers, engineers, pilots, and shore-based personnel.

=== Objectives of training ===
To motivate the team – if necessary – to change its behaviour to good resource management practices during everyday operations. This includes understanding of the importance of good management and teamwork and the willingness to change behaviour. An overall objective is to increase safety, efficiency, and job satisfaction in shipping companies and, eventually, in the maritime industry as a whole.

=== Technical vs. non-technical training ===
During everyday operation on board a ship, technical and non-technical skills are integrated into each other, to perform tasks as safely and efficiently as possible. The technical skills are related to a specific department, job, function, rank, or task. These are the skills traditionally focused on in the maritime industry, and what has since long been covered in the International Convention on Standards of Training, Certification, and Watchkeeping for Seafarers (STCW).

MRM is human factors training. This kind of training is sometimes referred to as soft skills training or non-technical training, and was through the Manila Amendments introduced in the STCW. As opposed to technical training, non-technical training is generic, i.e. applicable to all. While most technical training has to be carried out with groups kept apart – divided into, for example, deck and engine – the non-technical training may be carried out with no separation of people at all. According to the MRM training concept, MRM training should be carried out as a separate training course without mixing it with technical issues. The purpose is to bring disciplines and ranks together in the same training class, providing them with the same course contents, terminology, and training objectives. The aim is to tear down barriers between people, departments, ship, and shore, open up for efficient communication, and establish a genuine safety culture within the whole organisation.

=== Development ===
The MRM training concept is developed from similar type of training carried out in the aviation industry. An important event that triggered resource management training in aviation was the Tenerife airport disaster - a collision on the runway of the Los Rodeos Airport on the island of Tenerife on 27 March 1977 between two Boeing 747 airliners. The accident resulted in the highest number of fatalities in aviation history – 583 people lost their lives. Contributing causes of this accident were; fog, stress, communication misunderstandings, and a lack of monitoring and challenging errors.

Resource management training in the United States are usually traced back to 1979 when a workshop sponsored by NASA, Resource Management on the Flightdeck, took place. This workshop was the result of NASA research into the causes of air transport accidents. Research presented at the workshop identified the human error aspects of the majority of air crashes as failures of interpersonal communications, decision making, and leadership. At this meeting, the label cockpit resource management (CRM) was applied to the training of aircraft crews aiming at reducing pilot error.

In the beginning of the 1990s, eight entities gathered with the objective of converting the airline industry's cockpit resource management training to a course aimed at the maritime industry. These entities were:

- Dutch Maritime Pilots’ Corporation
- Finnish Maritime Administration
- Norwegian Shipowners’ Association
- SAS Flight Academy
- Silja Line
- Swedish Maritime Administration
- Swedish Shipowners’ Association
- The Swedish Club

The first course, which was launched in June 1993, was called bridge resource management, or BRM, because it was believed to be the most accurate translation of cockpit resource management. The cockpit on board a ship is known as the bridge.

In 2003 the name of the approach was changed from bridge resource management to maritime resource management. The main purpose was to increase attraction amongst other important target groups besides masters, bridge officers, and maritime pilots. Such target groups included engineers and shore-based personnel. Before that, the aviation industry had changed the meaning of CRM from cockpit resource management to crew resource management.

=== Different course labels ===
Since the launch of resource management training in the maritime industry, courses have emerged with similar names. Such terms include bridge resource management (BRM), engine-room resource management (ERM), vessel resource management (VRM), crew resource management (CRM), maritime crew resource management (MCRM), etc.

==== Concerns ====
Due to the lack of a uniform standard in the maritime industry, contents, concept, and quality of training of these courses differ. A consequence could be that the initial objectives concerning safety improvements will not be met. In some courses the focus is more on technical issues than on non-technical issues which was not the intention when resource management training was first introduced in the maritime industry. Resource management training is sometimes also confused with bridge team management (BTM) training which usually is a technical skills training course aimed at the deck department.

== Focus of training ==
Training of seafarers are regulated through the International Convention on Standards of Training, Certification, and Watchkeeping for Seafarers (STCW). The STCW training requirements concern the seafarers, the people at the sharp end. At the sharp end we find the frontline operators, the people actually doing the task. The blunt end is further away from the action itself. The blunt end is the environment in which the seafarers work. Regulators, designers, shore-side owners and managers function at the blunt end.

=== Active errors and latent errors ===
Active errors occur at the sharp end of the process. The effect of active errors are felt almost immediately. Active errors could be; making a course change at the wrong position, pushing an incorrect button, forgetting to close a valve. Latent errors occur at the blunt end. These are errors, removed in both time and space from the operators at the sharp end, that may lie dormant within the system for a long time. Examples of latent errors may include; equipment design flaws that make the human-machine interface less than intuitive, or organizational flaws, such as staffing and training decisions made for fiscal reasons increasing the likelihood of errors. Latent errors are often unrecognized and have the capacity to result in multiple types of active errors. Analyses of major accidents involving many different areas of society indicate that latent errors pose the greatest risk to safety in a complex system. Such accidents include Three Mile Island accident, Heysel Stadium disaster, Bhopal disaster, Chernobyl disaster, Space Shuttle Challenger disaster, King's Cross fire, Piper Alpha and Herald of Free Enterprise.

=== Just culture ===
The culture of the maritime industry has traditionally been characterised as a blame culture where seafarers risk not only dismissal but also criminal prosecution for being involved in accidents. Recent examples of such accidents are the MV Erika and Hebei Spirit, where the blame was placed on the ship's Master, vis a vis the company / system. To increase safety and facilitate the reporting and sharing of safety data, as required by the International Safety Management (ISM) Code, the industry has identified a need to move towards a no blame culture or a just culture. The just culture term has gained in popularity since no blame may be seen as not accountable. The International Civil Aviation Organisation (ICAO) has defined just culture as; "A culture in which frontline operators or others are not punished for actions, omissions or decisions taken by them that are commensurate with their experience and training, but where gross negligence, wilful violations, and destructive acts are not tolerated."

The target groups and objectives of MRM training extend beyond the requirements of the STCW Convention. MRM training focuses on both active and latent errors and has as an objective to establish a just culture across the maritime industry. Shore-side managers, accident investigators and regulators are therefore important target groups for MRM training.

== Training providers ==
MRM training providers include maritime universities and training centres, ship owners and ship managers, manning agencies, pilot associations, and seafarer associations.

== Training method ==
=== Workshops ===
The learning process in the MRM course takes place in workshops, one workshop per course module. In the workshops, conducted by a specially trained workshop leader, the trainees work together with 8-12 other trainees, sometimes in smaller groups. Case studies and situation analysis are performed, during which comparison between others’ and own attitudes and opinions are made. The MRM course is rather increasing the tendency, or willingness, to apply the skills than teaching the skills. This is a matter of changing attitudes.

=== Computer-based training ===
As a preparation for each workshop, the trainee learns basic facts about human behaviour and interaction. This is done by means of computer-based training, or CBT. The CBT program also contains scripted drama examples of good and bad management situations. The CBT is carried out individually or in group.

=== Case studies ===
An important part of the course is case studies of real accidents and incidents with analysis using MRM terminology.

=== Facilitation techniques ===
Instruction and facilitation are two main techniques that are available to trainers. Instruction is primarily a telling activity, where knowledge and skills are developed in trainees through either direct communication or demonstration. Facilitation on the other hand, can be described as a technique that helps trainees to discover for themselves what is appropriate and effective. Both techniques are useful and have their place. In order to transfer knowledge, instruction is the most efficient technique to employ. However, trying to encourage appropriate attitudes using instruction as the technique, normally has limited success. People, particularly adults, do not like being told how to behave and what to think.

In MRM training, facilitation is the technique primarily used.

=== Refresher training ===
Refresher training is considered a critical success factor for long-lasting results from resource management training. In the maritime industry this is most often done through shorter courses summarising the core MRM modules - focusing on recently added course material and analyses of recent accident cases. Shipping companies also refresh MRM contents during officer and crew conferences and in the daily communication with the ships.

== STCW Manila Amendments ==
Major revisions to the International Convention on Standards of Training, Certification and Watchkeeping for Seafarers (the STCW Convention), and its associated Code were adopted at a Diplomatic Conference in Manila, the Philippines, on 21–25 June 2010. The amendments, to be known as “The Manila amendments to the STCW Convention and Code” entered into force on 1 January 2012 with full compliance by 1 January 2017. Amongst the amendments adopted, there are a number of important changes to the Convention and Code. The sections of the STCW Manila Amendments that contain requirements related to non-technical skills are:

- Reg. A-II/1 for Bridge Resource Management
- Reg. A-III/1 for Engine-room Resource Management
- Reg. A-II/2 and A-III/2 for Use Leadership and Managerial Skills
- Reg. A-II/1, A-III/1 and A-III/6 for Application of Leadership and Teamworking Skills

On 14 February 2012, the Maritime Department of the Swedish Transport Agency certified that the MRM course meets the above-mentioned requirements of the STCW 1978 Convention as amended by the 2010 Manila Amendments.
