= Deck department =

Unit aboard naval and merchant ships

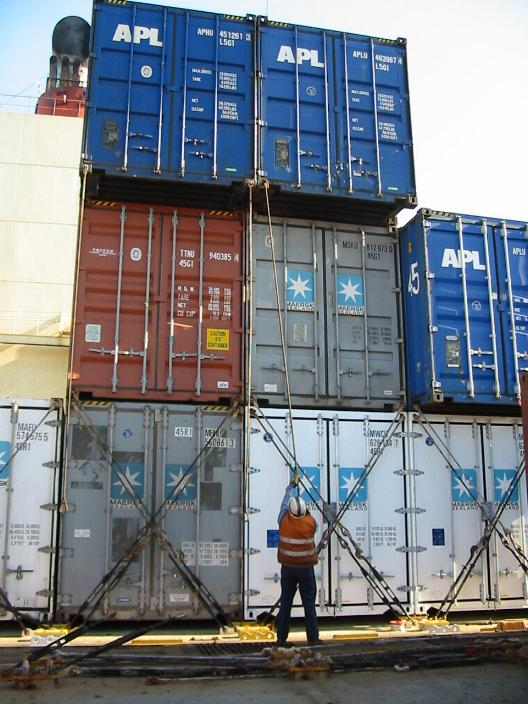
The deck department is responsible for safely receiving, discharging, and caring for cargo during a voyage.

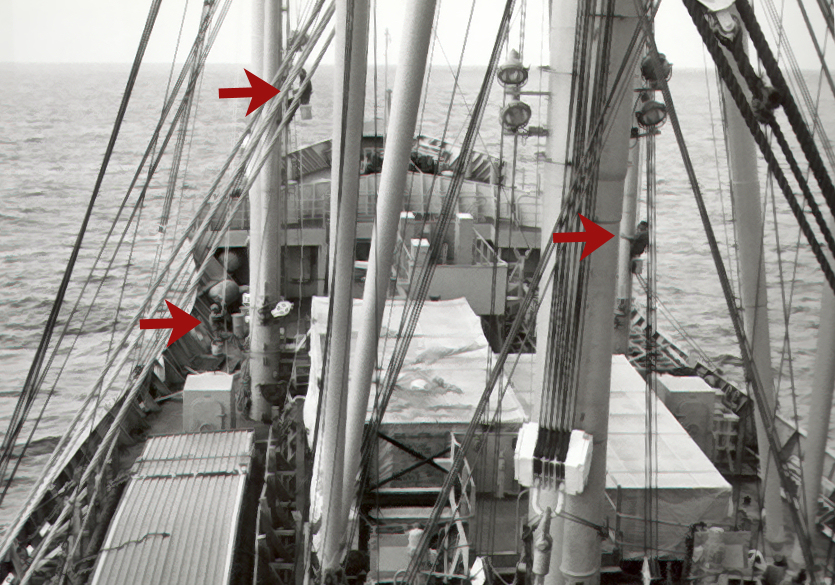
The ship's bosun, an able seaman (AB) day worker, and a watchstander AB are seen here working aloft aboard a U.S. freighter to maintain cargo rigging.

The deck department is an organisational team on board naval and merchant ships. Seafarers in the deck department work a variety of jobs on a ship or vessel, but primarily they will carry out the navigation of a vessel from the bridge. However, they are usually also responsible for supervising and monitoring any maritime cargo on board, as well as ensuring maintenance of the deck and upper hull structure, monitoring the stability of the ship, including loading and discharging ballast water, carrying out mooring operations, and finally anchoring a ship.

Among the merchant fleets of countries that have ratified the STCW Convention, the department and its manning requirements, including the responsibilities of each rank are regulated by that STCW Convention. The department is led by deck officers, who are licensed mariners, and they are commanded overall by the ship's captain.

== Merchant shipping ==
The deck department is divided into deck officers and ratings. All ranks in the deck department are required to have undertaken training in accordance with the STCW Convention, for fleets of those countries who have ratified it. For officers this involves the passing of an exam to receive a certificate of competency, the level of understanding and certification varies according to ship size. All ranks are required to have undertaken generic maritime training, which usually involves time at sea and time in an approved college. International standards under the STCW Code set out the minimum requirements for training, however individual nations also have their own maritime training regulations. For example, in the United Kingdom the Maritime and Coastguard Agency ensure that the deck department receive training and examinations in order to assume the responsibilities of their rank at sea. Under the STCW, all seafarers of the deck department are also required to have undertaken a series of short course training. This includes general security, safety and lifeboat training, as well as vessel-specific training, such as operations in the polar regions and on tankers.

In general, the master or captain is in overall command of the ship, while the chief mate is the head of the deck department. This often involves administrative tasks such as scheduling work, quality control, coordinating with other departments, and conflict resolution. The chief mate also usually compiles supply, overtime, and cost control records, and requisitions or purchases stores and equipment. Depending on the number of officers carried, he may or may not be a watch officer.

For example, if the ship carries a second mate and two third mates, he will be a dayworker, with an example duty day from 0800 to 1700 ship's time. If only one third mate is carried, he could stand the 4 to 8 watch in addition to handling his executive duties. The ship's other deck officers, generally a second mate and third mate, are also members of the deck department. In general, the watch officer is responsible for the unlicensed crewmen on his watch. In a four-mate ship where the chief mate is a dayworker, the second mate will usually stand the 4 to 8 watch, because sunrise and sunset often fall on that watch. In the days before satellite navigation systems, the second mate would shoot morning and evening star fixes to determine the ship's position. On many vessels, the second mate is also responsible for maintaining the ship's charts and navigational publications, the ship's gyrocompass, and all navigational gear. He also keeps the log extract for each voyage used by company management. This sheet is often called the "howgozit" sheet, and often includes information about time at sea, time under pilotage, time in port, and types and tonnages of cargoes moved.

The two third mates are often called the senior third and the junior third. The senior third mate could stand the 12 to 4 watch, the junior third the 8 to 12 watch. While on duty, they are responsible for handling the ship and fixing its position by shooting sun lines, taking hourly fixes from the satellite navigation gear, and piloting the ship in coastal waters. The senior third often also prepares the noon position slip for the use of the captain and chief engineer.

== Naval usage ==
In the military, the deck department comprises sailors who perform a variety of functions depending on ship type and size.

Examples include maintenance and upkeep of the ship, handling of the ship's rigging and ground tackle, coordination of underway replenishment operations, conductance of minesweeping operations, maintenance and operation of the ship's boats, supervision of diving and salvage operations (including towing), and serving as shipboard seamanship specialists. Undesignated seamen, or those who have not selected a rating (e.g. job or vocation), are normally the most junior sailors on board and are usually sent to the deck department for their first assignment.

== See also ==
- Engine department
