= Electronic navigation =

Electronic navigation are forms of navigation that ships, land vehicles, and people can use, which rely on technology powered by electricity.

Methods of electronic navigation include:

- Satellite navigation, satellite navigation systems
- Radio navigation, the application of radio frequencies to determine a position
- Radar navigation, the use of radar to determine position relative to known objects

== See also ==
- Electronic navigational chart
- Robot navigation
- Navigation system
