= Under keel clearance =

Height of water under a keel

In seafaring, under keel clearance (UKC) is the vertical distance between seabed and the keel or hull of a ship. It is used to ensure sufficient navigable water is available for ships at sea. Master mariners should ensure there is sufficient minimum UKC for their ships; ports should ensure sufficient minimum UKC for the type and draft of ships due to arrive in the port. Ships typically calculate their UKC to meet criteria for ports to minimise the risk of maritime incidents. The minimum UKC determined includes a safety margin.

== Methods of calculation ==
At a basic level, it is typically calculated in metres using the formula:

UKC = Charted Depth − Draft -/+ Height of Tide

Ship masters and deck officers can obtain the depth of water from Electronic navigational charts. More dynamic or advanced calculations include safety margins for manoeuvring effects and squat.

Computer systems and software can be used to manage and calculate UKC for ships and ports. These include systems that dynamically manage UKC using models, forecasting and calculations.

The International Hydrographic Organization (IHO) sets a Standard for UKC Management for software and systems: S-129 Under Keel Clearance Management.

== Uses and requirements ==
For US waters, the US Code of Federal Regulations require ships and their masters to calculate UKC based on the ship's deepest navigational draft.33 CFR 157.450 The regulations require the master to discuss the UKC calculation with the maritime pilot as the ship approaches US ports/waters.33 CFR 157.450

The Australian Maritime Safety Authority state that maintaining adequate UKC is important for safe navigation in the Torres Strait.

Inadequate UKC, caused by shallow water and squat may lead to ship groundings. In 2019, the UK Marine Accident Investigation Branch found that indequate UKC contributed towards the grounding of the ro/ro freight ferry MS Stena Performer.

Changes in water level may cause issues with adequate UKC for ships. For example, recent water level reductions in the Panama Canal have reduced UKC for ships meaning some ships are not able to transit the canal.
