= World Port Index =

U.S. government listing of the world's harbors

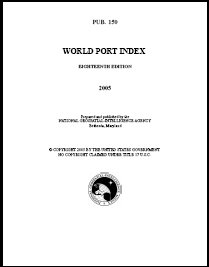
The front cover of the World Port Index, published by the National Geospatial-Intelligence Agency

The World Port Index (PUB 150) contains a tabular listing of thousands of ports throughout the world, describing their location, characteristics, known facilities, and available services. Of particular interest are the applicable volume of Sailing Directions and the number of the harbor chart. The table is arranged geographically, with an alphabetical index.

The selection of these places is based on criteria established by the National Geospatial-Intelligence Agency. They are not random choices. The applicable chart and Sailing Directions is given for each place listed.

In order to present such a large amount of diversified data in a single volume of convenient size, a simple code is used to indicate certain types of information. The code symbols are explained at the top of each page of text.

This book is corrected by the National Geospatial-Intelligence Agency.

== Data availability ==
In addition to the published text edition of the World Port Index, the National Geospatial-Intelligence Agency also makes the data available in tabular and spatial formats. This includes Microsoft Access database and Esri Shapefile formats. Archived publications are also available with past Access databases dating to 2000 and Shapefiles dating to 2010. The data is available from the National Geospatial-Intelligence Agency's World Port Index webpage.

== Sources ==
The text of this article originated from the preface of the World Port Index and section 413 of The American Practical Navigator. These documents are produced by the government of the United States of America and in the public domain.

== See also ==
- American Practical Navigator
- Coast Pilots
- Distances Between Ports
- List of Lights
- Local Notice to Mariners
- Notice to Mariners
- Sailing Directions
