= Navigator =

Crew position responsible for navigation of an aircraft or vessel

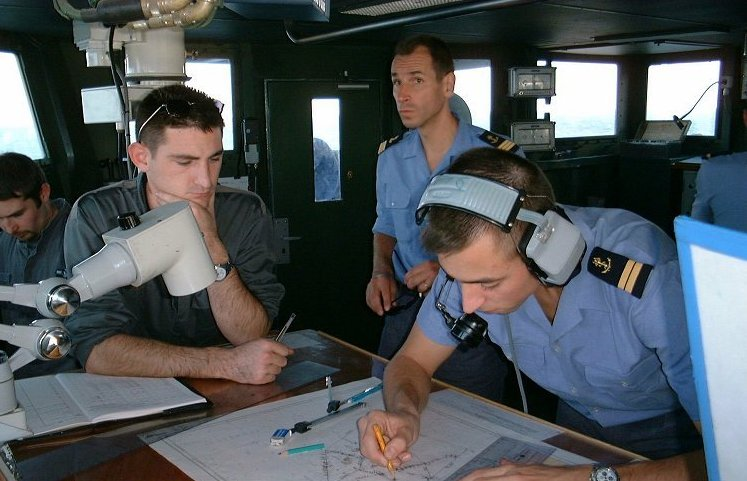
A navigator

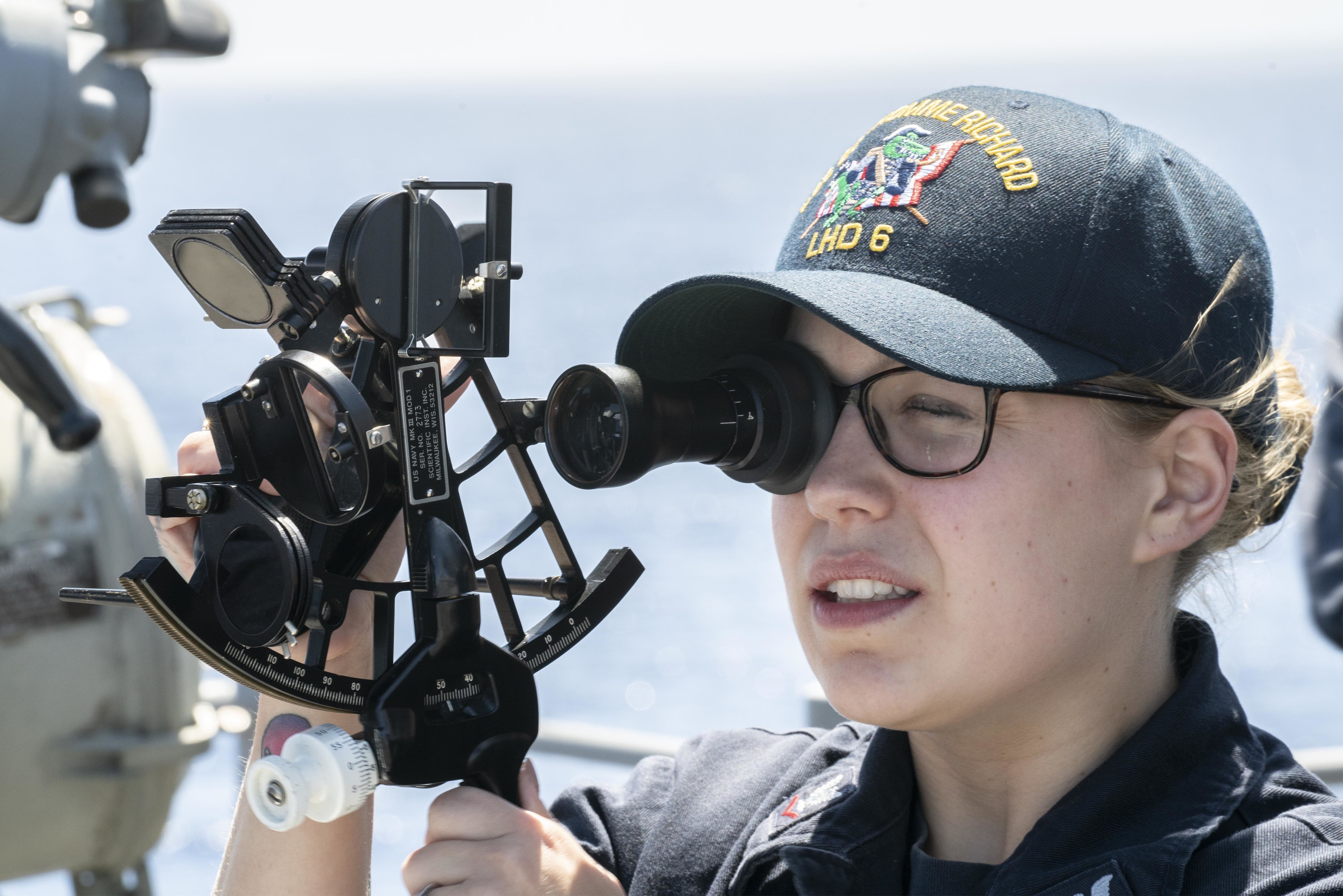
U.S. Navy personnel practice using a sextant as part of a celestial navigation training, 2018

A navigator is the person on board a ship or aircraft responsible for its navigation. The navigator's primary responsibility is to be aware of ship or aircraft position at all times. Responsibilities include planning the journey, advising the ship's captain or aircraft commander of estimated timing to destinations while en route, and ensuring hazards are avoided. The navigator is in charge of maintaining the aircraft or ship's nautical charts, nautical publications, and navigational equipment, and they generally have responsibility for meteorological equipment and communications. With the advent of satellite navigation, the effort required to accurately determine one's position has decreased by orders of magnitude, so the entire field has experienced a revolutionary transition since the 1990s with traditional navigation tasks, like performing celestial navigation, being used less frequently. Using multiple independent position fix methods without solely relying on electronic systems subject to failure helps the navigator detect errors. Professional mariners are still proficient in traditional piloting and celestial navigation.

== In naval occupations ==
Shipborne navigators in the U.S. Navy are normally surface warfare officer qualified with the exception of naval aviators and naval flight officers assigned to ship's navigator billets aboard aircraft carriers and large deck amphibious assault ships and who have been qualified at a level equal to surface warfare officers. U.S. Coast Guard officers that are shipboard navigators are normally cutter qualified at a level analogous to the USN officers previously mentioned. Quartermasters are the navigator's enlisted assistants and perform most of the technical navigation duties.

Aboard ships in the Merchant Marine and Merchant Navy, the second mate is generally the (senior) navigator.

== In aviation ==
Navigators are sometimes also called 'air navigators' or 'flight navigators'. In civil aviation this was a position on older aircraft, typically between the late-1910s and the 1970s, where separate crew members (sometimes two navigation crew members) were often responsible for an aircraft's flight navigation, including its dead reckoning and celestial navigation, especially when flown over oceans or other large featureless areas where radio navigation aids were not originally available. As sophisticated electronic air navigation aids and universal space-based GPS navigation systems came online, the dedicated Navigator's position was discontinued and its function was assumed by dual-licensed Pilot-Navigators, and still later by the aircraft's primary pilots (Captain and First Officer), resulting in a continued downsizing in the number of aircrew positions on commercial flights. Modern electronic navigation systems made the civil aviation navigators redundant by the early 1980s.

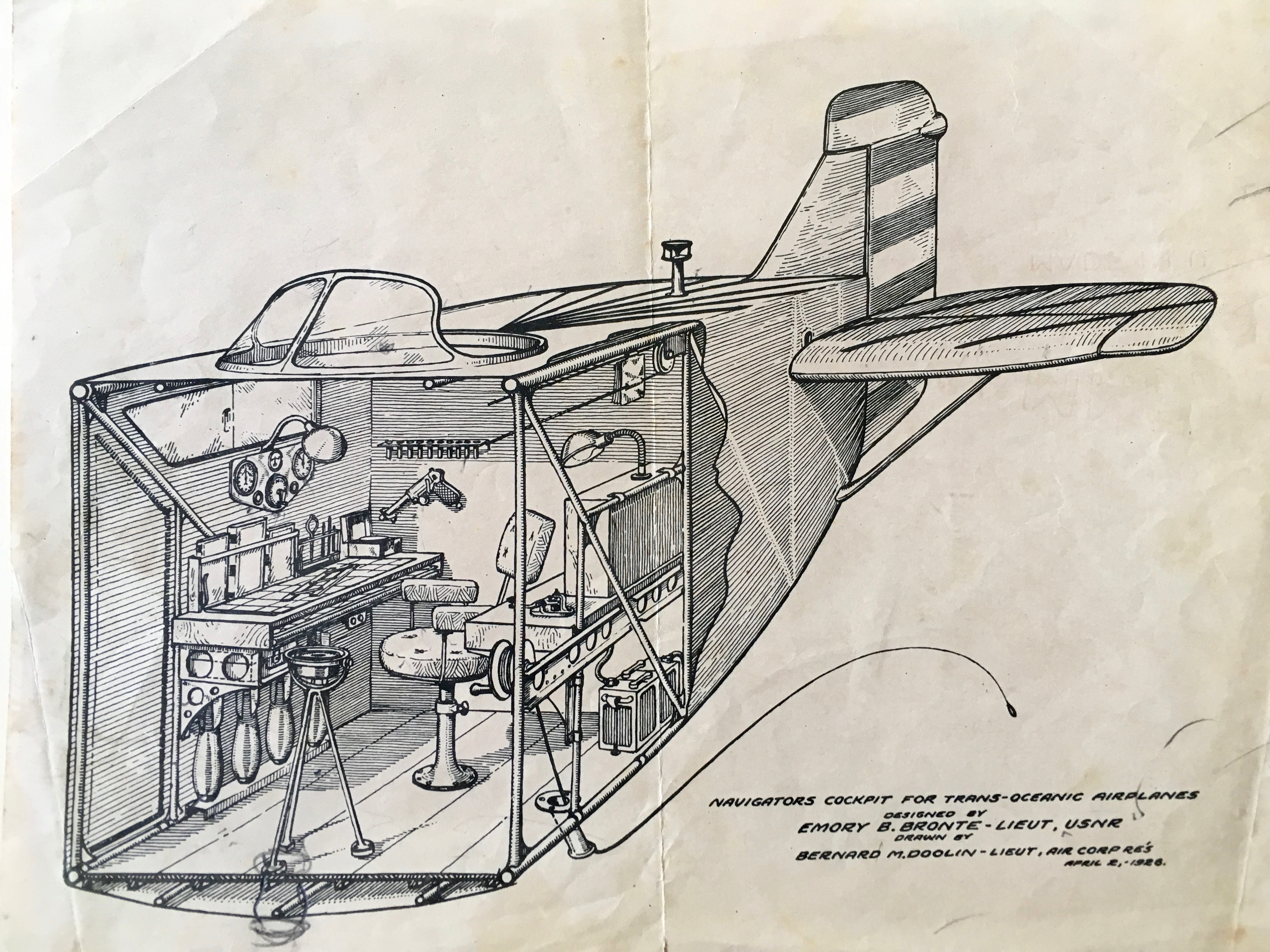
Navigators cockpit 1928

In military aviation, navigators are still actively trained and licensed in some present day air forces, as electronic navigation aids cannot be assumed to be operational during wartime. In the world's air forces, modern navigators are frequently tasked with weapons and defensive systems operations, along with co-pilot duties such as flight planning and fuel management, depending on the type, model and series of aircraft. In the U.S. Air Force, the aeronautical rating of navigator has been augmented by addition of the combat systems officer, while in the U.S. Navy and U.S. Marine Corps, those officers formerly called navigators, tactical systems officers, or naval aviation observers have been known as naval flight officers since the mid-1960s. USAF navigators/combat systems officers and USN/USMC naval flight officers must be basic mission qualified in their aircraft, or fly with an instructor navigator or instructor NFO to provide the necessary training for their duties.

== Nautical charts ==
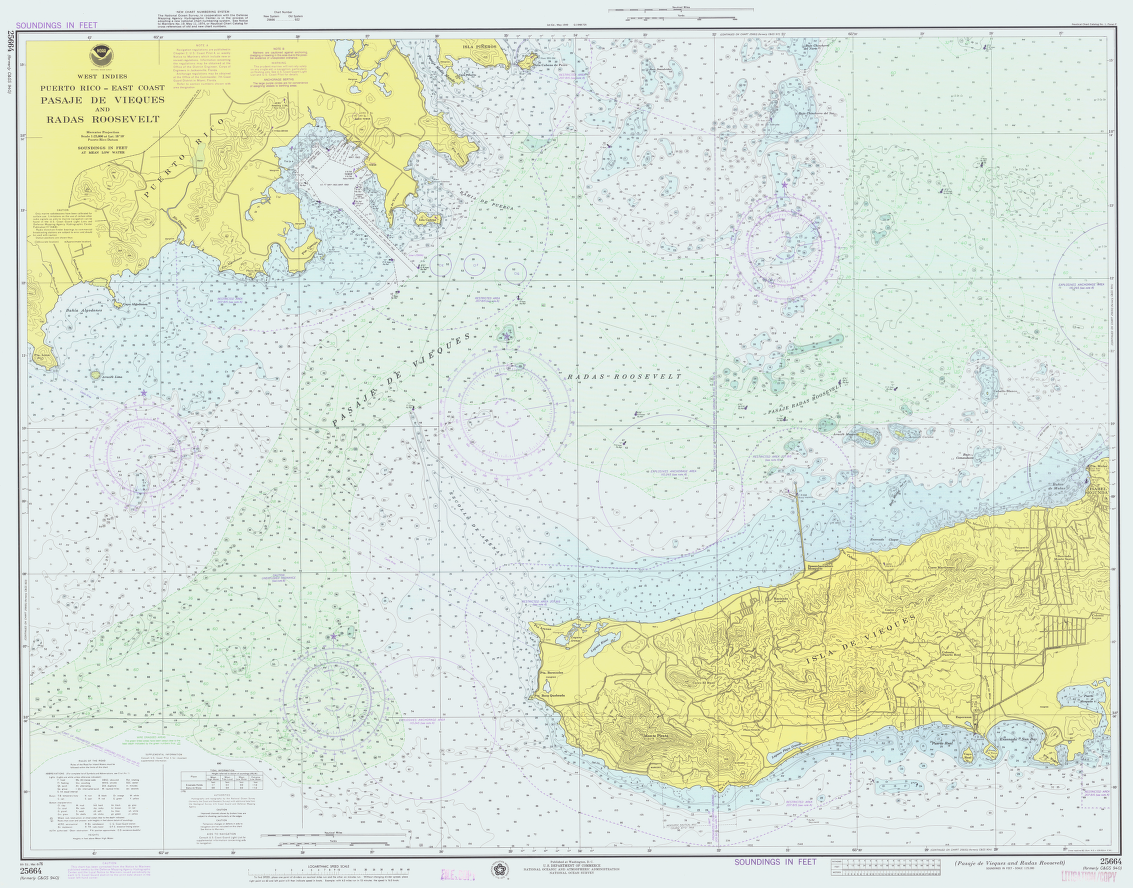
A 1976 United States NOAA chart of part of Puerto Rico

A naval ship's navigator is responsible for buying and maintaining its nautical charts. A nautical chart, or simply "chart", is a graphic representation of a maritime or flight region and adjacent coastal regions. Depending on the scale of the chart, it may show depths of water and heights of land, natural features of the seabed, details of the coastline, navigational hazards, locations of natural and man-made aids to navigation, information on tides and currents, local details of the Earth's magnetic field, restricted flying areas, and man-made structures such as harbors, buildings and bridges. Nautical charts are essential tools for marine navigation; many countries require vessels, especially commercial ships, to carry them. Nautical charting may take the form of charts printed on paper or computerised electronic navigational charts.

The nature of a waterway depicted by a chart changes regularly, and a mariner navigating on an old or uncorrected chart is courting disaster. Every producer of navigational charts also provides a system to inform mariners and aviators of changes that affect the chart. In the United States, chart corrections and notifications of new editions are provided by various governmental agencies by way of Notices to Airmen (NOTAMs), Notice to Mariners, Local Notice to Mariners, Summary of Corrections, and Broadcast Notice to Mariners. Radio broadcasts give advance notice of urgent corrections.

A convenient way to keep track of corrections is with a "chart and publication correction record card" system. Using this system, the navigator does not immediately update every chart in the portfolio when a new Notice to Mariners arrives, instead creating a card for every chart and noting the correction on this card. When the time comes to use the chart, the navigator pulls the chart and chart's card, and makes the indicated corrections on the chart. This system ensures that every chart is properly corrected prior to use. British merchant vessels receive weekly Notices to Mariners issued by the Admiralty. When corrections are received all charts are corrected in the ship's folio and recorded in NP133A (Admiralty Chart Correction Log and Folio Index). This system ensures that all charts are corrected and up to date. In a deep-sea vessel with a folio of over three thousand charts this can be a laborious and time-consuming task for the navigator.

Various and diverse methods exist for the correction of electronic navigational charts.

== Nautical publications ==
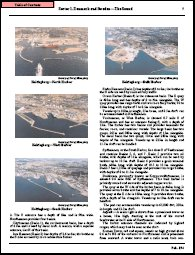
This page from a Sailing Directions assists the navigator by providing pictures and descriptions of a harbor approach.

The term nautical publications is used in maritime circles to describe a set of publications, generally published by national governments, for use in safe navigation of ships, boats, and similar vessels.

The nature of waterways described by any given nautical publication changes regularly, and a mariner navigating by use of an old or uncorrected publication is courting disaster. Every producer of nautical publications also provides a system to inform mariners of changes that affect the chart. In the United States, corrections and notifications of new editions are provided by various governmental agencies by way of Notice to Mariners, Local Notice to Mariners, Summary of Corrections, and Broadcast Notice to Mariners. Radio broadcasts give advance notice of urgent corrections. For ensuring that all publications are fully up-to-date, similar methods are employed as for nautical charts. Various and diverse methods exist for the correction of electronic nautical publications.

== Mission and passage planning ==
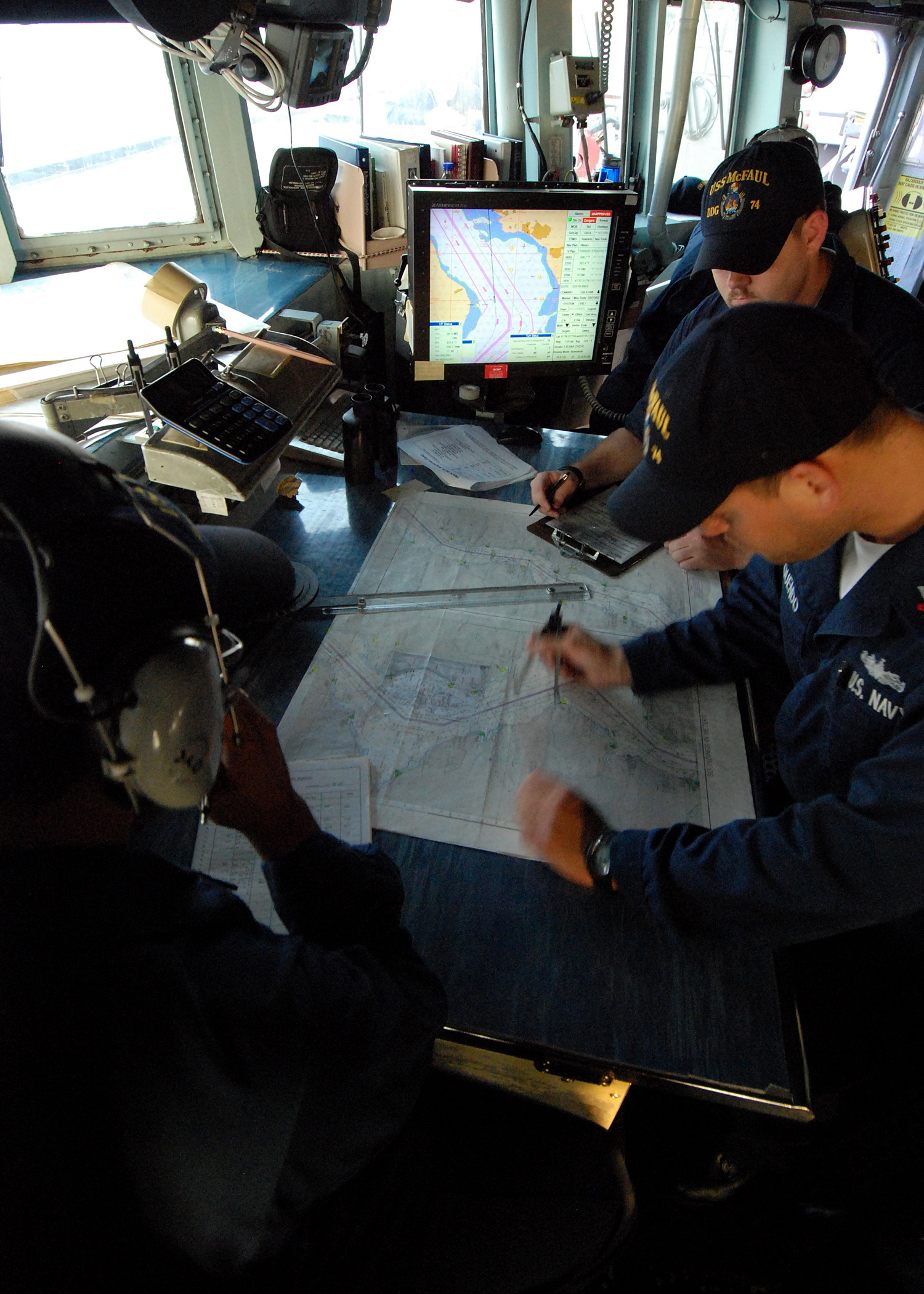
USS McFaul (DDG 74) personnel using electronic systems and a navigation chart while she transits through the Turkish Straits

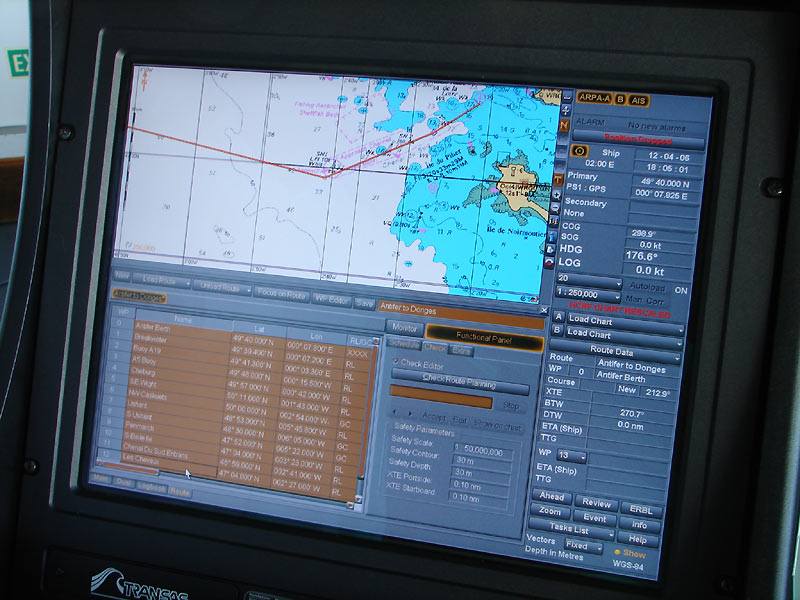
Modern navigators often enter passage plans on electronic systems.

The navigator focuses on creating the ship's passage plans (or "mission plans" for USAF purposes). A mission or passage plan can be summarized as a comprehensive, step by step description of how the voyage is to proceed from berth to berth, including unberthing, departure, the en-route portion of a voyage, approach, and mooring/arrival at the destination.

Before each voyage begins, the navigator should develop a detailed mental model of how the entire voyage will proceed. In the aviation community, this is known as "chair flying". This mental model includes charting courses and forecasting weather, tides, and currents. It includes updating and checking aeronautical charts, nautical publications, which could include Sailing Directions and Coast Pilots, and projecting the various future events including landfalls, narrow passages, and course changes that will transpire during the voyage. This mental model becomes the standard by which the navigator will measure progress toward the goal of a safe and efficient voyage, and it is manifested in a written passage plan.

When working in a team environment, the passage/mission plan should be communicated to the navigation team in a pre-voyage conference (USAF term is "mission briefing") in order to ensure that all members of the team share the same mental model of the entire trip.

Passage planning procedures are specified in International Maritime Organization Resolutions, in the laws of IMO signatory countries (for example, Title 33 of the U.S. Code of Federal Regulations), and a number of professional books and USN/USAF publications. There are some fifty elements of a comprehensive passage plan depending on the size and type of vessel, each applicable according to the individual situation.

A good passage plan will include a track line laid out upon the largest-scale charts available which cover the vessel's track. The navigator will draw and redraw the track line until it is safe, efficient, and in line with all applicable laws and regulations. When the track is finished, it is becoming common practice to also enter it into electronic navigation tools such as an Electronic Chart Display and Information System, a chartplotter, or a GPS unit.

Once the voyage has begun the progress of the vessel along its planned route must be monitored. This requires that the ship's position be determined, using standard methods including dead reckoning, radar fixing, celestial navigation, pilotage, and electronic navigation, to include usage of GPS and navigation computer equipment.

Passage planning software, tide and tidal current predictors, celestial navigational calculators, consumables estimators for fuel, oil, water, and stores, and other useful applications.

== Navigational equipment ==
The navigator is responsible for the maintenance of the ship's navigational equipment. U.S. Air Force navigators are responsible for troubleshooting problems of the navigation equipment while airborne, but the ground Maintenance personnel are ultimately responsible for the repair and upkeep of that aircraft's navigation system.

Boats and ships can use several Global Navigation Satellite Systems (GNSS) to navigate all of the world's lakes, seas and oceans. Maritime GNSS units include functions useful on water, such as "man overboard" (MOB) functions that allow instantly marking the location where a person has fallen overboard, which simplifies rescue efforts. GNSS may be connected to the ships self-steering gear and Chartplotters using the NMEA 0183 interface, and GNSS can also improve the security of shipping traffic by enabling AIS.

== In science fiction ==
Navigators are often part of a starship crew in science fiction, where they are sometimes called astrogators, a merger of the prefix "astro" and "navigator". According to a science fiction citations site for the Oxford English Dictionary, the earliest known use of the word is in David Lasser's 1931 book The Conquest of Space. According to that site and also Brave New Words: The Oxford Dictionary of Science Fiction, it first appeared in science fiction in Stanley G. Weinbaum's short story "The Planet of Doubt", published in the October 1935 issue of Astounding Stories.

The title character of Robert A. Heinlein's 1953 novel Starman Jones is an astrogator.

== See also ==
- Maritime pilot
