= Distances Between Ports =

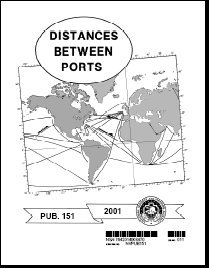
The front cover of Distances Between Ports

Distances Between Ports (PUB 151) is a publication that lists the distances between major ports. Reciprocal distances between two ports may differ due to the different routes of currents and climatic conditions chosen. To reduce the number of listings needed, junction points along major routes are used to consolidate routes converging from different directions.

This book can be most effectively used for voyage planning in conjunction with the proper volume(s) of the Sailing Directions (Planning Guide). It is corrected via the Notice to Mariners.

The positions listed for ports are central positions that most represent each port. The distances are between positions shown for each port and are generally over routes that afford the safest passage. Most of the distances represent the shortest navigable routes, but in some cases, longer routes, that take advantage of favorable currents, have been used. In other cases, increased distances result from routes selected to avoid ice or other dangers to navigation, or to follow required separation schemes.

== Sources ==
The text of this article originated from section 414 of The American Practical Navigator, a document produced by the government of the United States of America.

== See also ==
- American Practical Navigator
- Coast Pilots
- List of Lights
- Local Notice to Mariners
- Notice to Mariners
- Sailing Directions
