= Radio Navigational Aids =

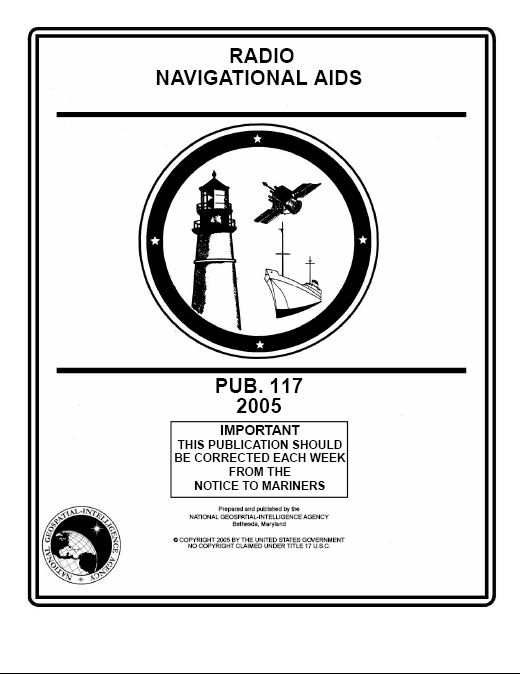
The front cover of Radio Navigational Aids

The Radio Navigational Aids (Publication 117) publication contains a detailed list of selected worldwide radio stations that provide services to the mariner. The publication is divided into chapters according to the nature of the service provided by the radio stations. The services include Radio direction finder and Radar Stations; stations broadcasting navigational warnings, time signals or medical advice; communication traffic for distress, emergency and safety including the Global Maritime Distress Safety System (GMDSS) and long range navigational aids. It also contains chapters describing procedures of the AMVER System, and the interim emergency procedures and communication instructions to be followed by U.S merchant vessels in times of crisis. A new edition of Publication 117 is published annually. This publication is available in its entirety on the website and there are also database queries available for much of the data contained within.

== See also ==
- American Practical Navigator
- Buoy
- Coast Pilots
- Light List
- List of Lights
- Local Notice to Mariners
- Notice to Mariners
- Sailing Directions
- Radio navigation
