= Australian Pilot =

Editions of Sailing Directions for Australian coastal navigators

This title is related to nautical issues, and is not related to aviation in Australia

Australian Pilot is a series of editions of Sailing Directions to navigators in Australian coastal waters.

== Publication ==
Most editions were published by the British Admiralty Hydrographic Department.

The publication was required to be used in conjunction with the British Admiralty Notices to Mariners, nautical charts and any supplements produced. The supplements and annual updates were given the same name as the publications.

The first edition appeared in 1916. The 9th edition appeared in 2004. The different editions included variations of the number of volumes.

Australia had its own Australian Hydrographic Service created in 1920, but the British nautical charts and sailing directions continued to be published after that time. The current Australian version of the Pilot and other relevant information is found in the Marine information manual.

== Materials ==
Most states of Australia have developed maritime safety maps and guides to their coastline that would complement and include the work of the British Admiralty work.

Earlier regional guides preceded Hydrographic services and relied on collation from ships records. Earlier localised guides also existed in some states of Australia.

A system of guides from the United States also exists for the same waters covered by the Australian Pilot.
