= Hydrographic office =

Class of, oft governmental, body who survey a region's waters

A hydrographic office is an organization which is devoted to acquiring and publishing hydrographic information.

Historically, the main tasks of hydrographic offices were the conduction of hydrographic surveys and the publication of nautical charts. In many countries, various navigation-related services are now concentrated in large governmental organizations, sometimes termed "maritime administration" (however, the International Hydrographic Organization uses the term "hydrographic offices" for its member organizations).

Besides nautical charts, many hydrographic offices publish a body of books and periodicals that are collectively known as nautical publications. The most important of these are:

- Sailing Directions (or pilots): detailed descriptions of areas of the sea, shipping routes, harbours, aids to navigation, regulations etc.
- lists of lights: descriptions of lighthouses and lightbouys
- tide tables and tidal stream atlases
- ephemerides and nautical almanacs for celestial navigation
- Notice to Mariners: periodical (often weekly) updates and corrections for nautical charts and publications

Hydrographic organizations may also be involved in services such as:

- pilotage
- search and rescue
- maintenance of lighthouses and other aids to navigation
- ice breaking
- weather observation and information
- sea traffic information and surveillance
- maritime research
- regulatory affairs of ship safety

== History ==
In the development of hydrographic services, shipping organizations played a part, but the major players were the naval powers. Recognizing hydrographic information was a military advantage these naval organizations, usually under the direction of a "Hydrographer," utilized the expertise of naval officers in collecting hydrographic data that was incorporated into the navy's collection. In order to distribute the processed information (charts, directions, notices, and such) these organizations often developed specialized printing capabilities.

== Hydrographic organisations of some countries ==
=== Australia ===
Hydrographic tasks in Australian waters were performed by the United Kingdom's Royal Navy since the 19th century. In 1920 the Australian Hydrographic Service was formed as a part of the Royal Australian Navy.

=== Brazil ===
Hydrographic tasks in Brazilian waters were performed by the Directorate of Hydrography and Navigation (DHN) since 02/02/1876.

=== Canada ===
Starting in 1883, the "Georgian Bay Survey" was responsible for hydrographic surveying of Georgian Bay and Lake Huron. Its geographic area of responsibility increased and in 1904 the name was changed to the "Hydrographic Survey of Canada." The current name Canadian Hydrographic Service (CHS) was adopted in 1928.

In 1951, Canada became a State Member of the International Hydrographic Organization (IHO) and the Dominion Hydrographer is Canada's representative.

Today, the mandate of CHS is found in the Canada Oceans Act, the Canada Shipping Act (Charts and Publications Regulations) and the Navigable Waters Protection Act.

With its headquarters office located in Ottawa, Ontario there are regional offices in Sidney (British Columbia), Burlington (Ontario), Mont-Joli (Quebec), Halifax (Nova Scotia), and a branch office in St. John's Newfoundland. CHS has 300 staff across the country.

The national chart folio consists of 935 paper charts, 1,736 S-57 vector Electronic Navigation Charts and 240 raster charts in the BSB format. CHS produces and maintains seven volumes of Tides and Water Levels books, 25 Sailing Directions books, and prints and distributes a number of publications such as the Annual Notices to Mariners and Radio Aids to Marine Navigation.

In addition to significant hydrographic data holdings (single & multibeam), CHS operates 78 permanent water level stations, a real time water level and forecast system in the St. Lawrence River, and participates in the operation of Atlantic & Pacific tsunami warning systems.

CHS is directly responsible for the sales and distribution of all its products, in paper and digital form. A network of 850 dealers (domestic and international) distributes CHS paper and digital products. Products and data are also made available to Value Added Resellers, under licence.

=== Chile ===
Since 1874, the Navy's Hydrographic and Oceanographic Service ("SHOA", as acronym of"Servicio Hidrográfico y Oceanográfico de la Armada") has been the Chilean official authority on drawing and publishing nautical charts of the South Pacific Ocean for Military and Civil navigation. This institution is also the main authority on controlling the official hour of the country.

=== Denmark ===
In Denmark (including Greenland and the Faroe Islands), hydrographic surveying and charting is conducted by "Geodatastyrelsen" also known as, Danish Geodata Agency, a division of the Danish Ministry of Climate, Energy and Utilities.

=== France ===
In France, the first official organization, the French Dépôt des Cartes, Plans, Journaux et Mémoires Relatifs à la Navigation, was formed in 1720.

Today, the SHOM is the official French hydrographic office, it stands for 'Service Hydrographique et Océanographique de la Marine' and means Naval Hydrographic and Oceanographic Service.

=== Germany ===
The "Bundesamt für Seeschiffahrt und Hydrographie" (BSH) is the German federal hydrographic office. Its offices are located in Hamburg and Rostock. The BSH is responsible for a wide variety of services, among them hydrographic surveys, nautical publications, ship registration, testing and approval of technical equipment, oceanographic research, development of nautical information systems, and maritime pollution surveillance. The BSH runs six ships for survey and research purposes.

In 1945 the tasks of various predecessor organisations (among them the German Navy's hydrographic service, the Wilhelmshaven maritime observatory, and the German Maritime Observatory (Deutsche Seewarte) under Georg von Neumayer) were concentrated in the newly created "Deutsches Hydrographisches Institut" (DHI) in Hamburg. In 1990 the DHI and the corresponding East German organisation, the "Seehydrographische Dienst der DDR" in Rostock were integrated to form the BSH in its present form.

=== Greece ===
The Hellenic Navy Hydrographic Service (HNHS, Greek: Υδρογραφική Υπηρεσία Πολεμικού Ναυτικού), an independent service of the Hellenic Navy General Staff, is responsible for hydrographic surveying and production and sale of charts. The first naval hydrographic office was created in 1905 and its first mission was the hydrographic survey of Maliakos Gulf. Its first nautical chart was issued in 1909 and in 1919 the Hellenic Navy became a founding member of the International Hydrographic Organization (IHO). The hydrographic office evolved into the independent naval Hydrographic Service in 1921. Today the HNHS operates three naval hydrographic vessels: HS OS Nautilos (A-478), HS OS Pytheas (A-474) and HS Stravon (A-476).

=== Hong Kong ===
The Hong Kong Hydrographic Office is responsible for hydrographic surveying and production of nautical charts covering the waters of Hong Kong. It also produced electronic navigational charts and made available the prediction of tidal stream digitally on the internet.

=== Iceland ===
The Hydrographic & Maritime Safety Department of the Icelandic Coast Guard is responsible for hydrographic surveying and publication of nautical charts of Icelandic waters, as well of other nautical publications.

=== India ===
The Indian Naval Hydro-graphic Department (INHD) headed by Chief Hydrographer to the Government of India is an Indian Government agency responsible for hydro-graphic surveys and nautical charting in India.

=== New Zealand ===
Land Information New Zealand (LINZ) is responsible for hydrographic surveying, production of nautical charts, and provision of tidal information covering the waters of New Zealand through the New Zealand Hydrographic Authority (NZHA). Nautical charts can no longer be purchased directly from LINZ but must be purchased from Bluestar Group or from an authorised agent.

=== Norway ===
The Norwegian Hydrographic Service is responsible for hydrographic surveying and production of nautical charts covering the waters of Norway. Also operates the Primar ENC Service.

=== Ireland ===
Ireland is actively undertaking the largest civilian seabed mapping programme in the world, as a joint venture by the Marine Institute and the Geological Survey of Ireland. Total mapping coverage of the INSS to end of 2005 was 432,000 km^{2} and taken along with an earlier DCENR Petroleum Affairs Division, over 81% of the Irish designated seabed area (at end 2005) has been mapped. The INtegrated Mapping FOr the Sustainable Development of Ireland's MArine Resource (INFOMAR) programme is a successor to the Irish National Seabed Survey (INSS) and concentrates on creating a range of integrated mapping products of the physical, chemical and biological features of the seabed in the near-shore area. The programme is being funded by the Irish Government through the Department of Communications, Energy and Natural Resources as part of the National Development Plan, 2007 – 2013 [11]. Data are passed on to the United Kingdom Hydrographic Office (UKHO) for subsequent production of nautical charts.

=== Sweden ===
"Sjöfartsverket", Swedish Maritime Administration, includes the Swedish national hydrographic organisation. Established in 1956 and governed by the Ministry of Industry, Employment and Communications, Sjöfartsverket is responsible for most aspects of safe navigation in Sweden. This includes maintenance and marking of fairways, surveying and charting Swedish waters, pilotage, search-and-rescue (in cooperation with other organisations), ice-breaking, and safety inspections.

=== United Kingdom ===
The office of Hydrographer was created in 1795. Royal Navy charts and the related surveys were reputedly officially started as a result of the loss of Admiral Sir Cloudesley Shovell on an uncharted reef off the Scilly Isles which happened in October 1707 (see main article Scilly naval disaster of 1707).

The United Kingdom Hydrographic Office (UKHO) is now a part of the Ministry of Defence rather than a naval department and is located in Taunton, Somerset, near Creechbarrow hill. It is best known for producing the well-known Admiralty chart series of nautical charts that covers almost every navigable stretch of water on Earth. The UKHO also calculates tide tables for the UK.

In contrast to the US government, all of whose creative work is placed into the public domain, British government policy requires agencies such as the UKHO and the Ordnance Survey to be self-funding through the sale of the information they create. The Hydrographic Office therefore actively protects the copyright of all of its data including paper charts, electronic charts, tidal data and other data and has been known to take measures to ensure that its copyrighted information is used appropriately.

In 2013 the UKHO added an important new service for users of its paper charts by allowing its authorized agents to Print on Demand most paper charts.

UKHO attracted worldwide attention in February 2005 when it published in-depth pictures of the ocean floor in the vicinity of the Indian Ocean tsunami disaster of 26 December 2004.

=== United States ===
In the United States, the Survey of the Coast (America's first scientific agency) was established through an 1807 Congressional resolution and signed into law by President Jefferson. It subsequently became the United States Coast Survey in 1836 and the United States Coast and Geodetic Survey in 1878, and in May 1917 incorporated a new uniformed service of the United States, the Coast and Geodetic Survey Corps so that surveyors had a status as commissioned officers could not be shot as spies if captured during time of war. The U.S. Coast and Geodetic Survey was abolished and its responsibilities, personnel, facilities, and fleet incorporated into the new National Oceanic and Atmospheric Administration (NOAA) when NOAA was established in 1970. As the successor to the Coast and Geodetic Survey, NOAA's Office of Coast Survey is the national hydrographic office of the United States.

Non-domestic hydrographic and bathymetric surveys are conducted by the United States Navy′s Naval Oceanographic Office, which started with the establishment of the Depot of Charts and Instruments in 1830, which by 1854 was designated the United States Naval Observatory and Hydrographical Office. The hydrographic portion became the United States Hydrographic Office under the Hydrographer of the Navy, appointed from among uniformed U.S. Navy personnel from 1870 through 1961. With the popularization of oceanography in the early 1960s (partly due to President John F. Kennedy's interest), the name was changed to the U.S. Naval Oceanographic Office in 1962. That office, as a matter of historical and semantic interest, and the United States Naval Observatory are still part of the command overseen by the Oceanographer of the Navy, who replaced the Hydrographer of the Navy, with headquarters at the Naval Observatory in Washington, D.C. In 2001, the position of Hydrographer of the Navy was re-established.

=== Uruguay ===
Hydrographic tasks in Uruguayan waters have been performed by the SOHMA since 1916.

== See also ==
- Matthew Fontaine Maury
- George W. Littlehales
