= Hydrography =

Measurement of bodies of water

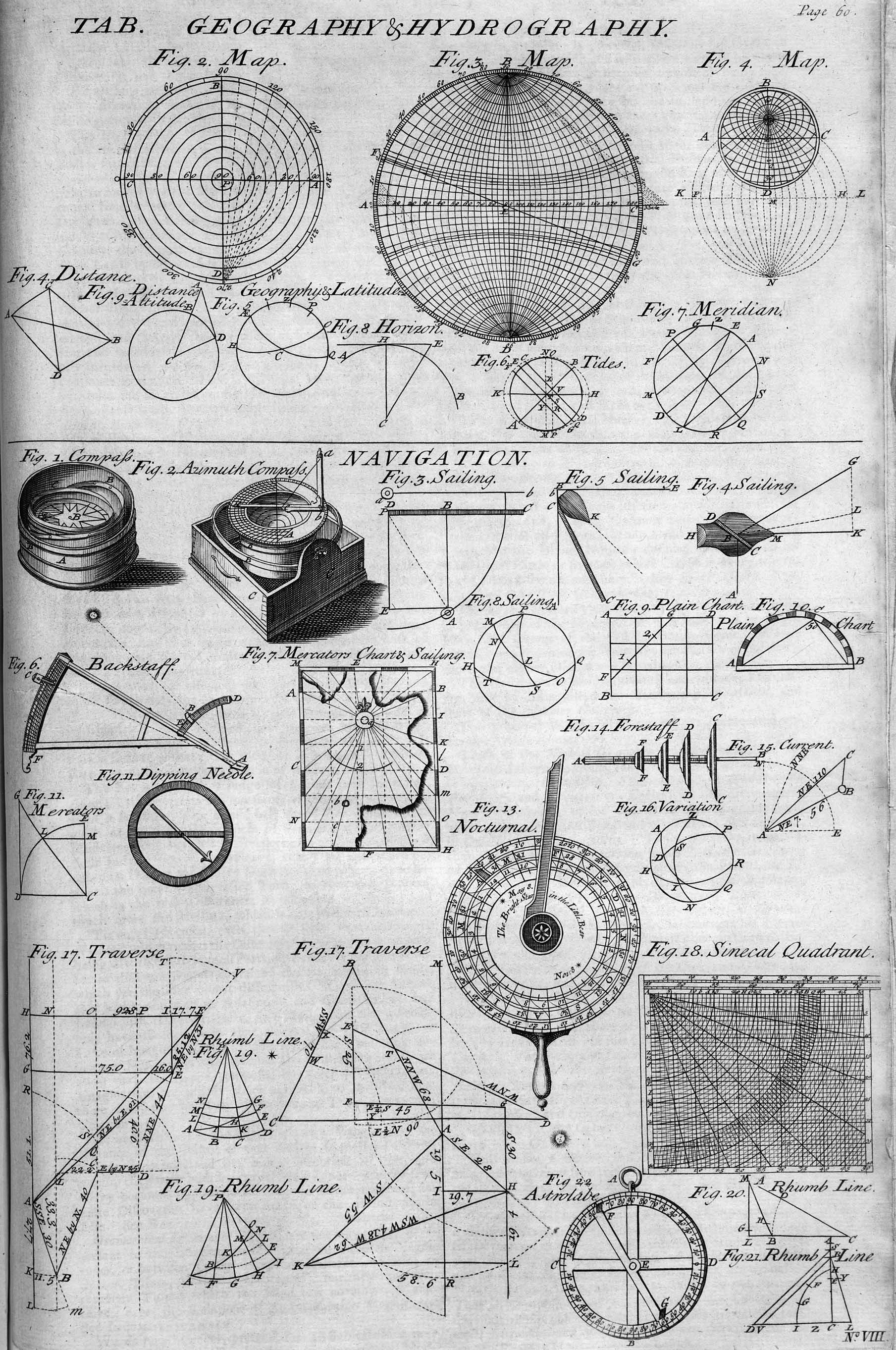
Table of geography, hydrography, and navigation, from a 1728 Cyclopaedia

Hydrography is the branch of applied sciences which deals with the measurement and description of the physical features of oceans, seas, coastal areas, lakes and rivers, as well as with the prediction of their change over time, for the primary purpose of safety of navigation and in support of all other marine activities, including economic development, security and defense, scientific research, and environmental protection.

== History ==
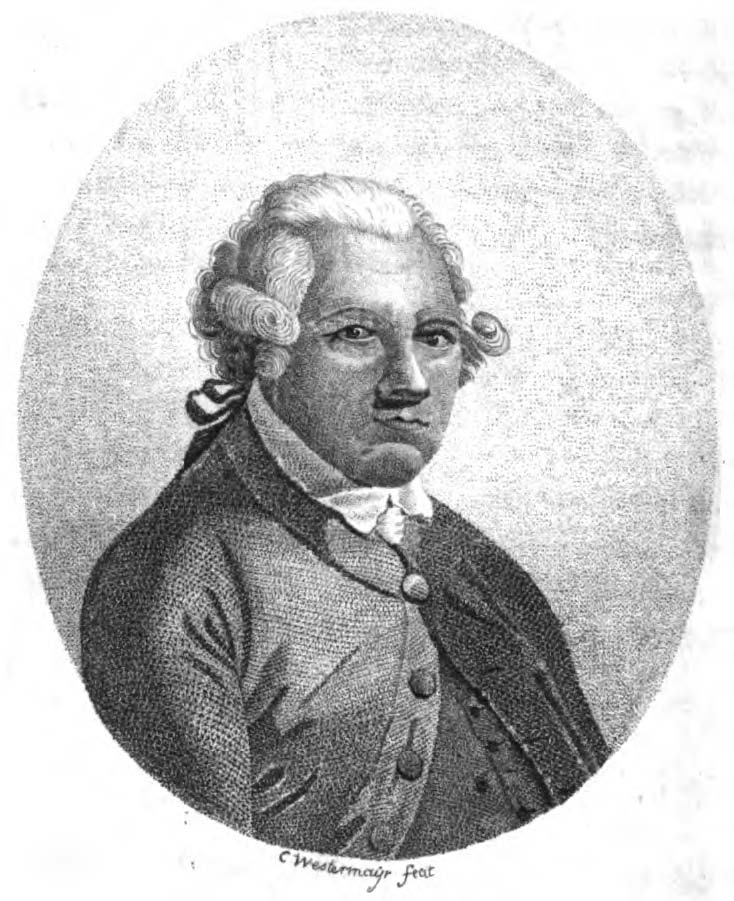
Alexander Dalrymple, the first Hydrographer of the Navy in the United Kingdom, appointed in 1795

The origins of hydrography lay in the making of charts to aid navigation, by individual mariners as they navigated into new waters. These were usually the private property, even closely held secrets, of individuals who used them for commercial or military advantage. As transoceanic trade and exploration increased, hydrographic surveys started to be carried out as an exercise in their own right, and the commissioning of surveys was increasingly done by governments and special hydrographic offices. National organizations, particularly navies, realized that the collection, systematization and distribution of this knowledge gave it great organizational and military advantages. Thus were born dedicated national hydrographic organizations for the collection, organization, publication and distribution of hydrography incorporated into charts and sailing directions.

Prior to the establishment of the United Kingdom Hydrographic Office, Royal Navy captains were responsible for the provision of their own charts. In practice this meant that ships often sailed with inadequate information for safe navigation, and that when new areas were surveyed, the data rarely reached all those who needed it. The Admiralty appointed Alexander Dalrymple as Hydrographer in 1795, with a remit to gather and distribute charts to HM Ships. Within a year existing charts from the previous two centuries had been collated, and the first catalog published. The first chart produced under the direction of the Admiralty, was a chart of Quiberon Bay in Brittany, and it appeared in 1800.

Under Captain Thomas Hurd the department received its first professional guidelines, and the first catalogs were published and made available to the public and to other nations as well. In 1829, Rear-Admiral Sir Francis Beaufort, as Hydrographer, developed the eponymous Scale, and introduced the first official tide tables in 1833 and the first "Notices to Mariners" in 1834. The Hydrographic Office underwent steady expansion throughout the 19th century; by 1855, the Chart Catalogue listed 1,981 charts giving a definitive coverage over the entire world, and produced over 130,000 charts annually, of which about half were sold.

The word hydrography comes from the Ancient Greek ὕδωρ (hydor), "water" and γράφω (graphō), "to write".

== Overview ==
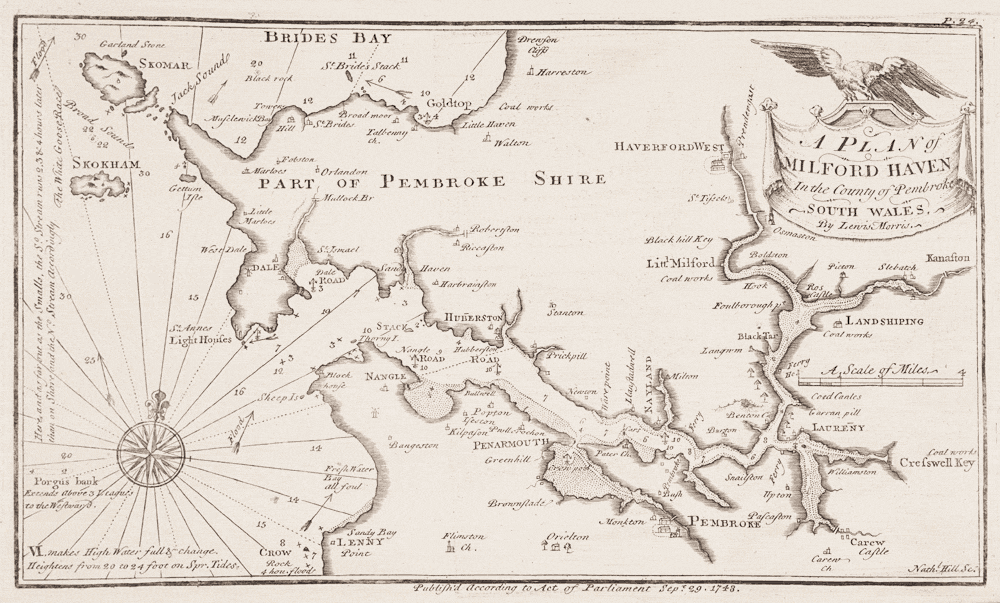
Survey of the strategic port of Milford Haven produced by Lewis Morris in 1748

Large-scale hydrography is usually undertaken by national or international organizations which sponsor data collection through precise surveys and publish charts and descriptive material for navigational purposes. The science of oceanography is, in part, an outgrowth of classical hydrography. In many respects the data are interchangeable, but marine hydrographic data will be particularly directed toward marine navigation and safety of that navigation. Marine resource exploration and exploitation is a significant application of hydrography, principally focused on the search for hydrocarbons.

Hydrographical measurements include the tidal, current and wave information of physical oceanography. They include bottom measurements, with particular emphasis on those marine geographical features that pose a hazard to navigation such as rocks, shoals, reefs and other features that obstruct ship passage. Bottom measurements also include collection of the nature of the bottom as it pertains to effective anchoring. Unlike oceanography, hydrography will include shore features, natural and manmade, that aid in navigation. Therefore, a hydrographic survey may include the accurate positions and representations of hills, mountains and even lights and towers that will aid in fixing a ship's position, as well as the physical aspects of the sea and seabed.

Hydrography, mostly for reasons of safety, adopted a number of conventions that have affected its portrayal of the data on nautical charts. For example, hydrographic charts are designed to portray what is safe for navigation, and therefore will usually tend to maintain least depths and occasionally de-emphasize the actual submarine topography that would be portrayed on bathymetric charts. The former are the mariner's tools to avoid accident. The latter are best representations of the actual seabed, as in a topographic map, for scientific and other purposes. Trends in hydrographic practice since c. 2003–2005 have led to a narrowing of this difference, with many more hydrographic offices maintaining "best observed" databases, and then making navigationally "safe" products as required. This has been coupled with a preference for multi-use surveys, so that the same data collected for nautical charting purposes can also be used for bathymetric portrayal.

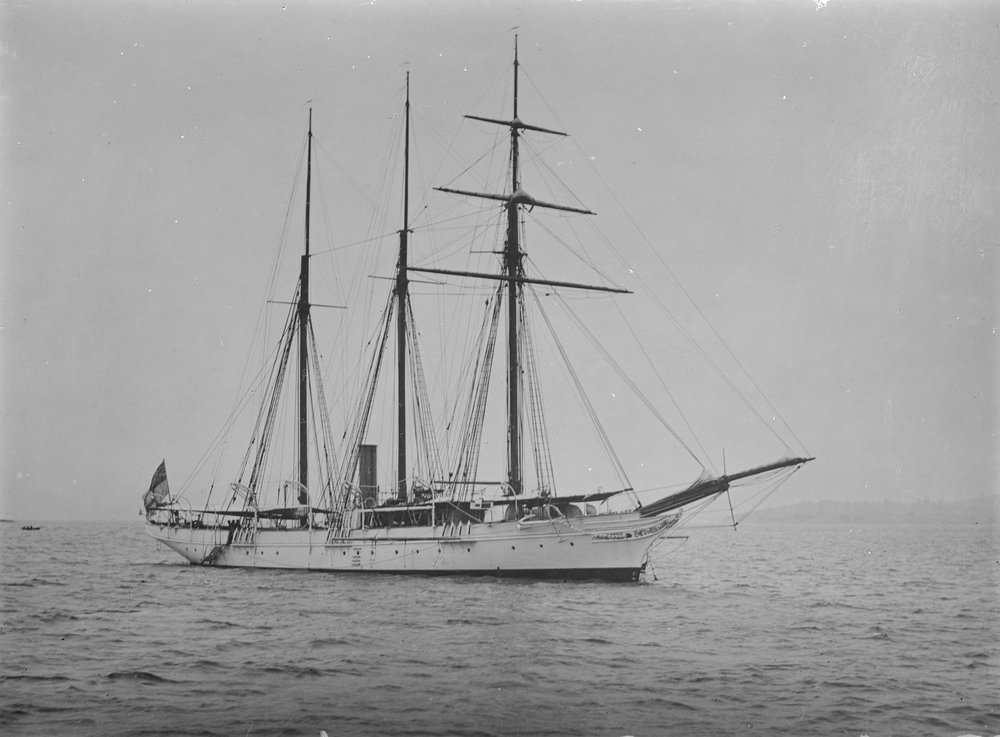
HMS Waterwitch, a hydrographic survey vessel

Even though, in places, hydrographic survey data may be collected in sufficient detail to portray bottom topography in some areas, hydrographic charts only show depth information relevant for safe navigation and should not be considered as a product that accurately portrays the actual shape of the bottom. The soundings selected from the raw source depth data for placement on the nautical chart are selected for safe navigation and are biased to show predominantly the shallowest depths that relate to safe navigation. For instance, if there is a deep area that can not be reached because it is surrounded by shallow water, the deep area may not be shown. The color filled areas that show different ranges of shallow water are not the equivalent of contours on a topographic map since they are often drawn seaward of the actual shallowest depth portrayed. A bathymetric chart does show marine topology accurately. Details covering the above limitations can be found in Part 1 of Bowditch's American Practical Navigator. Another concept that affects safe navigation is the sparsity of detailed depth data from high resolution sonar systems. In more remote areas, the only available depth information has been collected with lead lines. This collection method drops a weighted line to the bottom at intervals and records the depth, often from a rowboat or sail boat. There is no data between soundings or between sounding lines to guarantee that there is not a hazard such as a wreck or a coral head waiting there to ruin a sailor's day. Often, the navigation of the collecting boat does not match today's GPS navigational accuracies. The hydrographic chart will use the best data available and will caveat its nature in a caution note or in the legend of the chart.

A hydrographic survey is quite different from a bathymetric survey in some important respects, particularly in a bias toward least depths due to the safety requirements of the former and geomorphologic descriptive requirements of the latter. Historically, this could include echosoundings being conducted under settings biased toward least depths, but in modern practice hydrographic surveys typically attempt to best measure the depths observed, with the adjustments for navigational safety being applied after the fact.

Hydrography of streams will include information on the stream bed, flows, water quality and surrounding land. Basin or interior hydrography pays special attention to rivers and potable water although if collected data is not for ship navigational uses, and is intended for scientific usage, it is more commonly called hydrometry or hydrology.

Hydrography of rivers and streams is also an integral part of water management. Most reservoirs in the United States use dedicated stream gauging and rating tables to determine inflows into the reservoir and outflows to irrigation districts, water municipalities and other users of captured water. River/stream hydrographers use handheld and bank mounted devices, to capture a sectional flow rate of moving water through a section and or current.

=== Equipment ===
Uncrewed Surface Vessels (USVs) and are commonly used for hydrographic surveys - they are often equipped with some sort of sonar. Single-beam echosounders, multibeam echosounders, and side scan sonars are all frequently used in hydrographic applications. The knowledge gained from these surveys aids in disaster planning, port and harbor maintenance, and various other coastal planning activities.

== Organizations ==
Hydrographic services in most countries are carried out by specialized hydrographic offices. The international coordination of hydrographic efforts lies with the International Hydrographic Organization.

The United Kingdom Hydrographic Office is one of the oldest, supplying a wide range of charts covering the globe to other countries, allied military organizations and the public.

In the United States, the hydrographic charting function has been carried out since 1807 by the Office of Coast Survey of the National Oceanic and Atmospheric Administration within the U.S. Department of Commerce and the U.S. Army Corps of Engineers.

== See also ==
- Bathymetric chart – Map depicting the submerged terrain of bodies of water
- Coastal geography – Study of the region between the ocean and the land
- Challenger expedition – Oceanographic research expedition (1872–1876)
- Hydrology – Science of the movement, distribution, and quality of water on Earth
- Hydrometry – Monitoring the components of the hydrological cycle
- World Hydrography Day – Publicate the importance of hydrographer

Associations focussing on ocean hydrography

- International Federation of Hydrographic Societies (formerly The Hydrographic Society)
- State Hydrography Service of Georgia
- The Hydrographic Society of America
- Australasian Hydrographic Society

Associations focussing on river stream and lake hydrography

- Australian Hydrographic Association
- New Zealand Hydrological Society
- American Institute of Hydrology
