= Coast Survey =

Coast Survey may refer to:

- Office of Coast Survey, an element of the National Oceanic and Atmospheric Administration established in 1970
- United States Coast and Geodetic Survey, a U.S. Government scientific agency of 1807–1970, known as the Survey of the Coast from 1807 to 1836 and as the United States Coast Survey from 1836 to 1878
- National Ocean Service, an office of the National Oceanic and Atmospheric Administration established in 1970 and known as the National Ocean Survey until 1983

== See also ==
- Hydrographic survey
- National Geodetic Survey
- United States Geological Survey
