= Office of Coast Survey =

Chartmaker of the United States of America

The Office of Coast Survey is the official chartmaker of the United States. It is an element of the National Ocean Service in the National Oceanic and Atmospheric Administration, which is part of the United States Department of Commerce.

== Mission ==
Responsible for updating nautical charts, surveying the seafloor, responding to maritime emergencies, and searching for underwater obstructions that pose a danger to navigation, the Office of Coast Survey provides the United States with navigation products and information for improving commerce and security and for protecting coastal environments. Among other products and services the office produces U.S. nautical charts. and the United States Coast Pilot.

The Office of Coast Survey is responsible for preparing and maintaining over a thousand nautical charts covering the exclusive economic zone off the coast of the United States and its territories, extending 200 nautical miles (370 km; 230 mi) offshore and covering a total area of 3,400,000 square nautical miles (12,000,000 km^{2}; 4,500,000 sq mi). It also develops hydrodynamic models for coastal management.

== Organization ==
The Office of Coast Survey employs about 250 United States Government employees and about 50 contractor personnel. It is organized into four components:

- The Marine Chart Division, responsible for processing nautical data, producing raster, paper, and electronic charts, and making critical corrections to charts.
- The Hydrographic Survey Division, which conducts hydrographic surveys, acquires data, and maintains Atlantic and Pacific hydrographic branches
- The Navigation Services Division, which produces the United States Coast Pilot and handles customer affairs and responses to navigation issues.
- The Coast Survey Development Laboratory, which develops hydrographic systems and technology and cartographic and geospatial technology operates a marine modeling and analysis branch.

== History ==
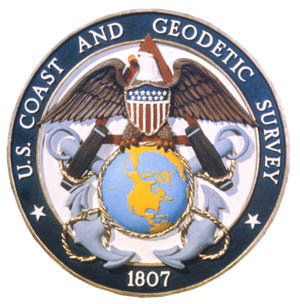
The seal of the United States Coast and Geodetic Survey, the ancestor agency of the Office of Coast Survey.

=== Beginnings ===
United States Government chartmaking began in 1807, when President Thomas Jefferson signed a document entitled "An act to provide for surveying the coasts of the United States," which created the U.S. Government's first scientific agency, the Survey of the Coast. While the bill's specific objective was to produce nautical charts, it reflected larger issues of concern to the United States, namely national boundaries, commerce, and defense.

The early years were difficult. Ferdinand Rudolph Hassler, who was eventually to become the agency's first superintendent, went to England to collect scientific instruments but was unable to return until after the War of 1812 (1812–1815). After his return, he worked on a survey of New York Harbor in 1817, but the United States Congress stepped in to suspend the work because of tensions between civilian and military control of the agency. After several years of inactivity under the control of the United States Army, the Survey of the Coast was reestablished in 1832, and President Andrew Jackson appointed Hassler as superintendent. It was renamed the United States Coast Survey in 1836.

The U.S. Coast Survey was a civilian agency but, from the beginning, members of the U.S. Navy and U.S. Army were detailed to service with the Survey, and ships of the U.S. Navy and United States Revenue-Marine (renamed the United States Revenue Cutter Service in 1894) were also detailed to its use. In general, Army officers worked on topographic surveys on the land and maps based on the surveys, while Navy officers worked on hydrographic surveys in coastal waters.

=== Civil War ===
Alexander Dallas Bache, great-grandson of Benjamin Franklin, was the second U.S. Coast Survey superintendent. Bache was a physicist, scientist, and surveyor who established the first magnetic observatory and served as the first president of the National Academy of Sciences. Under Bache, the Coast Survey quickly applied its resources to the Union cause during the American Civil War (1861–1865). In addition to setting up additional lithographic presses to produce the thousands of charts required by U.S. Navy ships and other vessels, Bache made a critical decision to send Coast Survey parties to work with U.S. Navy blockading squadrons and Union Army formations in the field, producing hundreds of maps and charts. Bache detailed these activities in his annual reports to the U.S. Congress. Maps were of paramount importance in wartime:

It is certain that accurate maps must form the basis of well-conducted military operations, and that the best time to procure them is not when an attack is impending, or when the army waits, but when there is no hindrance to, or pressure upon, the surveyors. That no coast can be effectively attacked, defended, or blockaded without accurate maps and charts, has been fully proved by the events of the last two years, if, indeed, such a proposition required practical proof.

— Alexander Dallas Bache, 1862 report

Bache was also one of four members of the government's Blockade Strategy Board, planning strategy to essentially strangle the Confederate States of America economically and militarily. On April 16, 1861, President Abraham Lincoln issued a proclamation declaring the Union blockade of ports from South Carolina to Texas. Bache's Notes on the Coast provided valuable information for Union naval forces.

In 1861, Coast Survey cartographer Edwin Hergesheimer created a map showing the density of the slave population in the Southern United States.

=== After the Civil War ===
After the conclusion of the American Civil War, the Coast Survey attracted some of the best and brightest scientists and naturalists. It commissioned the naturalist Louis Agassiz to conduct the first scientific study of the Florida reef system. James McNeill Whistler, who went on to paint the iconic Whistler's Mother, was a Coast Survey engraver. The naturalist John Muir was a guide and artist on a survey of the 39th parallel across the Great Basin of Nevada and Utah.

The agency was renamed the United States Coast and Geodetic Survey in 1878. Its men and women (women professionals were hired as early as 1845) led scientific and engineering activities through the decades. They supported the U.S. war effort during the Spanish American War (1898) and World War I (1917–1918). In 1926, they started production of aeronautical charts. During the height of the Great Depression in the 1930s, the Coast and Geodetic Survey organized surveying parties and field offices that employed over 10,000 people, including many out-of-work engineers.

In World War II, the Coast and Geodetic Survey sent over 1,000 civilian members and more than half of its commissioned officers to serve as hydrographers, artillery surveyors, cartographers, U.S. Army engineers, intelligence officers, and geophysicists in all theaters of the war. Coast and Geodetic Survey civilians on the home front produced over 100 million maps and charts for the Allied Forces. Eleven members of the Survey were killed during the war.

=== Recent history ===
On October 3, 1970, the Coast and Geodetic Survey was dissolved as it merged with other U.S. government agencies to form the new National Oceanic and Atmospheric Administration. As the Coast and Geodetic Survey's successor agency within NOAA, the National Ocean Survey (officially established on October 9, 1970, and renamed the National Ocean Service in 1983) took over its missions, assets, personnel, and facilities. Within the National Ocean Survey, the new Office of Coast Survey received the chartmaking responsibilities formerly assigned to the Coast and Geodetic Survey.

== See also ==
- Australian Hydrographic Service
