= The Planet of Doubt =

- Short story by Stanley G. Weinbaum
- Country: United States
- Language: English
- Genre: Science fiction

Publication
- Published in: Astounding Stories
- Publication type: Periodical
- Publisher: Street & Smith
- Media type: Print (Magazine)
- Publication date: October 1935

Chronology
- Series: Ham Hammond
The Lotus Eaters	—

"The Planet of Doubt" is a science fiction short story by American writer Stanley G. Weinbaum that was first published in the October 1935 issue of Astounding Stories. It is Weinbaum's third story featuring Hamilton Hammond and Patricia Burlingame, a sequel to "Parasite Planet" and "The Lotus Eaters".

== Plot summary ==
Following his expedition to the night side of Venus, the Smithsonian Institution appoints Hamilton "Ham" Hammond to head an expedition to Uranus. In Weinbaum's version of the Solar System, all of the gas giants generate significant amounts of infrared radiation, enough to produce Earthlike environments on the inner moons of Jupiter and Saturn and on the surface of Uranus itself.

At the time "The Planet of Doubt" takes place at the turn of the 22nd century, the limited range of the spaceships ensures that Uranus can only be reached from the American base on Titan when Saturn reaches conjunction with Uranus, an event that occurs once every forty years. The Young expedition explored the planet's south pole in 2060; now Hammond takes his ship, the Gaea, to the north pole.

Finding an ocean at the north pole, Hammond sends the Gaea spiraling southeast until they reach land. They find the surface of Uranus largely barren with a few plants. The surface is shrouded in a thick fog which absorbs radio waves as well as visible light, and there is no planetary magnetic field to work a compass, so the members of the expedition, including Hammond's wife, the Venusian-born biologist Patricia Burlingame, must remain tethered to the ship to avoid getting lost.

While Hammond and Burlingame explore, she starts seeing vague shapes in the fog; Hammond begins to see them too. When they receive a signal from the ship, they hurry back to find it under attack by an immensely long black creature made up of dozens of connected segments. They manage to fight it off and return to the ship. Burlingame decides that the creature is similar to the larval Thaumetopoeidae, which forms processions when it travels from its nest. She hypothesizes that the individual segments link nervous systems so that they all act in unison. As for the shapes in the fog, Burlingame thinks they are analogous to honeyguides, and that they lead the segment-creature to its prey.

On their last foray from the ship, Burlingame sees a new type of flora beyond the reach of her tether. Against Hammond's orders, she frees herself from the tether to approach it. Hammond summons the ship's other two crew members, leaves a note for them at the end of the tether, then frees himself. He wanders lost for hours before accidentally coming across the tether again. He and the rest of the crew continue searching for forty hours before finally finding Burlingame resting within a segment-creature that has formed a closed loop. The other crew members boost Hammond over the segment-creature. He pulls a rope taut between him and them and Burlingame climbs across, then Hammond vaults over the moving segment-creature.

Back on board the Gaea, Burlingame reveals that shortly after leaving her tether, she ran into a segment-creature which began chasing her. She had the idea of running up to the last creature in the line so that the leader would latch onto it, but inadvertently left herself inside the circle instead of outside. She also deduced that the shapes in the fog were the shadows of flying creatures, and that the segment-creatures were their larvae.

== Collections ==
"The Planet of Doubt" appears in the following Stanley G. Weinbaum collections:

- A Martian Odyssey and Others (1949)
- A Martian Odyssey and Other Science Fiction Tales (1974)
- Interplanetary Odysseys (2006)
