= List of lights =

Publication describing lighthouses and other aids to maritime navigation

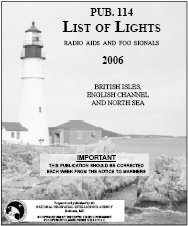
The front cover of a List of Lights volume

A list of lights is a publication describing lighthouses and other aids to maritime navigation. Most such lists are published by national hydrographic offices. Some nations, including the United Kingdom and the United States, publish lists that cover the whole world in many volumes. Other nations publish lists that cover only their own coasts.

== Canada ==
The Canadian Coast Guard publishes the List of Lights, Buoys and Fog Signals in four volumes which are updated periodically

- Newfoundland and Labrador
- Inland Waters
- Atlantic Coast
- Pacific Coast

The books are available in paper from dealers. As well, HTML and PDF formats updated up to the latest version of the Monthly Notices to Mariners can be viewed online. The PDF format is also available for free download.

== Chile ==
The Chilean official list of lighthouses is the Lista de Faros de la costa de Chile, Costa Oriental de Tierra del Fuego y Territorio Antártico published (as Nr. 3007) by the Hydrographic and Oceanographic Service of the Chilean Navy (SHOA)

Navigational aids in Chile are provided by the Servicio de Señalización Marítima [Maritime Signalling Service], a department of the Dirección de Seguridad y Operaciones Marítimas (Dirsomar) [Directorate of Maritime Security and Operations], of the Dirección General del Territorio Marítimo y de Marina Mercante (Directemar) [Directorate General of the Maritime Territory and the Merchant Marine] of the Chilean Navy.

== Denmark ==
Official light list from Denmark Dansk Fyrliste 2020 provided by Søfartsstyrelsen or in English Danish Maritime Authority

https://www.soefartsstyrelsen.dk/Media/6/0/Dansk%20Fyrliste%202020.pdf

== France ==
SHOM, the French Naval Hydrographic and Oceanographic Service, publishes Livres des feux et signaux de brume (Books of Lights and Fog Signals) in four volumes, updated periodically:

- LA - The northeast Atlantic from Gibraltar to Ireland and the southern North Sea
- LB - The Mediterranean from Gibraltar to Sicily; and Syria and Lebanon
- LC - Atlantic Islands, west coast of Africa south to the Equator; Madagascar, Mauritius, Kerguelen; French Possessions in the Pacific Ocean
- LD - Saint Pierre and Miquelon - Lesser Antilles - Guyana

== United Kingdom ==
Admiralty List of Lights & Fog Signals vol. H: Northern and Eastern Coasts of Canada

The United Kingdom Hydrographic Office, generally known as "The Admiralty", publishes the Admiralty List of Lights and Fog Signals covering the whole world in 15 volumes. The information is also available in digital form.

== United States ==
The United States Coast Guard Light List is published annually in seven volumes. It covers the entire coastline of the United States and its possessions.

- I, Atlantic Coast, St. Croix River, Maine to Shrewsbury River, New Jersey
- II, Atlantic Coast, Shrewsbury River, New Jersey to Little River, South Carolina
- III, Atlantic Coast, Little River, South Carolina to Econfina River, Florida
- IV, Gulf of Mexico
- V, Mississippi River System
- VI, Pacific Coast and Pacific Islands
- VII, Great Lakes

Each volume of the Light List contains aids to navigation in geographic order from north to south along the Atlantic coast, from east to west along the Gulf coast, and from south to north along the Pacific coast. It lists seacoast aids first, followed by entrance and harbor aids listed from seaward.

Intracoastal Waterway aids are listed last in geographic order in the direction from New Jersey to Florida to the border of Texas and Mexico.

The listings are preceded by a description of the aids to navigation system in the United States, luminous range diagram, geographic range tables, and other information.

NGA publishes NGA List of Lights Radio Aids & Fog Signals covering the rest of the world:

- PUB. 110 – Greenland, the East Coasts of North and South America (excluding Continental U.S.A. except the East Coast of Florida) and the West Indies
- PUB. 111 – The West Coasts of North and South America (Excluding Continental U.S.A. and Hawaii), Australia, Tasmania, New Zealand, and the Islands of the North and South Pacific Oceans
- PUB. 112 – Western Pacific and Indian Oceans Including the Persian Gulf and Red Sea
- PUB. 113 – The West Coasts of Europe and Africa, the Mediterranean Sea, Black Sea and Azovskoye More (Sea of Azov)
- PUB. 114 – British Isles, English Channel and North Sea
- PUB. 115 – Norway, Iceland and Arctic Ocean
- PUB. 116 – Baltic Sea with Kattegat, Belts and Sound and Gulf of Bothnia

Both the Coast Guard and the NGA lists are available in book form from a range of dealers and in PDF form, without charge.

In addition to information on lighted aids to navigation and sound signals in foreign waters, the NGA List of Lights provides information on storm signals, signal stations, racons, radiobeacons, and radio direction finder calibration stations located at or near lights. Publication number 117, Radio Navigational Aids, is the primary source for details on radio navigational aids.

The List of Lights does not include information on lighted buoys inside harbors. It does include certain aeronautical lights situated near the coast; however, these lights are not designed for marine navigation and are subject to unreported changes.

Notices to mariners provided by other countries are the main source for correctional information source for the Lists of Lights, however other sources, such as ship reports, are also used.

== See also ==
- American Practical Navigator
- Buoy
- Coast Pilots
- Local Notice to Mariners
- Notice to mariners
- Sailing Directions
