= Bowditch's American Practical Navigator =

Encyclopedia of maritime navigation

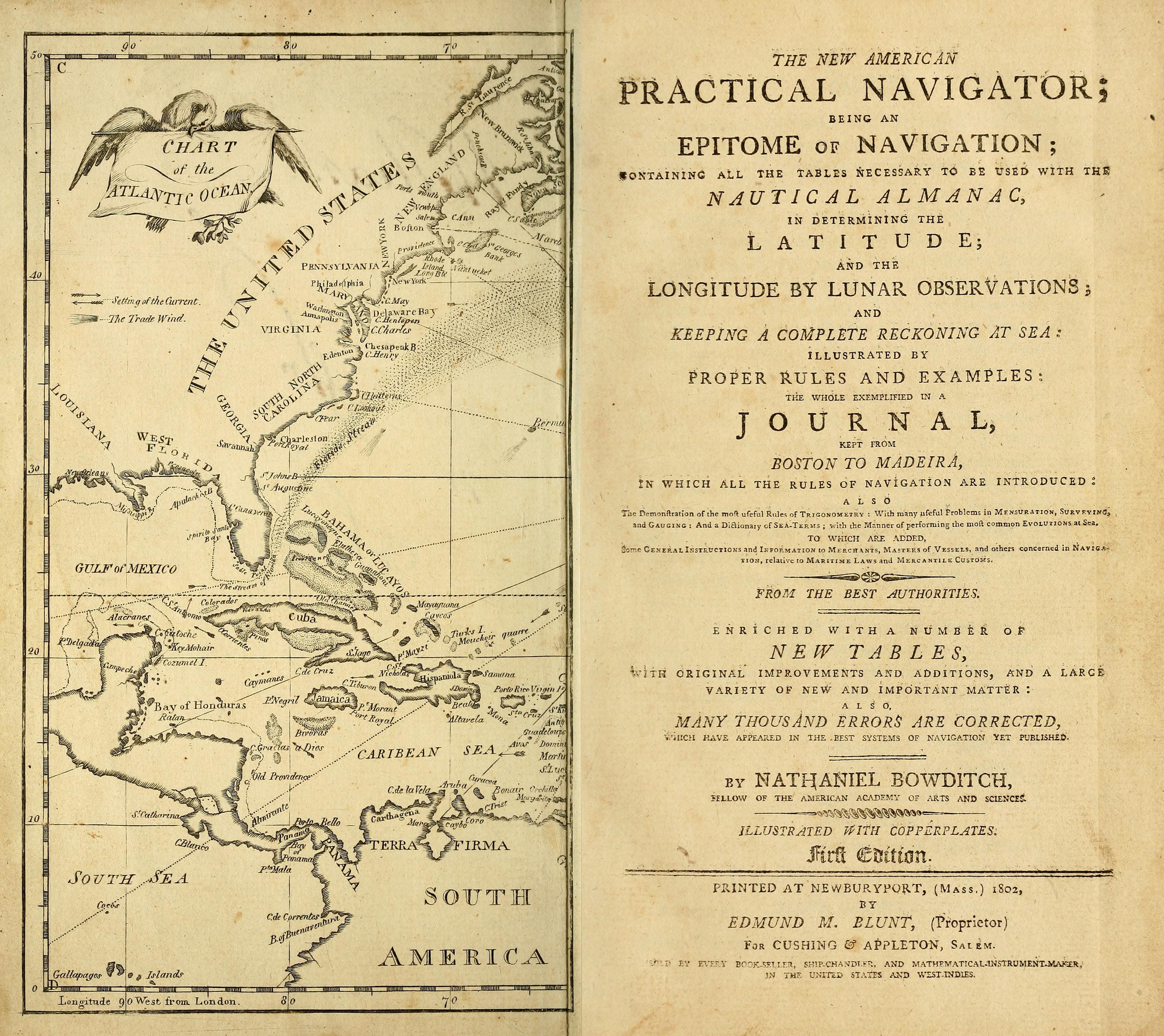
- Frontispiece of 1802 first edition
- Publisher: Defense Mapping Agency Hydrographic Topographic Center (DMAHTC)

The American Practical Navigator (colloquially often referred to as Bowditch), originally written by Nathaniel Bowditch, is an encyclopedia of navigation. It serves as a valuable handbook on oceanography and meteorology, and contains useful tables and a maritime glossary. In 1867 the copyright and plates were bought by the Hydrographic Office of the United States Navy. As of 2019 it is still published by the U.S. Government and is available free online from the National Geospatial-Intelligence Agency (NGA), the modern successor agency to the 19th Century Hydrographic Office. The publication is considered one of America's nautical institutions.

== History ==
The most popular navigational text of the late 18th century was The Practical Navigator by John Hamilton Moore of the Royal Navy, first published in 1772. To have exact tables to work from, Bowditch recomputed all of Moore's tables, and rearranged and expanded the work. He contacted the US publisher of the work, Edmund March Blunt, who asked him to correct and revise the third edition on his fifth voyage. The task was so extensive that Bowditch decided to write his own book, and to "put down in the book nothing I can't teach the crew." On that trip, it is said that every man of the crew of 12, including the ship's cook, became competent to take and calculate lunar observations and to plot the correct position of the ship. The New Practical Navigator was published in 1799, followed by a second edition in 1800.

By 1802, when Blunt was ready to publish a third edition, Nathaniel Bowditch and others had corrected so many errors in Moore's work that Blunt decided to publish it as the first edition of a new work, The New American Practical Navigator. The current edition of the American Practical Navigator traces its pedigree to that 1802 edition. Edmund M. Blunt continued to publish the book until 1833; upon his retirement, his sons, Edmund and George, assumed publication. The elder Blunt died in 1862; his son Edmund followed in 1866. The next year, 1867, George Blunt sold the copyright to the government for $25,000. The government has published Bowditch ever since. George Blunt died in 1878.

Nathaniel Bowditch continued to correct and revise the book until his death in 1838. Upon his death, the editorial responsibility for The New American Practical Navigator passed to his son, J. Ingersoll Bowditch. Very few significant changes were made under him. Editions from 1837 through 1880 are nearly identical in content. Ingersoll Bowditch continued editing the Navigator until George Blunt sold the copyright to the government. He outlived all of the principals involved in publishing and editing the Navigator, dying in 1889.

The U.S. government has published some 52 editions since acquiring the copyright to the book that has come to be known simply by its original author's name, "Bowditch". Since the government began production, the book has been known by its year of publishing, instead of by the edition number. After the first major revision, a total overhaul of the book's content completed in 1880 under the direction of Commander Philip H. Cooper, USN, the name was changed to American Practical Navigator. Much of Bowditch's original content, including his methods for clearing lunar distance observations, were dropped in 1880 (though a new method for clearing lunars remained in an appendix until the early 20th century). After numerous incremental revisions and printings in the period from 1914 to 1944, Bowditch was extensively revised between 1946 and 1958.

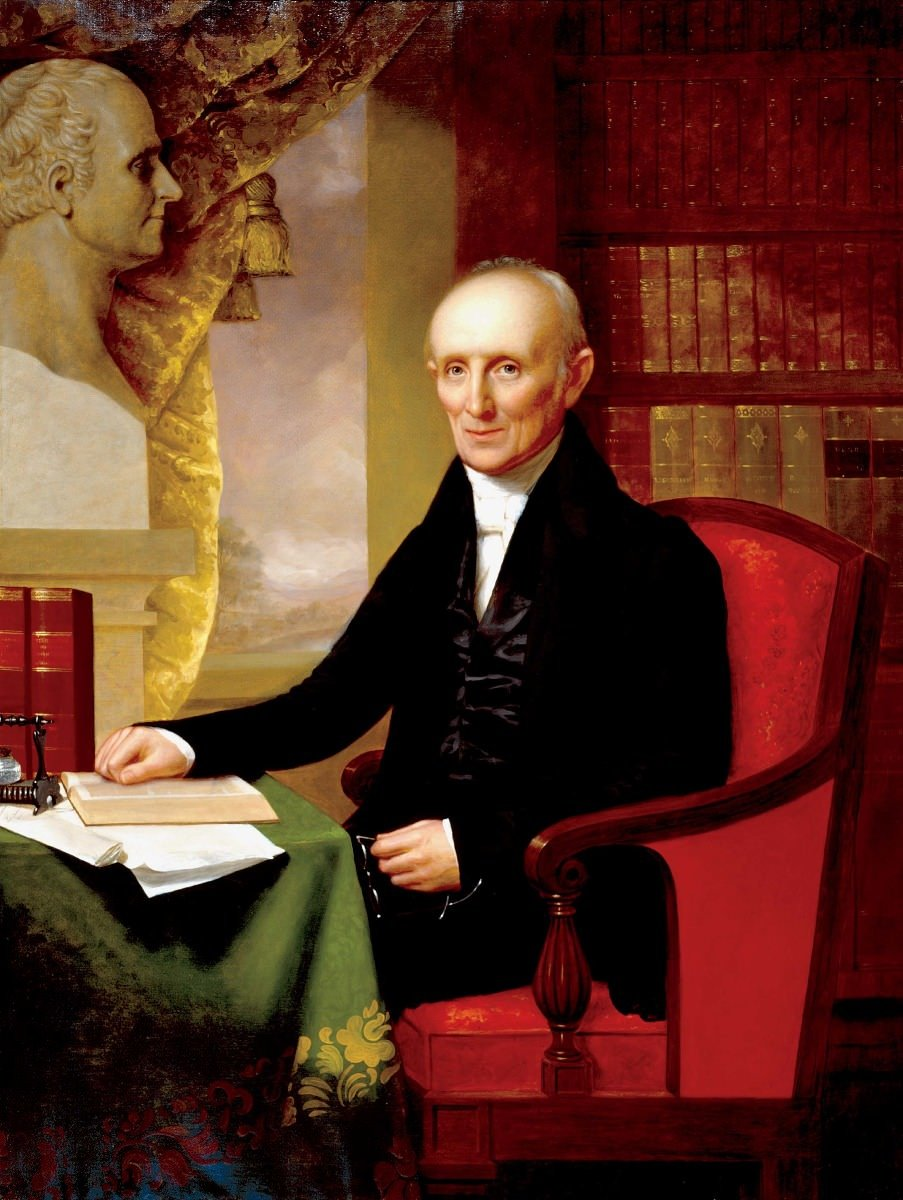
Nathaniel Bowditch

The present volume, while retaining the basic format of the 1958 version, reorganizes the subjects, deletes obsolete text, and adds new material to keep pace with the extensive changes in navigation that have taken place in the electronic age.

The 1995 edition of the American Practical Navigator incorporates extensive changes in organization, content, and format. Recent advances in navigational electronics, communications, positioning, and other technologies have transformed the way navigation is practiced at sea, and it is clear that even more changes are forthcoming. The changes to this edition of Bowditch are intended to ensure that this publication remains the premier reference work for practical marine navigation. Concerted efforts were made to return to Nathaniel Bowditch's original intention "to put down in the book nothing I can't teach the crew." To this end, many complex formulas and equations have been eliminated, and emphasis placed on the capabilities and limitations of various navigation systems and how to use them, instead of explaining complex technical and theoretical details. This edition replaces but does not cancel former editions, which may be retained and consulted as to navigation methods not discussed therein. The current edition (as of June 2017) is Edition 53, a two-volume, all-digital version released by NGA in 2017.

The Bicentennial Edition (2002) incorporated Volume 1 and Volume 2 into a single printed volume, with the goal of putting as much useful information before the navigator as possible in the most understandable and readable format, a single, hard-bound volume. While that edition saw widespread use in civilian, military and commercial fleets, it sacrificed some data on classical celestial navigation and on advances in satellite and electronic navigation to meet the compressed requirements of the physical form. Twenty years later, with a resurgence of interest in celestial navigation and the large-scale adoption of electronic navigation, NGA returned Pub. No. 9 to a two-volume format to encompass the expanded material. The NGA's latest printed edition is available in both two separate volumes but also offering a version where it incorporates both volumes into one book. The latest edition was issued in 2019 with freely downloadable PDFs available in the NGA's official website updated to June 2021.

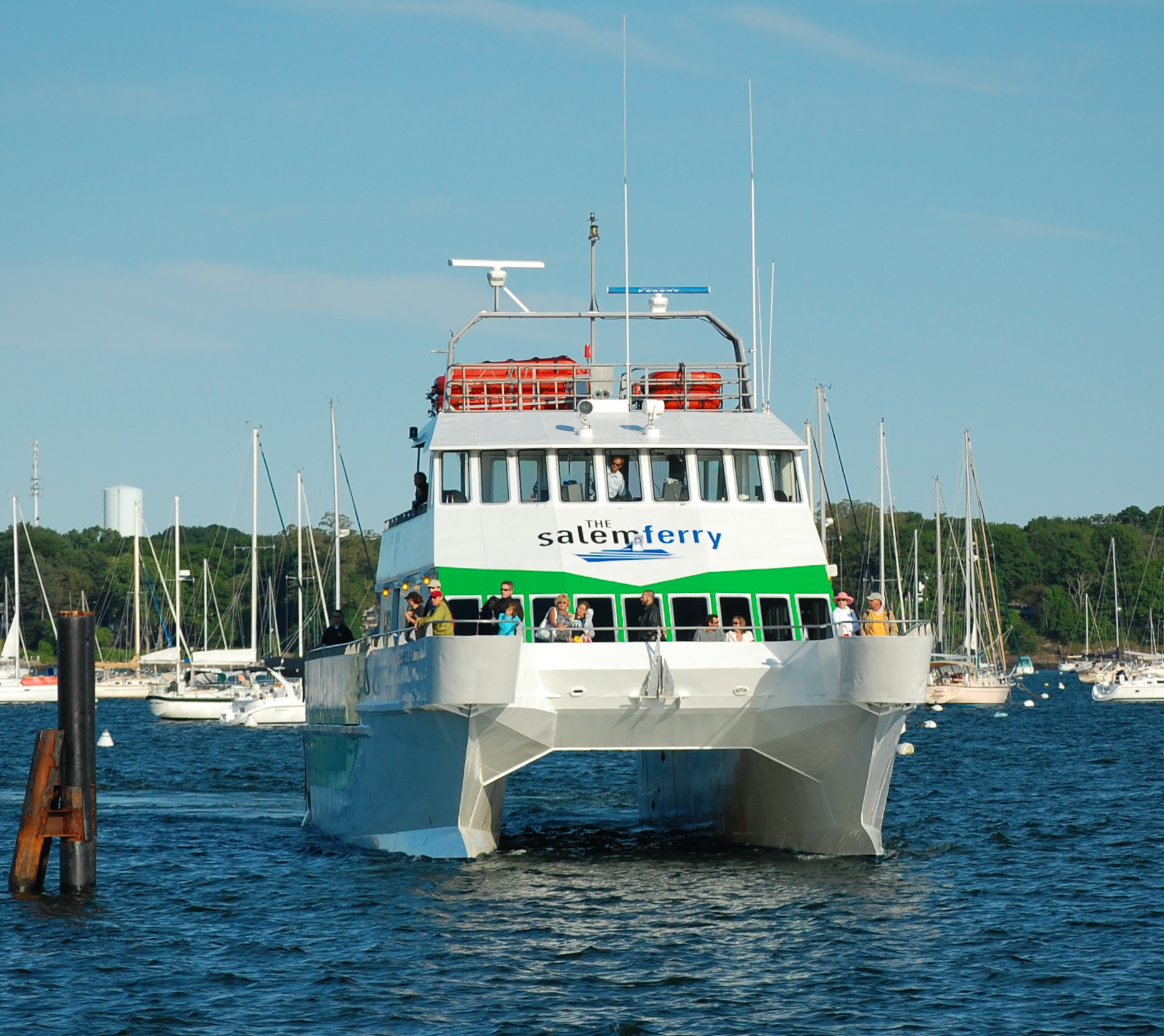
In celebration of Nathaniel Bowditch and his work writing the American Practical Navigator, in his hometown of Salem, Massachusetts there is the Salem ferry, named after Bowditch, a high speed catamaran takes people to Boston and is pictured as it is approaching its dock off Blaney Street, Salem Maritime National Historic Site.

== Contents ==
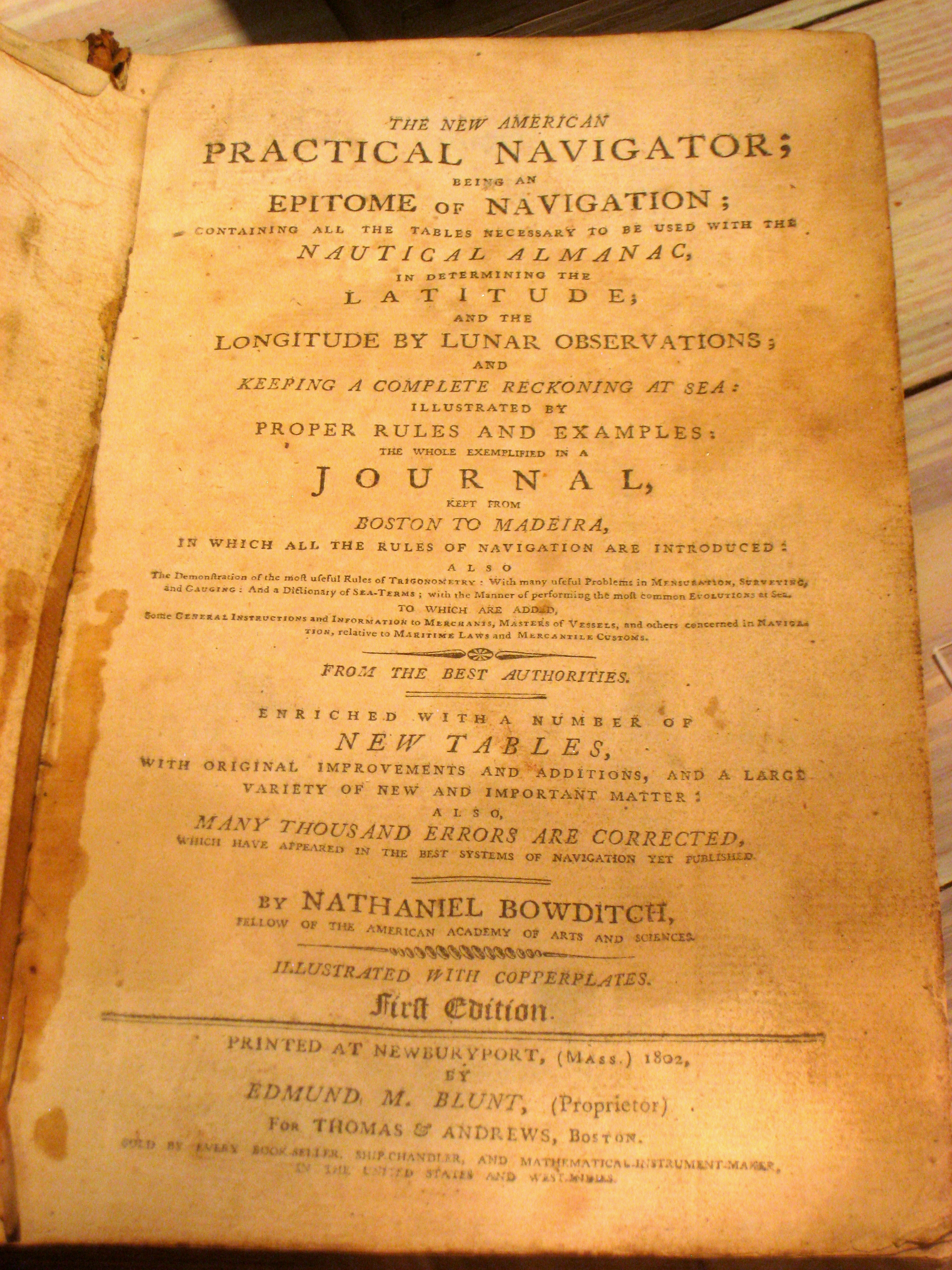
Title page, first edition

Part I
Fundamentals, includes an overview of the types and phases of marine navigation and the organizations which support and regulate it. It includes chapters relating to the structure, use and limitations of nautical charts; chart datums and their importance; and other material of a basic nature.

Part II
Piloting, emphasizes the practical aspects of navigating a vessel in restricted waters.

Part III
Electronic Navigation, covers the primary means of positioning of the modern navigator. Chapters deal with each of the several electronic methods of navigation, organized by type.

Part IV
Celestial Navigation, contains techniques, examples and problems and a chapter on sight reduction.

Part V
Navigational Mathematics, includes chapters relating to such topics as basic navigational mathematics and computer use in the solution of navigation problems.

Part VI
Navigational Safety, discusses aspects of the new distress and safety communications systems now in place or being implemented in the next several years, as well as navigation regulations, emergency navigation procedures, and distress communications.

Part VII
Oceanography, contains chapters on practical oceanography of use to the mariner.

Part VIII
Marine Meteorology, incorporates weather routing and forecasting methods as well as color plates of the Beaufort Sea States.

== Notable users and usage ==
Due to its usefulness as both a navigational tool and as a practical oceanic handbook, The American Practical Navigator was famously used by the clipper Hornet and the whaleship Essex. On the Hornet it was used to help save fourteen of the thirty-one-person manifest, after they were forced by an onboard fire to abandon ship. Crowded onto a lifeboat with a sextant and a copy of The American Practical Navigator this group of men were able to navigate their way from a thousand miles west of the Galapagos Islands to Hawaii in forty-three days. Likewise, the Essex while off the west coast of South America was attacked by a whale and its crew shipwrecked. They were fortunate enough to get into longboats with multiple compasses, quadrants, and a copy of The American Practical Navigator. As a result, they were able to navigate their way to the remote Henderson Island where they were able to find some food and water. Ultimately, many of them would die or resort to cannibalism in an attempt to reach Easter Island and a supposed rescue. The ship's captain George Pollard Jr. would later describe The American Practical Navigator as one of "the probable instruments of our salvation."

== Sources ==
Portions of this article originated from the preface of The American Practical Navigator, a document produced by the government of the United States of America.

== See also ==
- Buoy
- Carry On, Mr. Bowditch
- Coast Pilots
- Day beacon
- Daymark
- Light List
- List of lights
- Local Notice to Mariners
- Notice to Mariners
- RACON
- Sailing Directions
