= Local notice to mariners =

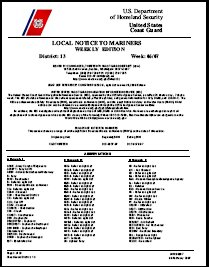
The first page of a local notice to mariners

A local notice to mariners is an authoritative instruction issued by a designated official, typically the harbormaster.

== United States ==
In the United States, notices are issued by each U.S. Coast Guard district to disseminate important information affecting navigational safety within that district. This notice reports changes and deficiencies in aids to navigation maintained by the Coast Guard. Other marine information such as new charts, channel depths, naval operations, and regattas is included. Since temporary information of short duration is not included in the weekly notice to mariners, the local notice to mariners may be the only source of such information. Small craft using the Intracoastal Waterway and small harbors not normally used by oceangoing vessels need it to keep charts and publications up-to-date.

Since correcting information for U.S. charts in the notice to mariners is obtained from the Coast Guard local notices, it is normal to expect a lag of one or two weeks for the notice to mariners to publish a correction from this source.

The local notice to mariners may be obtained free of charge by contacting the appropriate Coast Guard district commander. Vessels operating in ports and waterways in several districts must obtain a local notice to mariners from each district.

=== Sources ===
The text of the US material originated from section 422 of The American Practical Navigator, a document produced by the government of the United States of America.

== Examples ==
LNTMs are, by definition, concerned with local issues. Each issuing authority has its own series of LNTMs – there is no international standard numbering or indexing scheme. Individual LNTMs may concern short or long term situations. Mariners are instructed by LNTM 28/07 to "keep clear of warship berths". LNTM 5/2008 concerns "Bunkering or transferring oil in port". No. 16 of 2008 "Sea defence works at Hayling Island" gives timely information about dredging operations.

== See also ==
- Buoy
- Coast Pilots
- List of Lights
- Sailing Directions
