= United States Coast Pilot =

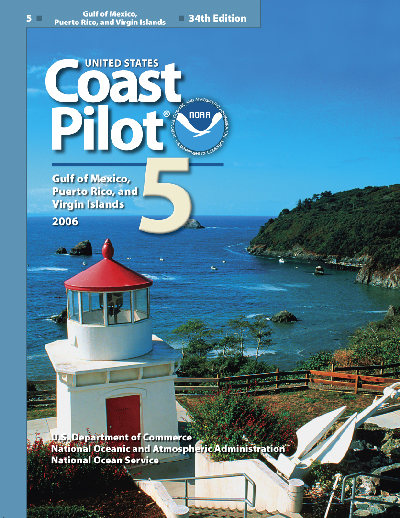
- The front cover of Coast Pilot Volume Five
- Frequency: Yearly
- Publisher: National Ocean Service

United States Coast Pilot is a ten-volume American navigation publication distributed yearly by the Office of Coast Survey, a part of the National Oceanic and Atmospheric Administration's National Ocean Service. The purpose of the publication is to supplement nautical charts of the waters of the United States.

== Contents ==
Each volume of the United States Coast Pilot contains comprehensive sections on local operational considerations and navigation regulations, with later chapters containing detailed discussions of coastal navigation; an appendix provides information on obtaining additional weather information, communications services, and other data. An index and additional tables complete the volume.

Information comes from field inspections, survey vessels, and various harbor authorities. Maritime officials and pilotage associations provide additional information. Each volume of Coast Pilot is updated regularly using the weekly United States Government's weekly Notice to Mariners.

Coast Pilot volumes provide more detailed information than the National Geospatial-Intelligence Agency-produced multi-volume Sailing Directions publication because Sailing Directions is intended exclusively for the oceangoing mariner.

== History ==
Various charts and pilot books for North American waters were published in England beginning in 1671, but the first book of sailing directions, charts, and other information for mariners in North American waters published in North America was the American Coast Pilot, first produced by Edmund M. Blunt in Newburyport, Massachusetts, in 1796. In 1833, Blunt's son Edmund E. Blunt accepted employment with the United States Coast Survey, and this began a relationship between the Blunt family and the Coast Survey in which the Coast Survey provided hydrographic survey information to the Blunts for incorporation into the American Coast Pilot and the Blunts sold the Survey's charts, while the Blunts served as influential allies of the Survey in defending the Survey against its critics and lobbying for funding of the Survey's efforts.

Other than providing information to the Blunts for publication in the American Coast Pilot and charts for them to sell, the Coast Survey relied exclusively on articles published in local newspapers to provide its information to mariners. This began to change in 1858, when the Coast Survey's George Davidson adapted an article published in a San Francisco, California, newspaper into an addendum to that year's Annual Report of the Superintendent of the Coast Survey. It was the first time that the Coast Survey had published a mariner's guide of any kind outside of a newspaper or the Blunts' American Coast Pilot, and it is retrospectively considered the first example of what would later become the United States Coast Pilot.

Twenty-one editions of the American Coast Pilot had been published by the time George W. Blunt sold the copyright for the publication to the U.S. Government in 1867. Although by that time the American Coast Pilot already consisted almost entirely of public information produced by the Coast Survey anyway, the transaction placed responsibility for regular production of the publication with the Coast Survey for the first time. The publication existed under various names until 1888, when the name United States Coast Pilot was adopted for volumes covering navigation along the United States East Coast and United States Gulf Coast. Thirty years later, the name also began to be applied to volumes covering the United States West Coast and the Territory of Alaska.

The Coast Survey, known from 1878 as the United States Coast and Geodetic Survey, continued to publish the Coast Pilot until it merged with other U.S. Government agencies to form the National Oceanic and Atmospheric Administration (NOAA) on 3 October 1970. The Office of Coast Survey in NOAA's National Ocean Service has published them since then.

== See also ==
- Bowditch's American Practical Navigator
- Buoy
- Light List
- List of lights
- Local notice to mariners
- Notice to mariners
- Sailing Directions
- United States Coast Survey
