= Sailing Directions =

Details of routes for coastal navigation

Sailing Directions are volumes published by various National Hydrographic Offices or Coast Guard Agencies which provide essential information to support port entry and coastal navigation for all classes of vessels at sea. Sailing directions are part of the carriage requirements defined by the SOLAS Convention.

== Content ==
Sailing Directions contain information on countries, navigational hazards, buoyage, pilotage, regulations, anchorages and port facilities, seasonal currents, ice and climatic conditions. Diagrams and photos are included to help identify places through textual description during coastal navigation and to support the passage planning stage. This information, when used alongside official navigational charts, will provide context and can help to increase the situational awareness of the bridge team.

Sailing directions, also known as Pilots, provide the local knowledge and awareness which would typically be provided by a local marine pilot.

== History ==
The oldest sailing directions, dating back to the middle ages, descended directly from the Greek and Roman periplii: in classical times, in the absence of real nautical charts, navigation was carried out using books that described the coast, not necessarily intended for navigation, but more often consisting of reports of previous voyages, or celebrations of the deeds of leaders or rulers.

They were known as Portolani (singular: Portolano) which derives from the Latin word portus which means port. Their introduction dates back to the 13th century, first in Italy and then in Spain.

Unlike nautical charts, of which there are no traces in the Greek and Roman era and of which the first examples date back to the 13th century, the periplus and, subsequently, the portolani make use of an uninterrupted and substantially unchanged tradition that derives from centuries of use and experience. The oldest example of a portolano for the Mediterranean Sea is the Periplus of Scylax of Carianda.

The Compasso da navegare, created by an anonymous Italian and written in the Sabir language, the Mediterranean lingua franca, dates back to the Middle Ages. The medievalistso date it back to the mid-13th century based on philological comparisons with other versions of the same text. The term compasso probably dates back to the Latin verb compassare, or to measure in steps, while the connection to the compass (divider) itself, as an instrument for measuring distances, is not excluded.

Among the other important portolan charts created between the 13th and 15th centuries, we can mention the oldest example for offshore navigation in the Atlantic Ocean, created for routes from Scandinavia to the large islands in the north of the Ocean, dating back to the mid-13th century and belonging to the Valedemar Code; and the first French portolan chart regarding the Mediterranean Sea, called Le grant routier, and written in 1485 but then reproduced, on several occasions, until 1643.

The texts dating back to the aforementioned periods were not accompanied by nautical charts, except for some drawings of the coastal profiles, printed or inserted later between the pages. With the advent of geographical explorations in the fifteenth century in Spain and Portugal, portolan charts were covered by state secrecy.

The other nautical charts of the fourteenth, fifteenth and sixteenth centuries, mostly handwritten on parchments called portolaniche, sometimes not bound, sometimes collected in atlases, were accompanied by extensive descriptive legends of particular features of the coast, and instructions for the seafarer. These maps were drawn without taking into account the curvature of the Earth and had rhumb lines on them: this made them unsuitable for use as a guide when crossing an ocean. They were instead useful when navigating in small seas, such as the Mediterranean and the Red Sea.

The first portolan with nautical charts is De Spieghel der Zeevaerdt, published between 1583 and 1584 by the Dutchman Lucas Janszoon Waghenaer who, in order to expand the market for his product to all the navies of Europe, translated it into French, English and German. Waghenaer's work was so well done that the English Admiralty commissioned a remake of it from Sir Anthony Ashley, who produced The Mariners' Mirrour, published around 1588 and later released in a French edition with the name Du Miroir de la navigation in 1590.

Throughout the 17th century, large portolan-atlases were used in Europe, usually of Dutch production even if derived from foreign maps, in several volumes covering the entire globe, which included a detailed description of the coasts from port to port, accompanied by rudimentary views of the coast inserted in the text, as well as nautical charts at variable scales.

Only in the 18th century was the portolano definitively distinguished from the nautical chart: the charts were mainly grouped together in atlases of regional size, and the portolano took on the value it has today, that is, a nautical document produced by official cartographic bodies.

== Sailing Directions Today ==
Many nations publish Sailing Directions for their home waters and in foreign waters, where they are the designated by the International Hydrographic Organization's (IHO) as the Primary Charting Authority. Neighboring countries or other areas of national interest are also often covered with a few Hydrographic Offices offering a worldwide coverage. Volumes are usually published in the national language but many countries publish also an equivalent English version. Some nations make their own volumes available for free download, while others sell them directly or through agents.

Depending on the producing authority, Sailing directions are available as subscriptions, hard copies or digital versions; in order to maintain compliance, the content is maintained up to date by regular updates and new editions.

The recommendations for Sailing Directions are contained under the M-3 Resolutions of the IHO publication.

== Sources ==
The text of this article originated from sections 402 to 404 of the American Practical Navigator, a document produced by the government of the United States of America and amended by marine analysts at the National Geospatial-Intelligence Agency. Following comments about being too specific, the article is currently (2024) being made more general by senior editors at Istituto Idrografico della Marina and the UK Hydrographic Office, avoiding references to specific products and adding the history of the product from other Wikipedia entries as well as more references.

== Gallery ==
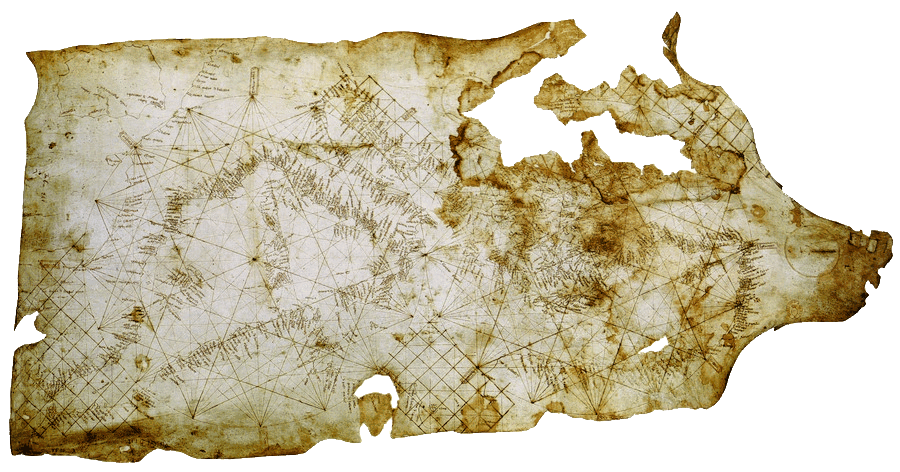
Carta Pisana, 1296.

Portolan Chart by Albino de Canepa, 1489.

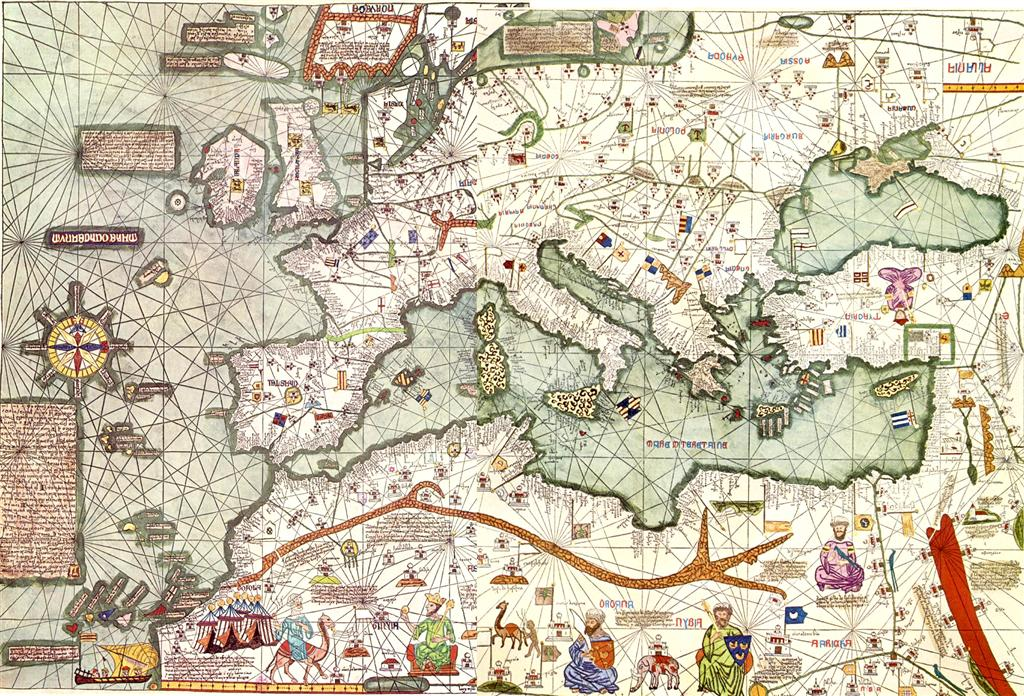
Part of the Catalan Atlas by Abraham Cresques, 1375, National French Library.

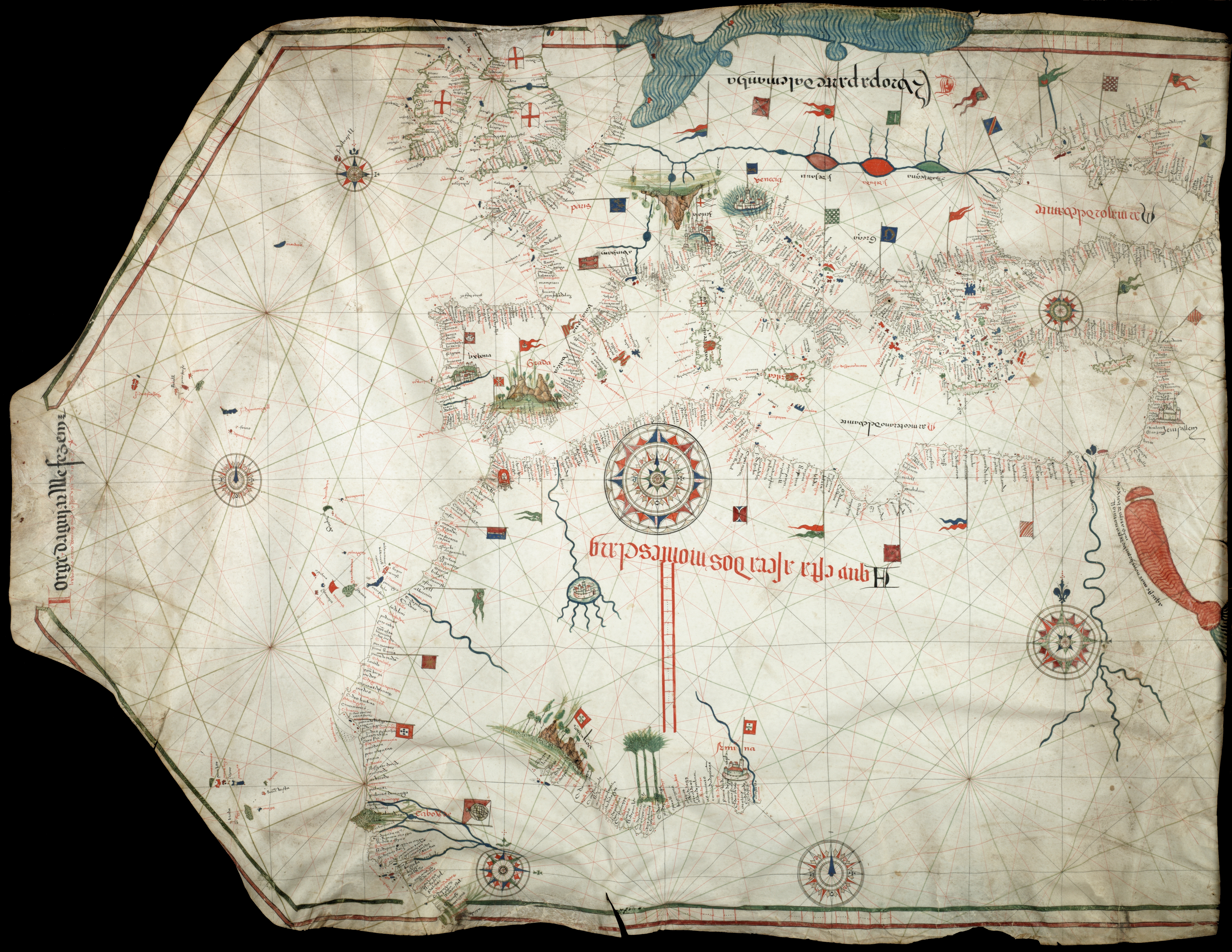
Portuguese Portolan by Jorge de Aguiar (1492), Yale University.

== See also ==
- American Practical Navigator – Encyclopedia of maritime navigation
- Australian Pilot – Editions of Sailing Directions for Australian coastal navigators
- Buoy – Floating structure or device
- Light List – Publication describing lighthouses and other aids to maritime navigation
- List of Lights – Publication describing lighthouses and other aids to maritime navigation
- Local Notice to Mariners
- Notice to Mariners – Advisory document updating navigational safety information
- United States Coast Pilots
