= Notice to mariners =

Advisory document updating navigational safety information

A notice to mariners (NtM or NOTMAR) advises mariners of important matters affecting navigational safety, including new hydrographic information, changes in channels and aids to navigation, and other important data.

Over 60 countries which produce nautical charts also produce a notice to mariners. About one third of these are weekly, another third are bi-monthly or monthly, and the rest irregularly issued according to need. For example, the United Kingdom Hydrographic Office issues weekly updates.

== History ==
The U.S. Navy Hydrographic Office published its first NtM in 1869 and has issued NtMs weekly since 1886. How the information is compiled, organized and disseminated has evolved in the years since then but the NtM mission to provide mariners with accurate navigation information has remained the same.

As part of its campaign for the 2022 Russian invasion of Ukraine, in February 2022 the Russian Navy established an effective blockade of the Ukrainian Black Sea coast and Russky Mir authorities declared NtMs for the majority of the northern Black Sea. This caused the Joint Negotiating Group of global shipowners to designate the northern half of the Black Sea and the entire Sea of Azov as "Warlike Operations Areas", which caused marine insurance to skyrocket. This in turn caused commercial traffic to move to alternative ports at the price of increased transit times, which had the deleterious effect of increased prices at the cash register.

== Variances ==
=== United States ===
The U.S. Notice to Mariners is made available weekly by the National Geospatial-Intelligence Agency (NGA), prepared jointly with the National Ocean Service (NOS) and the U.S. Coast Guard. The information in the Notice to Mariners is formatted to simplify the correction of paper charts, List of Lights, United States Coast Pilots, and other publications produced by NGA, NOS, and the U.S. Coast Guard.

Information for the Notice to Mariners is contributed by: the National Geospatial-Intelligence Agency (Department of Defense) for waters outside the territorial limits of the United States; National Ocean Service (National Oceanic and Atmospheric Administration, Department of Commerce), which is charged with surveying and charting the coasts and harbors of the United States and its territories; the U.S. Coast Guard (Department of Homeland Security) which is responsible for the safety of life at sea and the establishment and operation of aids to navigation; and the Army Corps of Engineers (Department of Defense), which is charged with the improvement of rivers and harbors of the United States. In addition, important contributions are made by foreign hydrographic offices and cooperating observers of all nationalities.

The Notice consists of a page of Hydrograms listing important items in the Notice, a chart correction section organized by ascending chart number, a product catalog corrections section, a publications correction section, a summary of broadcast navigation warnings, and a page of additional miscellaneous information. It is the responsibility of users to decide which of their charts and publications require correction. Mariners are requested to cooperate in the correction of charts and publications by reporting all discrepancies between published information and conditions actually observed and by recommending appropriate improvements. A reporting form is provided in the back of each Notice to Mariners.

Issue No. 1 of each year contains important information on a variety of subjects which supplements information not usually found on charts and in navigational publications. This information is published as Special Notice to Mariners Paragraphs. Additional items considered of interest to the mariner are also included in this Notice.

Much of the data in the U.S. Notice to Mariners is obtained from foreign notices.

=== Canada ===
In Canada, the Canadian Coast Guard (CCG) Notice to Mariners publication informs mariners of important navigational safety matters affecting Canadian Waters. This electronic publication is published on a monthly basis and can be downloaded from the Notices to Mariners (NOTMAR) Web site. The information in the Notice to Mariners is formatted to simplify the correction of paper charts and navigational publications.

The NOTMAR.gc.ca site is a free 24/7 service providing mariners with up-to-date safety advisories. It provides mariners with a quick and easy to use interface to access Notices to Mariners information. This system also generates weekly and monthly notification mailers, for its registered users. These on-line mail services provides the monthly Notices to Mariners publications as well as the weekly (section II - chart corrections) notices that advise the mariner of the notices that have been issued against their chart selections. These mail services simplify the process for registered clients to update their publications and charts as required under the Canada Shipping Act.

The NOTMAR web site also includes the historical Chart corrections and historical Sailing Direction corrections; as well, it provides access to downloadable Chart Patches, contains links to CHS’s Chart Number 1, instructions for applying Notices to mariners to manually update their paper charts, and other useful information.

== Summary of Corrections ==
A close companion to the Notice to Mariners is the Summary of Corrections. The Summary is published in five volumes. Each volume covers a major portion of the earth including several chart regions and many subregions. Volume 5 also includes special charts and publications corrected by the Notice to Mariners. Since the Summaries contain cumulative corrections, any chart, regardless of its print date, can be corrected with the proper volume of the Summary and all subsequent Notice to Mariners.

== See also ==
- Notice to Airmen – Aviation notice of potential flight hazards — aeronautical – Science involved with the study, design, and manufacturing of airflight-capable machines equivalent
- Bowditch's American Practical Navigator – Encyclopedia of maritime navigation
- Buoy – Floating structure or device
- United States Coast Pilot
- List of lights – Publication describing lighthouses and other aids to maritime navigation
- Local Notice to Mariners
- Sailing Directions – Details of routes for coastal navigation
