= Witherby Publishing Group =

Publisher of maritime reference material

Coordinates: 55.879159°N 3.527648°W

Witherby Publishing Group Ltd.
- Founded: 1740
- Founder: Thomas Witherby
- Country of origin: United Kingdom
- Headquarters location: Livingston, West Lothian and Edinburgh, Scotland, UK
- Key people: Captain Dr Iain Macneil (CEO), MNM, Kat Heathcote (Commercial Director), MBE Gillian Macrosson, MD.
- Revenue: £14.9 million (2022),
- No. of employees: 55
- Official website: www.witherbypublishinggroup.com

Witherby Publishing Group, formerly known as Witherby Seamanship, is a technical publisher of maritime, nautical and navigation training, reference and regulatory materials. The company is the resulting merger of Witherby Books and Seamanship International in January 2008. Beginning with its origins in 1740 it lays claim to being the oldest independent publisher in the English-speaking world.

Witherbys publish guidance titles with numerous shipping bodies and maritime NGOs. These include the International Chamber of Shipping, the UK Chamber of Shipping, BIMCO, OCIMF, SIGTTO, North P&I, the UK P&I Club, the International Association of Classification Societies, the Merchant Navy Training Board and the Institute of Marine Engineering, Science and Technology (IMarEST), as well as acting as an official electronic distributor for the International Maritime Organization. Witherbys are an official distributor of INTERTANKO publications.

The company holds working groups, which include specialist consultants from relevant sectors, as well as in-house technical advisors, authors and editors, to produce their publications.

== History ==
The company's tradition of publishing and bookselling was initially started by the stationer Thomas Witherby at the company's founding in 1740 in the City of London. The early company developed as a stationers and as a copier and producer of legal documents, including articles of agreements, bonds and pro-forma contracts for marine insurance and carriage of goods by sea, operating in proximity to the maritime trade of the adjacent Coffeehouses. From 1749 until 1873, the company was located at Birchin Lane, adjacent to Lombard Street in London before later moving to several premises, including a building in Clerkenwell and later in Aylesbury Street, Islington. Throughout this period, the operating name of the changed from Witherby and Son to Witherby and Company, including a subsidiary HF and G Witherby that specialised in ornithology books under the auspices of Harry Forbes Witherby, a descendant of Thomas Witherby. The collections of the early Witherby company are available at the London Metropolitan Archives.

In 1998, the company Seamanship International was begun by Iain Macneil providing training materials for the maritime industry from Scotland and in 2008 the company bought out and merged with Witherbys, moving the business to Scotland (the physical printing arm of the company was sold off under the name WKG Print). Since relocating to Scotland, the company has expanded to become one of the largest maritime publishers in the world, publishing over 400 titles to over 110 countries in the world. It is estimated that there are more than a million Witherby ebooks in use on over 40,000 ships. In 2017, the company was awarded a new coat of arms by the Court of the Lord Lyon which includes Scottish Blackface rams and the Birlinn, an historical West Highlands galley.

In December 2020, David Balston, a former Royal Navy Vanguard-class submarine Commander, Prime Ministerial advisor and head of Policy at the UK Chamber of Shipping joined Witherbys as Deputy Chairman and non-executive director. In March 2023, David Balston was appointed Chairman of Witherbys.

== Location ==
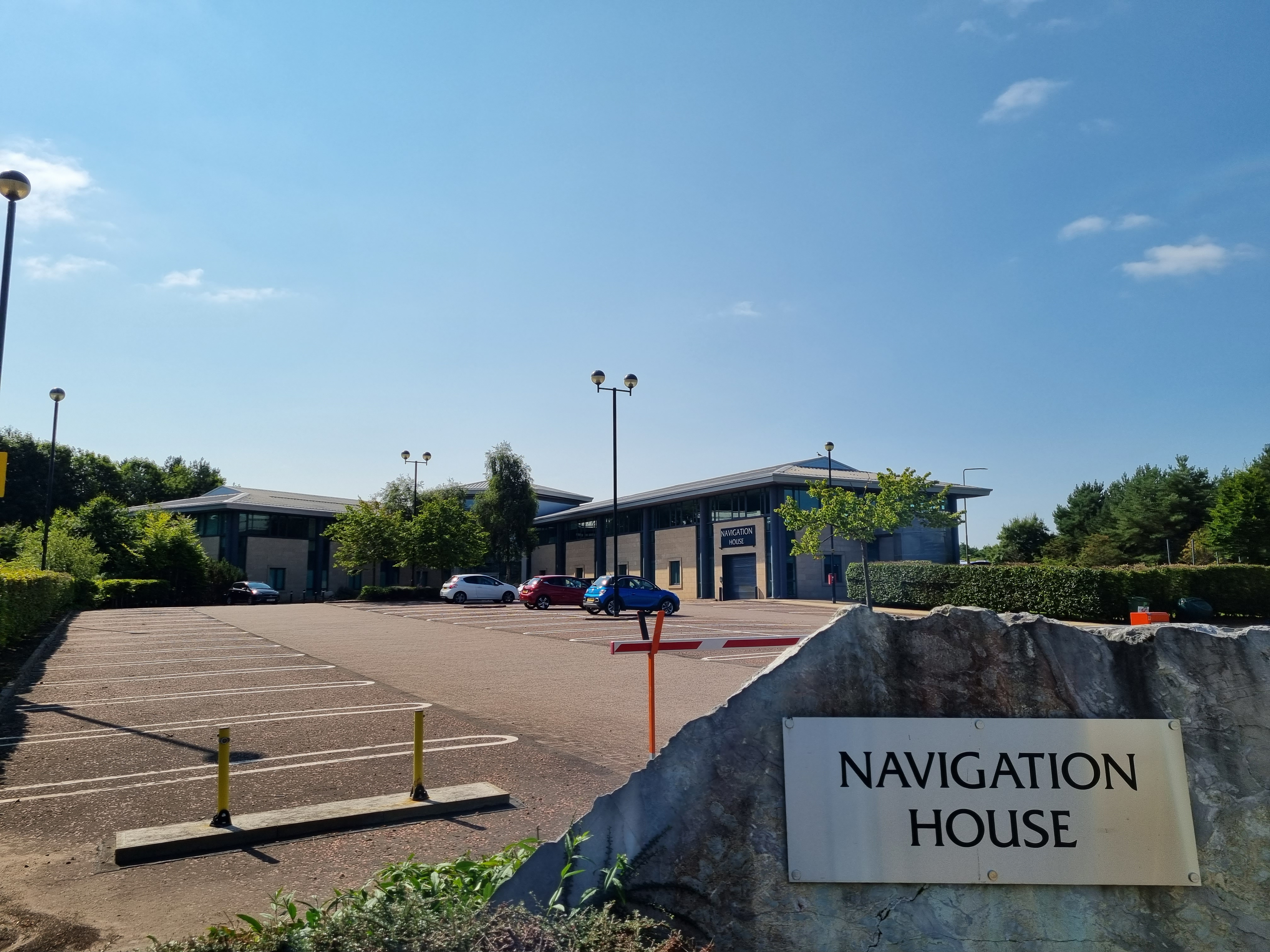
Navigation House in Livingston

The company has registered offices in Edinburgh, Scotland, with the main offices and warehouse being located at Navigation House in Livingston, Scotland.

== Products ==
Witherbys publishes on a range of maritime technical and operational subjects including navigation, Ballast Water Management, ECDIS, Oil tanker operations, LNG tanker operations, seamanship, ship stability and passage planning.

Together with the UK P&I Club, Witherbys publishes the marine reference book Carefully to Carry, which contains guidance on the safe carriage, loading and storage of cargo on cargo ships. In September 2021, with the UK P&I Club and CAE, Witherby published a safety publication entitled Maritime Team Dynamics, a safety book comparing aviation and maritime incidents.

In February 2019, in conjunction with BIMCO and International Shipcare, Witherbys released the Ship Lay-up Guide.

In response to IMO efforts to require cyber security to be addressed under the International Safety Management Code, in November 2019, together with BIMCO and the International Chamber of Shipping Witherbys published the Cyber Security Workbook for Onboard Ship Use. A second edition was published in October 2020.

On behalf of OCIMF and the International Chamber of Shipping, the company publishes the International Safety Guide for Oil Tankers and Terminals (ISGOTT), which is used as a reference guide on most oil tankers and in most terminals. A sixth edition of ISGOTT was published in June 2020. With OCIMF, Witherbys also publish the Mooring Equipment Guidelines, the 4th edition was published in 2018.

In partnership with the International Chamber of Shipping, Witherbys publishes Drug Trafficking and Drug Abuse On Board Ship: Guidelines for Owners and Masters on Preparation, Prevention, Protection and Response. In 2021, the sixth edition of the publication was released, offering guidance on how to protect the ship and crew via a range of security measures, while reducing the risk of drug trafficking occurring on board. Witherbys also publish the ICS guidance on Maritime security with a publication entitled Maritime Security - A comprehensive Guide for Shipowners, Seafarers and Administrations.

With Maritime Industry Australia, Witherbys publish a Passage Planning Guide for the Great Barrier Reef and Torres Strait.

Together with BIMCO, the company publishes an annual guidance title on contractual risks entitled Check Before Fixing.

In 2021, the company issued Witherby Connect, an eBook reader software for the marine industry. Also in 2021, the company launched an LNG carrier mooring tool called SHIPMOOR in partnership with the research company HR Wallingford.

In June 2022, with BIMCO and the Danish Pilotage Organisation DanPilot, the company published a Passage Planning Guide on the Baltic Sea covering the region from Skagen to Bornholm. In August 2022, in partnership with ICS and BIMCO, Witherbys published a guidance title for the shipping industry on biofouling entitled Biofouling, Biosecurity and Hull Cleaning.

In 2023, together with the International Chamber of Shipping, the company released an updated version of the industry publication Drug Trafficking and Drug Abuse On Board Ship.

In January 2024, the company published an updated edition of The Pilot Ladder Manual which details regulations and procedures on maritime pilot pilot ladder embarkation and disembarkation. In 2024, the company released ECDIS Passage Planning and Watchkeeping, an updated title for maritime professionals using ECDIS. In 2024, Witherbys with the International Chamber of Shipping, provided guidance to ships on managing the risks associated with stowaways and with rescue of displaced persons at sea.

In 2025, they released an updated maritime security guide for shipowners and seafarers with the International Chamber of Shipping. In November 2025, Witherbys concluded a licensing agreement with The Stationery Office to release authorised digital editions of Maritime and Coastguard Agency and International Labour Organization publications.

== Awards ==
Awards for the publisher have included the Queens Award for Enterprise, a Lloyds List Training Award and a Green Award. In March 2017, the company won the Sea Transport Award for 'best marine training material publishing company'.

== Charitable trust and scholarships ==
In 2020, the company funded two publishing scholarships with Edinburgh Napier University and the University of Stirling. In 2021, the company offered a scholarship for an MLitt in Publishing Studies at the Stirling University Centre for International Publishing and Communication.

The company manages a charitable trust which provides funds for sport, arts and education in Scotland. In 2010, the trust paid for sports equipment for children in Malawi. In 2019, the trust lead fundraising efforts to provide a gift of a new Steinway piano to St Mary's Music School in the West End of Edinburgh. For Christmas 2020, the trust funded the Witherby Arts Festival to support emerging musicians in Scotland. In June 2021, the trust supported the summer camp of the Royal Scottish National Orchestra (RSNO). In September 2021, the trust donated £4,000 to the community Cairngorm Biathlon & Nordic Ski Club. In December 2021, the trust celebrated reaching £1,000,000 of charitable giving since 2011.

In March 2023, the trust donated £105,000 to provide scholarships and bursaries for students from rural backgrounds to attend the University of the Highlands and Islands. In August 2023, the trust sponsored a summer music festival to support emerging artists at the Eden Court Theatre in Inverness.

== Research Ships ==
=== MV Astra ===
In 2020, Witherbys purchased MV Astra, a 24 metre Finnish-Swedish ice class rescue ship (formerly operated as the lead vessel of the Swedish Sea Rescue Society). The ship undertook conversion work in 2021 and provided research opportunities for Witherbys, including the undertaking of an expedition to complete a 22,000 nautical mile circumnavigation in 2021/2022 via the Cape of Good Hope and Cape Horn. The voyage began in December 2021 departing from Lanzarote. The ship then sailed to the Pacific Ocean via Cape Horn. By mid-February 2022, the ship had reached its halfway point of a 25,000 mile circumnavigation. On 16 May 2022, the ship completed its circumnavigation becoming the first sub-24m motor-powered vessel to circumnavigate the globe via the southern capes, setting a new world record for this class and voyage. The ship was listed for sale in 2023.

=== MV Sea Ranger ===
In November 2025, the company purchased Sea Ranger, a 78-meter former salvage and research vessel (IMO number 1004900). The vessel is intended to support their publications and carry out shipboard research. The vessel was formerly named Lone Ranger and was the first research ship of the Schmidt Ocean Institute. The ship carries some 1.2 million litres of fuel and has a range of at least 30,000 nautical miles. The ship was built at Schichau Unterweser at their Bremerhaven shipyard in the 1970s, being delivered in 1973. She was originally in service as an ocean-going and ice-class salvage tug before being converted into a yacht by the Malta Drydock Company in 1994.
