= Baltic and International Maritime Council =

International shipowners shipping association

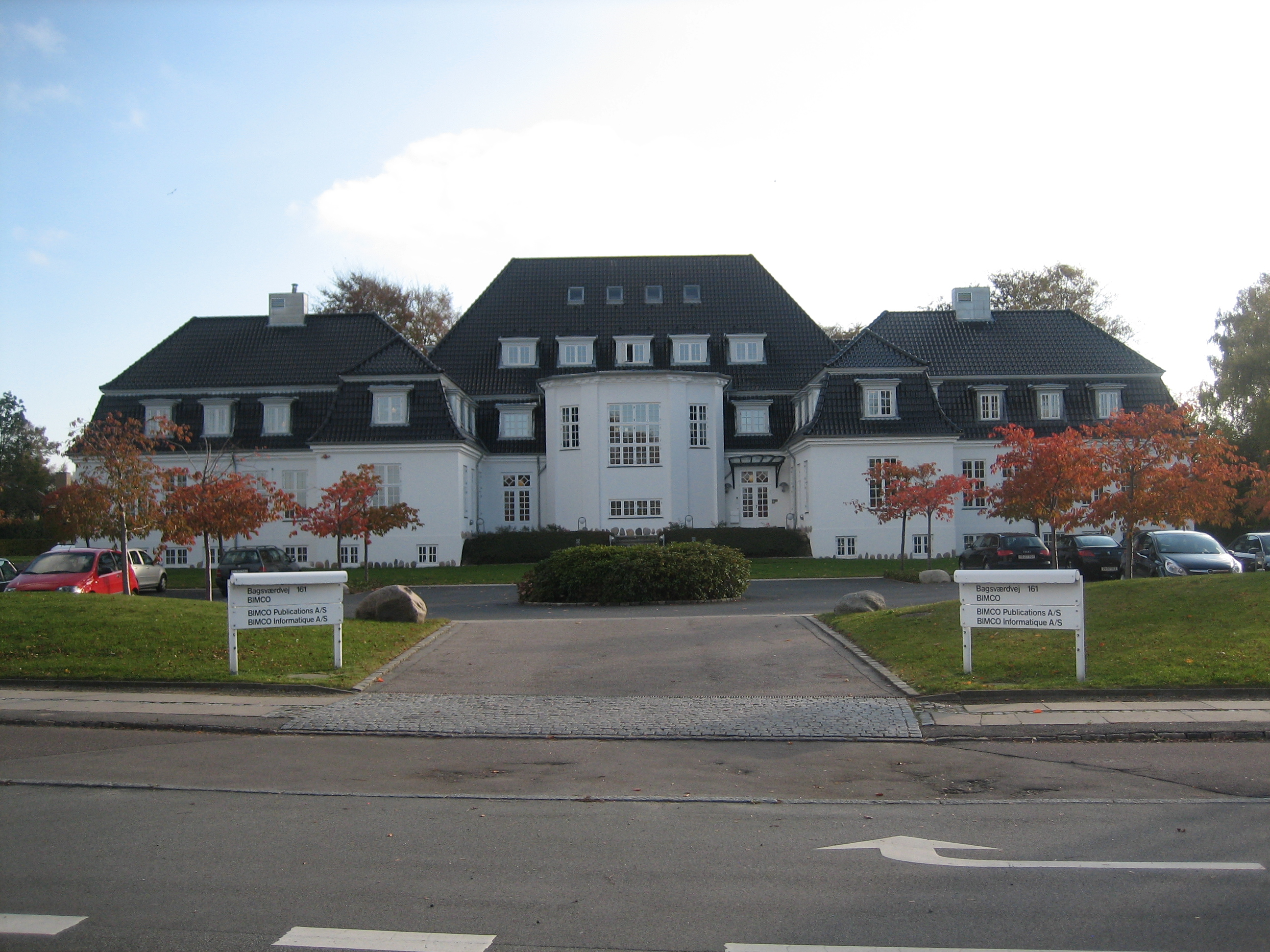
BIMCO Headquarters seen from its entrance at 2880 Bagsværd near Copenhagen, Denmark

The Baltic and International Maritime Council (BIMCO) is one of the largest of the international shipping associations representing shipowners. BIMCO states that its membership represents approximately 60 percent of the world's merchant shipping tonnage and that it has members in more than 130 countries, including managers, brokers and agents. BIMCO states that its primary objective is to protect its global membership through the provision of information and advice, while promoting fair business practices and facilitating harmonisation and standardisation of commercial shipping practices and contracts.

BIMCO's headquarters is in Bagsværd, a suburb of Copenhagen, Denmark. The current President is Nikolaus H. Schües, who took over as the 46th President of BIMCO in May 2023. The current Secretary General and CEO is David Loosley, who was previously CEO at IMarEST.

To support the development and refinement of maritime regulations, BIMCO is accredited as a Non-Governmental Organisation (NGO) with all relevant United Nations organs, specifically the International Maritime Organization. In an effort to promote its agenda and objectives, the association maintains a close dialogue with governments and diplomatic representations around the world, including maritime administrations, regulatory institutions, and other stakeholders within the areas of EU, the United States, and Asia. BIMCO also conducts various training programmes around the world for the Maritime community.

== History ==
BIMCO was founded in 1905 in Copenhagen by a group of shipowners who came together to agree timber freight rates. In 1913, the organisation created the first draft of a standard charter party agreement. By 2016, the organisation had 2,200 member companies.

== Publications ==
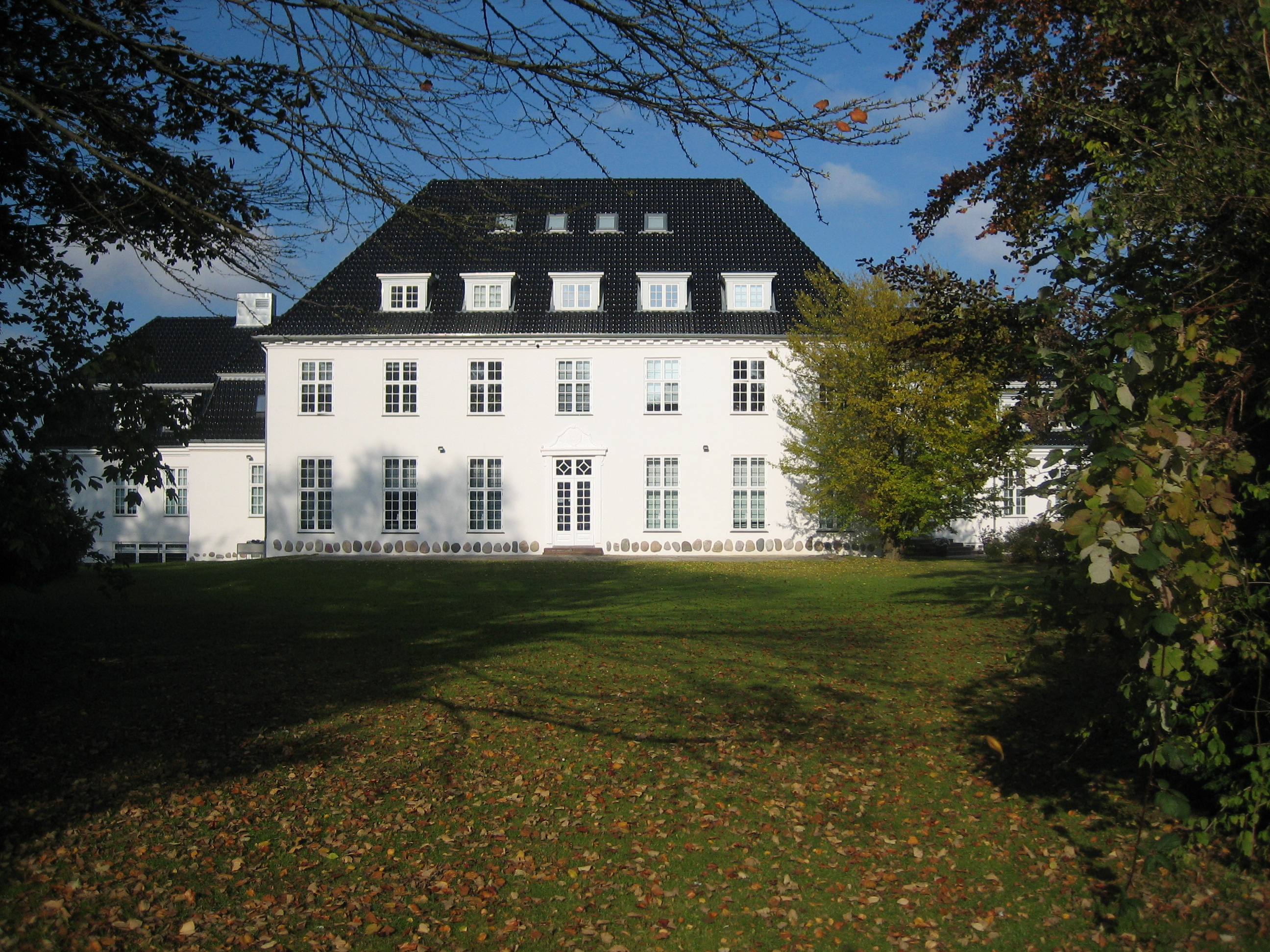
The rear of BIMCO headquarters in Bagsværd near Copenhagen, Denmark

BIMCO produces industry guidance and publications in partnership with the Witherby Publishing Group. For example, cyber security has come under increased focus in the maritime industry since the IMO required cyber security to be addressed under the International Safety Management Code and in 2019, BIMCO, the International Chamber of Shipping, and Witherbys published the Cyber Security Workbook for Onboard Ship Use. The second edition of the nautical workbook was published in 2021.

In 2021, with Witherbys, BIMCO published an updated guidance title on contractual risks entitled Check Before Fixing.

BIMCO publishes industry standard contracts for ocean towage, including TOWCON and TOWHIRE which were updated in 2021. The organisation also publishes shipbuilding contracts.

In August 2022, in partnership with Witherbys and ICS, BIMCO issued a guidance title for the shipping industry on biofouling entitled Biofouling, Biosecurity and Hull Cleaning.
