= International Safety Guide for Oil Tankers and Terminals =

Code of practice first published in 1978

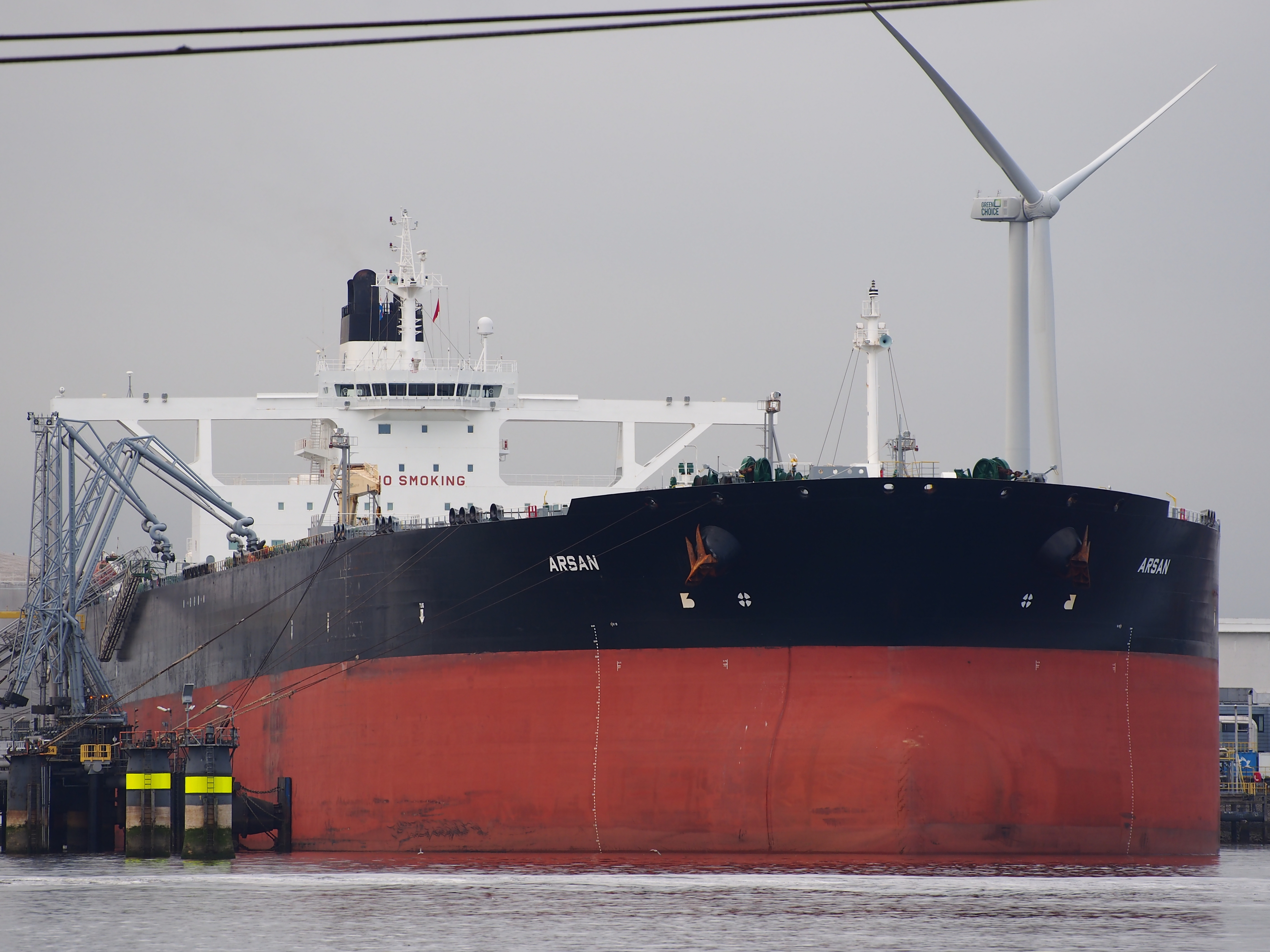
The guide covers the safe operation of oil tankers, as seen in this image

The International Safety Guide for Oil Tankers and Terminals (often shortened to ISGOTT) is a standard code of practice for the safe operation of Oil tankers and Oil terminals. Published by Witherbys, it is a joint publication produced by the International Chamber of Shipping (ICS), the Oil Companies International Marine Forum (OCIMF), and the International Association of Ports and Harbors (IAPH).

== History ==
It was first published in 1978. ISGOTT has its roots in the late 1960s and early 1970s when the shipping industry recognised the need for comprehensive guidelines to ensure the safety of oil tankers and terminals. During this time, there were increasing concerns about the safety and environmental risks associated with the transportation and handling of oil. In response to these concerns, the ICS and OCIMF collaborated to develop a guide that would establish standardised safety practices for the industry. The guide aimed to address various aspects of safety, including cargo handling, emergency response, personnel safety, and environmental protection. Over the years, ISGOTT has undergone several revisions and updates to incorporate advancements in technology, changes in regulations, and improvements in industry best practices.

A sixth edition of ISGOTT was published in June 2020.

== Content ==
The publication provides information to ship-owners, seafarers and oil companies on best practice operating practices, national and international legislation, occupational safety and health and ship design relating to oil tankers and Oil terminals.

The collaborative effort between ICS, OCIMF and IAPH in developing ISGOTT emphasises the importance of cooperation between shipping companies and oil companies to establish and promote international safety standards. The guide has become a widely recognised and respected resource in the maritime and oil industries, providing a common framework for safe operations.

== See also ==
- MARPOL 73/78 – International marine environmental convention
- Marpol Annex I – 1983 convention on ocean pollution
