= Code of safe working practices =

The Code of Safe Working Practices (COSWP) is published by the Maritime and Coastguard Agency (MCA) of the UK.

The code details the regulatory framework for health and safety aboard ship, safety management and statutory duties underlying to the advice in the code and the areas that should be covered when introducing a new recruit to safety procedures on board.

The code arose from the Health and Safety at Work etc. Act 1974.

== See also ==
- Healthy Enterprise
