= European Shipowners (ECSA) =

European Shipowners (ESCA) is a trade association for the European shipping industry. European Shipowners control 34.5% of the global commercial fleet, contribute €148.7 billion per year to the EU GDP, and employ 1.7 million people both on board and ashore.

Founded in 1965 under the name Comité des Associations d'Armateurs des Communautés Européennes (CAACE), ES|ECSA promotes the interests of 21 member associations of the EU and Norway. As a trade association, ES | ECSA strives for a regulatory environment that fosters the international competitiveness of European shipping, to the benefit of the EU.

== Organisation ==
ES|ECSA works through a permanent secretariat in Brussels led by Secretary General Sotiris Raptis, a Board of Directors and a number of specialised committees and working groups. The current presidency consist of President Mikki Koskinen and Vice-President Nikolas Veniamis.

The organisation is recognised by the European Institutions as the representative body of the European shipping sector, and is registered in the European Commission's Transparency Register for Interest Representatives since 23 June 2008.

== Member Associations ==
- Belgium: Royal Belgian Shipowners' Association
- Bulgaria: Bulgarian Shipowners Association
- Croatia: Croatian Shipowners' Association Mare Nostrum
- Cyprus: Joint Cyprus Shipowners' Association
- Denmark: Danish Shipping
- Estonia: Estonian Shipowners' Association
- Finland: Finnish Shipowners' Association
- France: Armateurs de France
- Germany: Verband Deutscher Reeder
- Greece: Union of Greek Shipowners
- Ireland: Irish Chamber of Shipping
- Italy: Confederazione Italiana Armatori
- Lithuania: Lithuanian Shipowners
- Luxembourg: Fedilshipping
- Malta: Malta International Shipping Council
- Netherlands: Koninklijke Vereniging van Nederlandse Reders
- Norway: Norwegian Shipowners' Association
- Poland: Polish Shipping Association
- Portugal: Associação de Armadores da Marinha de Comercio
- Spain: Asociación de navieros españoles
- Sweden: Swedish Shipowners' Association

Many ES|ECSA members are also members of the International Chamber of Shipping (ICS).

== The European shipping industry ==
The economic impact of European shipping is estimated at €148.7 billion in 2023, up from €127.8 billion in 2021, supporting approximately 1.68 million jobs, compared with 1.45 million in 2021. Turnover reached €241.4 billion in 2023, rising from €186.7 billion in 2021.

Over 90% of European shipping companies own fewer than 10 vessels. Only 0.5% own fleets of more than 100 vessels. 6% have fewer than 25 vessels, 2% fewer than 50 and 1% have a fleet of between 50 and 100 vessels.

== The European Shipping Summit ==
European Shipowners | ECSA is the main organiser of the European Shipping Summit, a bi-annual two-day event bringing together European shipowners, the maritime sector and its supply chain, European and international policy makers, NGOs, industry stakeholders, seafarers and maritime workers to discuss the future of shipping and the biggest challenges of our time.

The next edition will take place on 17–18 March 2027.

== See also ==
- International Chamber of Shipping
- International Maritime Organization (the United Nations agency with responsibility for the safety of life at sea and the protection of the marine environment)
- International Labour Organization
- UNCTAD review of maritime transport (annual UNCTAD publication)
- European Transport Workers' Federation
