= Oil Companies International Marine Forum =

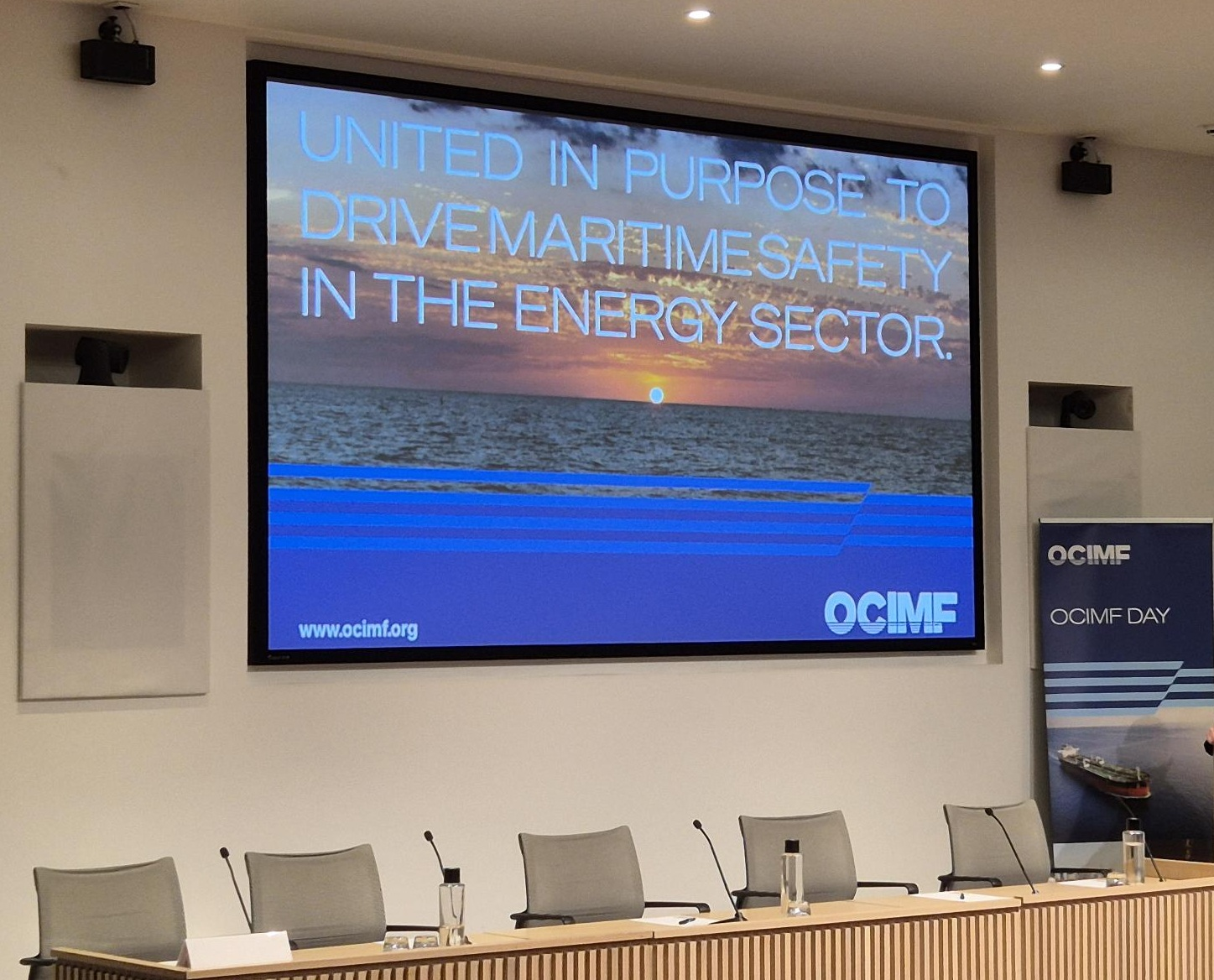
OCIMF Day Event 2026 in London

The Oil Companies International Marine Forum (OCIMF) is a voluntary association of oil and energy companies having an interest in the shipment and terminalling of crude oil, oil products, petrochemicals and gas, and includes companies engaged in offshore marine operations supporting oil and gas exploration, development and production.

OCIMF's aim is to ensure that the global marine industry operates safely and causes no harm to people or the environment. OCIMF's mission is to lead the global marine industry in the promotion of safe and environmentally responsible transportation of crude oil, oil products, petrochemicals and gas, and to drive the same values in the management of related offshore marine operations. This is to be done by developing best practices in the design, construction, and safe operation of tankers, barges, and offshore vessels and their interfaces with terminals and considering human factors.

== History ==
OCIMF was formed at a meeting in London on 8 April 1970. It was initially the oil industry's response to increasing public awareness of marine pollution, particularly by oil, after the Torrey Canyon incident.

Governments had reacted to this incident by debating the development of international conventions and national legislation and the oil industry sought to play its part by making its professional expertise available and its views known to governmental and inter-governmental bodies. The role of OCIMF has broadened over the intervening period. Most recently the organisation has contributed to the European Union (EU) discussion on tanker safety and the draft EU Directive on Environmental Liability, and has provided support to the EU and the International Maritime Organization (IMO) debate on the accelerated phasing out of single-hull tankers and on the carriage of heavy grades of oil.

OCIMF was incorporated in Bermuda in 1977 and a branch office was established in London primarily to maintain contact with the IMO.

== Organisation ==
OCIMF has 110 members. OCIMF’s committee structure comprises the Executive Committee at its head and four senior standing committees with the power to establish sub-committees or forums as necessary. The Executive Committee is the senior policymaking Committee of OCIMF. The membership of the Executive Committee is limited to a maximum of 15 members plus the Chairman and Vice Chairmen who are ex officio members. Members of the Executive Committee are elected at the Annual General Meeting.

The present chairman is Lambros Klaoudatos from BP Shipping who was appointed to the role in 2024. Previous Chairmans include Nick Potter from Shell plc (2022 to 2024), Mark Ross from Chevron (2018-2022) and Grahaeme Henderson (2014-2018) from Shell.

=== Vetting ===
OCIMF manages a Ship Inspection Report Programme (SIRE) programme which is a vetting database and inspection scheme for tankers, known as SIRE, with inspection questions and answers to be used by inspectors visiting ships. In 2022, Russian ships were restricted from using the system following sanctions. In September 2024, a new version of SIRE, referred to as SIRE 2.0 was released to the industry. In May 2026, the OCIMF annual report stated some 10,039 ships had been inspected with over 24,000 inspection reports also downloaded.

OCIMF also host the Offshore Vessel Inspection Database (OVID). This is for vessels that work in the Offshore drilling sector. The OVID is managed through committee work with the International Marine Contractors Association (IMCA).

=== Secretariat ===
A full-time Managing Director is in charge of a small permanent Secretariat located in London. In 2021, Karen Davis from ConocoPhillips served in the role and was replaced by Don Davis from Chevron Corporation in 2026.

This Secretariat comprises full-time employees and technical staff seconded from member companies. The work of OCIMF is carried out through four main Committees General Purposes Committee (GPC), Ports and Terminals Committee, Offshore Marine Committee and the Legal Committee. Sub-Committees, Forums, work groups and task forces composed of members' representatives and assisted by the Secretariat.

== Publications ==
OCIMF produces industry guidance for oil tankers and oil terminals, with Witherbys including the leading industry title, published with 'International Safety Guide for Oil Tankers and Terminals' (the 6th edition was published in 2020).

The OCIMF along with the Society of International Gas Tanker and Terminal Operators (SIGTTO) developed the Jetty Maintenance and Inspection Guide (JMIG) to provide guidelines for effective maintenance on oil and liquified gas terminal jetty equipment.
