= Russ Peters =

British businessman

- Occupation: Businessman

Russ Peters is a British businessman, who was the managing director of P&O Ferries from 1998 to 2006.

== Career ==
Peters joined P&O in 1987, initially as freight director of P&O European Ferries. He then became managing director of P&O North Sea Ferries in 1990, before becoming serving as managing director of P&O Ferries Dover from 1994 until 1998. When the joint venture with Stena Line created P&O Stena Line in March 1998, Peters became its managing director. After eight years and chief executive, he retired in 2006, being replaced by Helen Deeble. At the same time he retired from the Chair of Ferrymasters and the main board of P&O.

He is currently a non-executive board member of International Students House, a registered charity that provides accommodation for university students in central London.

Preceded by Unknown	MD of P&O Ferries; 1998-2006	Succeeded by Helen Deeble
