= Maritime and Coastguard Agency =

UK executive agency

- Abbreviation: MCA
- Predecessor: Coastguard Agency, Marine Safety Agency
- Established: 1 April 1998
- Legal status: Executive agency
- Purpose: Maritime Regulator
- Location: Southampton
- Region served: United Kingdom coast
- Chief Executive: Virginia McVea
- Non-Executive Chair: Simon Stevens
- Parent organisation: Department for Transport
- Subsidiaries: HM Coastguard
- Employees: 1,186 (2022/23)
- Website: gov.uk/mca

The Maritime and Coastguard Agency (MCA) is an executive agency of the United Kingdom that is responsible for implementing British and international maritime law and safety policy. It works to prevent the loss of lives at sea and to prevent marine pollution. It is a subsidiary executive agency of the UK Department for Transport and responsible through the Secretary of State for Transport to Parliament. It is also responsible for land based search and rescue helicopter operations since 2015. Its motto is "Safer Lives, Safer Ships, Cleaner Seas". The organisation is currently led by Virginia McVea.

== History ==
The MCA was established on 1 April 1998 following a government merger of the UK Coastguard Agency and the UK Marine Safety Agency (MSA).

The MCA was led by Vice Admiral Sir Alan Michael Massey between 2010 and 2018. Brian Johnson then served as Chief Executive of the MCA between 2018 and 2022. From 2022 to February 2023, Damien Oliver served as Interim MCA Chief Executive Officer. In February 2023, Virginia McVea was appointed as Chief Executive Officer.

In 2024, the MCA developed an online tool to provide easier search and filtering capabilities for ships and seafarers to find approved service stations for Life-saving appliances.

== Responsibilities ==
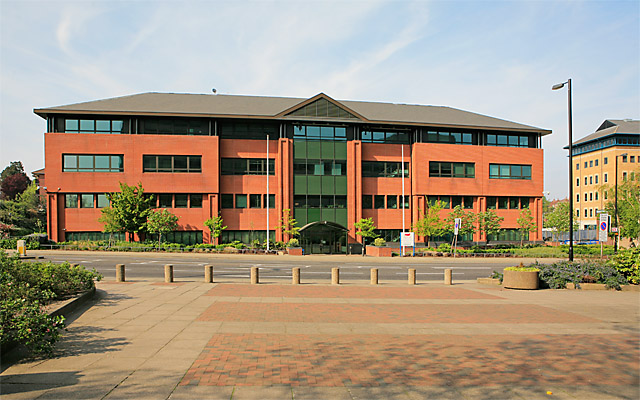
HQ of the Maritime and Coastguard Agency, Commercial Road, Southampton

Its responsibilities include coordinating search and rescue (SAR) on the coastline and at sea through HM Coastguard (HMCG), ensuring that ships meet international and UK safety standards, monitoring and preventing coastal water pollution and testing and issuing Merchant Navy Certificates of Competency (licences) for ships' officers and crew to STCW requirements. The MCA is chiefly responsible for the syllabus and national training standards issued by the Merchant Navy Training Board (based at the UK Chamber of Shipping). The MCA also requires seafarers to be certificated by an MCA approved doctor to confirm they are of a sufficient medical standard for work at sea, known as 'ENG 1'.

The MCA has three distinct "outward facing" elements — provision of search and rescue and prevention activity through HM Coastguard, port and flag state control of shipping through a network of Marine Offices and the development of international standards and policy for shipping through the International Maritime Organization. MCA utilises airborne assets in the form of helicopters, fixed wing aircraft and drones for SAR, and other, operations and is going to make greater use of these technologies under the UKSAR2G contract to be awarded in 2024.

The MCA has now established an automatic identification system (AIS) network around the UK coast, for real-time tracking and monitoring of shipping movements from the shore.

== Notices and guidance ==
The MCA publishes Merchant Shipping Notices which contain the technical detail of regulations (UK Statutory instruments). These are mandatory and must be complied with under UK legislation for UK flagged ships and ships in UK territorial waters. The MCA also provide UK Marine Guidance Notes and Marine Information Notices, designed to provide advice, guidance and information on topics such as pollution prevention and safety.

== See also ==
- Code of safe working practices
- Merchant navy
- Royal National Lifeboat Institution
