= Thomas Witherby =

Thomas Witherby (1719 – 26 November 1797) was the founder of Witherby's, now known as the Witherby Publishing Group, one of the oldest publishing companies in the United Kingdom. In 1740, he opened a stationer's shop at 9 Birchin Lane, London next door to the Sword Blade coffee house. His shop initially sold parchment, paper and stamps. By the time of his death his shop was selling over 11,000 stamped skins annually.

The family business grew into a printing business, a publisher specializing in marine subjects, a bookshop and other businesses.

Thomas Witherby's records and those of his apprentices are held within the Records of London's Livery Companies as well in the London Metropolitan Archives. These include precedent books containing pro forma specimen court documents and forms written in his own hand.

In 1767 he was elected to the Council of the City of London Corporation representing Langbourn Ward.

== Personal life ==
He was married to Elizabeth Witherby (died 7 April 1800).
