= International Chamber of Shipping =

- Formation: 1921
- Type: International Trade Association
- Purpose: To represent national shipowner associations, and advise on international policy
- Headquarters: London, United Kingdom
- Region served: Global
- Members: 80% world merchant tonnage
- Chairman: Mr Emmanuel Grimaldi
- Main organ: Marine Committee
- Affiliations: International Maritime Organization, International Labour Organization, National Governments, Other Inter-Governmental Organizations
- Staff: 30
- Website: http://www.ics-shipping.org

The International Chamber of Shipping is one of the world's principal shipping organisations, representing around 80% of the world's merchant tonnage through membership by national shipowners' associations. It is concerned with maritime regulatory, operational and legal issues. Its membership includes over 40 national shipowner organisations.

A major ICS activity is acting as a consultative body at the United Nations agency with responsibility for the safety of life at sea and the protection of the marine environment, the International Maritime Organization. ICS represents the global interests of all the different shipping trades in the industry, these include bulk carrier operators, tanker operators, passenger ship operators and container liner trades, including shipowners and third party ship managers.

ICS has consultative status with a number of other intergovernmental bodies which affect shipping, these include: the World Customs Organization, the International Telecommunication Union, the United Nations Conference on Trade and Development, and the World Meteorological Organization. The ICS also has close relationships with industry organisations representing different maritime interests such as shipping, ports, pilotage, the oil industry, insurance and classification societies responsible for the surveying of ships.

== History ==
ICS was established in 1921.

In 2018, Guy Platten was appointed Secretary General of ICS. In June 2025, Thomas Kazakos was appointed Secretary General to replace Guy Platten.

In 2024, Emanuele Grimaldi was appointed Chairman and will serve is expected to serve in this role until June 2026. The next chairman elect will be John Denholm.

== Location ==
In September 2021, the International Chamber of Shipping left office space near the Baltic Exchange in St Mary Axe and moved to Walsingham House near to Tower Hill.

== Publications ==
The ICS is also responsible for several publications in use in the marine industry, in conjunction with Witherbys. In June 2020, ICS made its maritime publications available as e-books for the first time.

In response to IMO efforts to require cyber security to be addressed under the International Safety Management Code, in November 2019, together with BIMCO and the Witherby Publishing Group, ICS published the Cyber Security Workbook for Onboard Ship Use. The second edition of the nautical workbook was published in 2021.

In May 2020, ICS issued updated health guidance for the global shipping industry to ensure ship operators and crew can safely deal with seafarers struggling with medical conditions during the COVID-19 pandemic.

In 2021, ICS produced guidance on Maritime security with a publication entitled Maritime Security - A comprehensive Guide for Shipowners, Seafarers and Administrations.

In August 2022, in partnership with Witherbys and BIMCO, ICS issued a guidance title for the shipping industry on biofouling entitled Biofouling, Biosecurity and Hull Cleaning.

In 2023, together with the Witherby Publishing Group, the organisation released an updated version of the industry publication Drug Trafficking and Drug Abuse On Board Ship. In 2024, the Chamber with Witherbys provided guidance to ships on managing the risks associated with stowaways and with rescue of displaced persons at sea. In 2025, they released an updated maritime security guide for shipowners and seafarers with Witherbys.

== See also ==
- European Community Shipowners' Associations (Brussels)
- International Maritime Organization (London; a UN organization)
