= UK Chamber of Shipping =

UK trade association

- Formation: 1878; 148 years ago
- Merger of: Shipping Federation
- Type: Trade association
- Purpose: Lobbying organisation of the UK shipping industry
- Location: London, United Kingdom
- Region served: United Kingdom
- Members: 200 companies (2024)
- President: JB Rae-Smith
- Website: ukchamberofshipping.com

The UK Chamber of Shipping is the British trade association and lobbying body for the UK shipping industry, representing around 200 member companies. It works with government, Parliament, international organisations, and other maritime stakeholders to promote and protect the interests of its members.

The organisation is one of the principal members of the International Chamber of Shipping. Their headquarters are in Park Street, London.

The body is also responsible for working with the UK government, Maritime UK and Maritime and Coastguard Agency.

== History ==
The chamber has its origins in 1878 when a national trade body for shipping was formed. The chamber was granted a royal charter in 1920 and went through several names. It merged with the Shipping Federation in 1975 and being known as the General Council of British Shipping until 1992 when its current name was adopted.

Sarah Treseder, a former Chief Executive of the Royal Yachting Association was chief executive of the chamber from 2021 to 2024, having replaced Bob Sanguinetti. In April 2024, Rear Admiral Rhett Hatcher, former UK national hydrographer and deputy chief executive at the United Kingdom Hydrographic Office became chief executive.

== Presidents ==
- 1881: Edward Stock Hill
- 1899: Honourable James Cleland Burns, Cunard Line (later Baron Inverclyde)
- 1900: William James Pirrie, Chairman of Harland & Wolff (later Viscount Pirrie)
- 1902: Colonel Sir Robert Ropner, Ropner Shipping Company
- 1903: Sir James Mackay, P&O (later Earl of Inchape)
- 2013: Helen Deeble.
- 2014: Kenneth MacLeod, Chairman of the British division of Stena Line
- 2016: Grahaeme Henderson.
- 2018: Sir Michael Bibby
- 2020: John Denholm
- 2022: Graham Westgarth
- 2024: JB Rae-Smith

== Work ==
The Merchant Navy Training Board is based at the UK Chamber's offices in London.

The UK Chamber of Shipping publishes guidance and publications for ships with Witherby Publishing Group.

The UK Chamber of Shipping hosts an annual maritime gala dinner at the JW Marriott Grosvenor Hotel in London.
