= Maritime cocaine smuggling =

Trafficking of cocaine through the sea

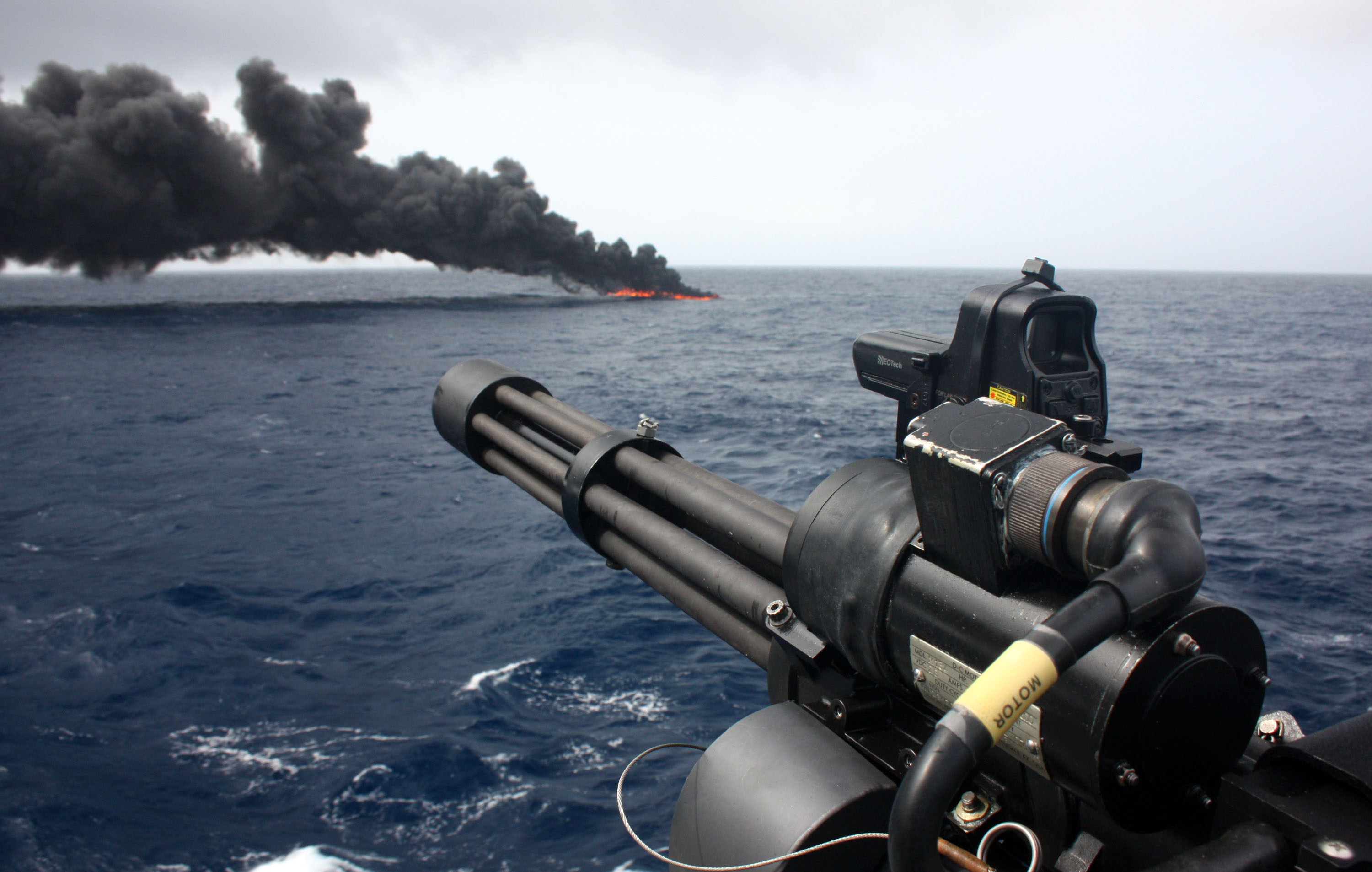
HMS Iron Duke seized £33 million of cocaine and destroyed a smuggling speedboat off the coast of South America

Maritime cocaine smuggling is the smuggling of cocaine between countries and territorial sea borders via maritime means, including boats, fishing vessels and ships. Cocaine cargoes are smuggled by various criminal groups and drug trafficking cartels from producing countries to other countries where cocaine is consumed. According to the United Nations Office on Drugs and Crime (UNODC), there are an estimated 18 million users of cocaine globally. Approximately 70–80% of cocaine is at some point smuggled across the ocean, originating from South America. Cocaine remains the "highest value criminal commodity for transnational organised crime", motivating the criminal organisations responsible for maritime smuggling practices. Maritime cocaine smuggling is therefore an ongoing international maritime security issue, characterised by continual adaptation in trafficking routes, transportation methods and concealment techniques as criminal organisations respond to changing operational conditions and law-enforcement efforts.

== Historical overview ==
Cocaine has been an illicit and abused substance for many years. Coca leaves, the source of cocaine, were previously (and still are) used in the Andes for the sole purpose of religious ceremonies. But, after the invasion of the Spanish and the exportation of coca leaves to the colonies, cocaine was used for both medicinal and recreational purposes. From the late 1800s to the early 1900s, cocaine was a popular drug widely used by the white middle-class. However, once use in society grew and the dangers of cocaine became evident, the use and sale of coca products were outlawed with the Harrison Narcotics Act in the United States in 1914, one of the first examples of drug legislation. From then on, the cocaine trade became a strictly illegal network. It was not until the 1970s that Colombian drug cartels set up their smuggling network to get cocaine into the United States.. The expansion of the cocaine trade during the 1970s also marked the beginning of large-scale maritime cocaine trafficking. As production increased in the Andean region, maritime transportation became an increasingly important means of moving cocaine to North America and, later, Europe. According to the United Nations Office on Drugs and Crime (UNODC), maritime routes continue to account for the majority of global cocaine trafficking and have become increasingly diversified as criminal organisations adapt to changing trafficking opportunities and interdiction efforts.

=== Drug cartels ===
Cocaine smuggling was previously dominated by drug cartels, particularly from Colombia. Notorious cocaine cartels such as Medellin cartel and Cali cartel have both dominated the illicit cocaine trade as well as their country of Colombia. Very early on, these cartels identified the weakness of authorities in the maritime domain and used this to their advantage. In addition to this, the lack of understanding of government administrations of the cartel structure and widespread influence has led to the speculation that this was a leading cause of the crack cocaine epidemic in the United States during the 1980s and 1990s.

The disintegration of these top cocaine cartels in Colombia in the late 1990s have paved the way for insurgent groups to take over. For example, the National Liberation Army (ELN) and the Revolutionary Armed Forces of Colombia (FARC), are both currently key actors in the cocaine trade from Colombia. While cocaine cartels are still active today, they are not as prevalent or as active as they were in the late 1900s.

=== Cocaine smuggling on the maritime security agenda ===
Cocaine smuggling has become a bigger part of maritime security as the idea of maritime security has expanded to encompass a broader range of transnational criminal activities. Although there are no clear dividing lines or exact time periods, different trends have overlapped and followed each other since the late 1990s. While the first two phases centered on maritime terrorism and piracy, respectively, the third phase expanded the maritime security agenda to encompass a broader range of so-called “blue crimes”, a term referring to harmful organized crimes or offenses happening in, on, or across the sea. It includes various crimes, such as smuggling cocaine and other drugs overseas. Since this third phase began in the early 2010s, blue crimes like cocaine smuggling have become increasingly important in maritime security, raising concerns in maritime governance.

== Key routes ==
Based on reported seizures, main cocaine trafficking routes have been mapped out by the UNODC. These routes are primarily in line with commercial shipping routes as this is one of the major methods that smugglers use to get mass amounts of cocaine across borders. The most common routes are those between Colombia and Europe, North America and Brazil (where cocaine is transhipped onwards to other countries for sale).

Key points of origin of maritime cocaine smuggling still remain to be from mainly Colombia, as well as Bolivia and Peru. From here, a large volume goes to Brazil, Mexico and Central America, the Caribbean, and Western and Central Europe. Mexico and Central America are used as transit countries for the high quantity of cocaine headed to the United States. Brazil is a major destination and transit country for cocaine smugglers and this supply goes onto Western and Central Europe, South Africa, West and Central Africa and South Asia. The Caribbean and Central America are also transit countries for the large quantity directed for Western and Central Europe. Spain is a highly used transit and destination country in Europe, which have major flows through to France, Belgium, Germany, the Netherlands and the United Kingdom. From West/Central Europe there is a medium supply of cocaine through to Eastern Europe, the Middle East and South-West Asia. Countries in West, Central and South Africa are used as a transit for the flow of cocaine to Italy in particular. Medium volumes of cocaine go directly from South America to East and South-East Asia and Oceania, Australia in particular.

Trafficking routes are not static but continue to evolve in response to changes in demand, interdiction efforts and opportunities for maritime transport. The United Nations Office on Drugs and Crime (UNODC) has observed that criminal networks regularly modify routes and transhipment points when established corridors become subject to increased law-enforcement pressure. Rather than replacing existing routes entirely, new maritime corridors often emerge alongside established ones, increasing the flexibility and resilience of maritime cocaine trafficking networks.

== Methods and techniques ==
Smuggling cocaine has become increasingly innovative as criminal organisations try to avoid detection by authorities. These methods are primarily via the maritime using maritime cargo, containers and vessels.

Most commonly, cocaine smugglers hide cocaine within other products that are arriving to another country as "commercial" products in shipping containers. Examples of this include inside concrete blocks, fruits, vehicles, in the insulation of container ships, mixing the cocaine with liquid products and soaking liquid cocaine in fabrics such as clothing.

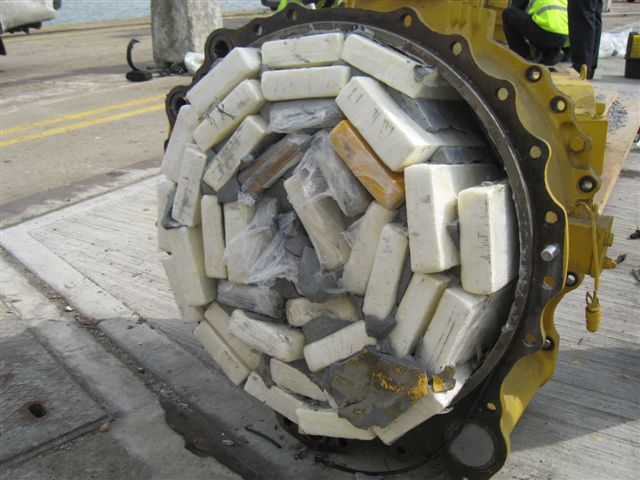
Cocaine hidden inside machinery on a ship destined for the Netherlands

Another commonality is creating an operational business to disguise the mass shipments. Notorious drug lord Joaquin 'El Chapo' Guzman is one of many who have mixed legitimate business with their drug activities to conceal their illicit trading. El Chapo opened a cannery in Mexico and began producing canned jalapeños and peppers, and stuffed them with cocaine.

Another popular smuggling technique is the "rear rip" or "rear rip-off" method. This involves the cocaine being stored in the rear door of the container so it can be quickly identified by smugglers or corrupt dock workers, and extracted before going through customs. In the ”rip-off” method, the smuggling primarily takes place without the shipper’s or consignee’s knowledge. Hereby, the legitimate shipments serve as camouflage until they arrive at the intended destination country.

== Innovation and adaptation ==
Maritime cocaine smuggling is characterised by continual adaptation in transportation methods, concealment techniques and logistics. Rather than relying on a single method of transport, trafficking organisations continuously modify existing practices and develop new ones in response to changing operational conditions, including interdiction efforts, technological developments and shifts in trafficking routes.

Research has shown that innovation in maritime cocaine smuggling is typically incremental rather than revolutionary. Instead of replacing existing trafficking methods, new transportation platforms often emerge alongside established ones, allowing criminal organisations to diversify how cocaine is transported across the maritime domain. As a result, commercial container shipping, fishing vessels, go-fast boats, self-propelled semi-submersibles, underwater cargo devices and at-sea transfer operations frequently coexist as alternative logistical solutions rather than successive stages of technological development.

Innovation is therefore not limited to the design of vessels. Criminal organisations also adapt logistics, concealment techniques and trafficking routes in response to changing operational environments, contributing to the continual diversification of maritime cocaine smuggling methods.

=== Narco-submarine ===
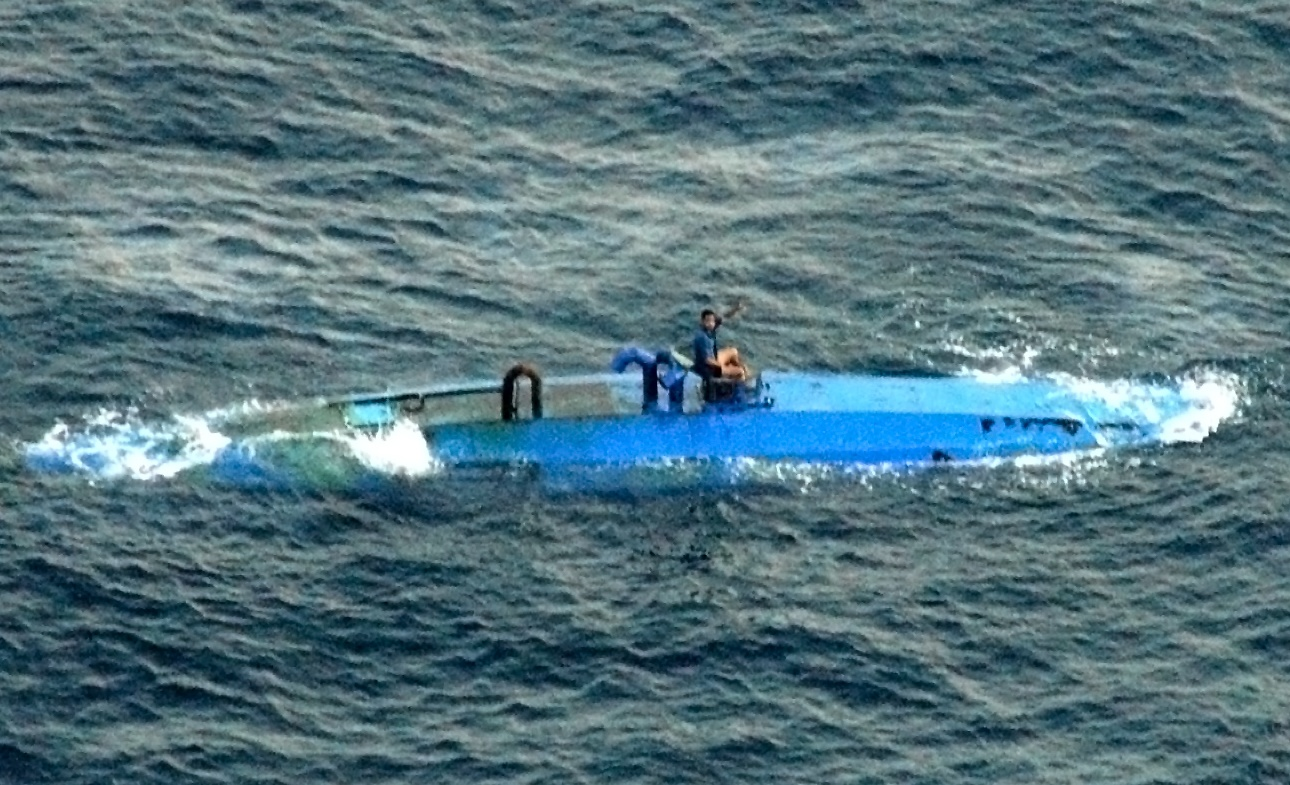
Semi-submersible vessel moments before interception by the U.S. Coast Guard in August 2007.

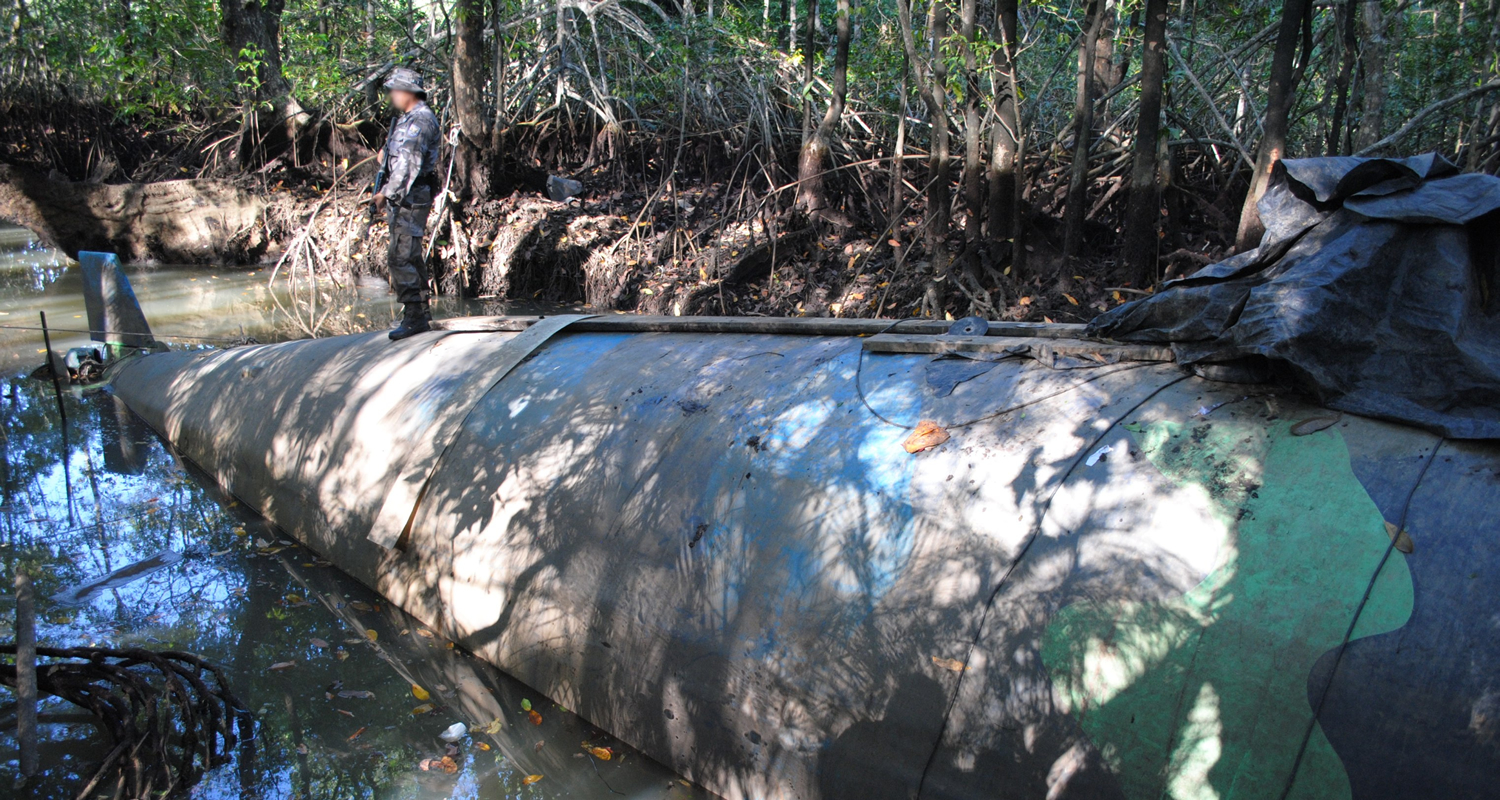
Narco submarine seized in Ecuador

Narco-submarines are a common method that cocaine smugglers use to avoid detection. These are frequently used by major Colombian cocaine smuggling organisations and are commonly referred to as the "narco submarine".

The first narco submarine was not intercepted until 2006 by the U.S. Coast Guard off of Costa Rica holding 3.5 tonnes of cocaine. Despite rumours of submarines being used by cartels in the 1990s, this was the first detection.

The number of narco submarine incidents has risen in recent years. The US Coast Guard reported 35 in 2018 and 36 in 2019. United States authorities have admitted they have no idea just how many of these narco submarines go undetected..

The development of self-propelled semi-submersibles illustrates the adaptive nature of maritime cocaine smuggling. Rather than representing a complete replacement for existing trafficking methods, semi-submersibles have developed alongside commercial shipping, fishing vessels and other maritime transportation platforms. Researchers have described their evolution as an example of incremental innovation, in which vessel designs, construction methods and operational practices are continuously modified to improve reliability and reduce the likelihood of detection.

=== Torpedo ===
In August 2005, authorities discovered an uncrewed semi-submersible in the Pacific Ocean, a "torpedo-style cargo container" (instead of a full-featured self-propelled ship). These versions use a ballast tank (submersion control) to keep them at about 30 m (98 ft) under water while towed by a fishing vessel. If a patrol ship is spotted, the "torpedo" cargo container is released. While submerged, it automatically releases a buoy disguised as a wooden log so it would be mistaken for marine debris. This log-buoy is equipped with a location transmitter system so the torpedo can be retrieved, either by the original vessel, or another vessel to retrieve it to continue the delivery. Such a log-buoy was designed to be used as a last resort; risks are involved with the deployment of said buoy:

- authorities could investigate the sudden appearance of 'marine debris'.
- authorities could notice signals from the buoy's transmission systems, then attempt to locate such signal(s). Therefore, crews in the towing boat operate under the guise of a fishing vessel to avoid suspicion, and avoiding the risks of deploying the log-buoy.

The buoy contains a mechanism to temporarily raise then lower its antenna to transmit its coordinates in encrypted form at irregular intervals. Encrypted codes are used in case of signal interception. Such an encryption could, at a minimum, delay authorities in their attempt to reach the cargo, allowing the traffickers to reach it first. This system evolved from existing buoys used on fishing nets. The buoy designers claim a near 100% shipment delivery success, and state the "torpedo" development is evolving into remote-control using encrypted signals transmitted via satellite.

=== Underwater concealment of narcotics on cargo ships ===
Underwater smuggling operations often involve divers attaching so-called "parasites"—large metal containers concealed beneath the waterline and filled with illicit substances such as cocaine—to the hulls of cargo ships. This method allows traffickers to covertly transport drugs across international borders, as the containers are difficult to detect during standard inspections. However, only relatively small quantities have been reported using this technique, usually ranging in the hundreds of kilograms, as evidenced by reported seizures of up to 200 kg in single incidents.

=== At-sea drop-offs ===
In recent years, an alternative method of maritime cocaine smuggling that has gained small but increasing prominence is the so-called at-sea drop-off method. While most of the cocaine intercepted in the maritime domain is smuggled aboard cargo vessels and enters through industrial ports, the drop-off method relies on the transfer of cocaine at sea. Criminal networks and actors involved in port security continuously adapt to one another’s practices and countermeasures. As security controls in industrial ports have intensified in response to cocaine smuggling, the use of at-sea drop-offs appears to have increased over the past decade. By transferring cocaine before the mother vessel reaches port, criminal networks can circumvent some of the controls associated with major industrial ports.

At-sea drop-offs typically involve the transfer of cocaine from a larger “mother ship” to a smaller “daughter vessel”, such as a fishing vessel, which can track the location of the dropped packages by GPS, before subsequently transporting the drugs ashore. Such transfers take place in coastal waters off both Africa and Northern Europe, with a particularly notable increase observed in the latter in recent years. The method also carries the risk of producing what can be termed “drift cocaine”, whereby criminal actors lose track of cocaine during or following an at-sea transfer, leaving it to drift at sea and potentially wash ashore. Several such incidents have occurred in recent years. In Denmark, for instance, nearly a ton of cocaine washed ashore in Sejerø Bay (Sejerøbugten) in 2024.

== The arrival in European ports ==
Ports play an important role in the overseas smuggling of cocaine. In 2022, more than 80% of the cocaine seized worldwide was intercepted in the maritime domain. Cocaine is smuggled from Latin America into Europe through industrial ports all over Europe. There is broad consensus among academic researchers, government agencies, and criminal networks that Europe's busiest port, the Port of Rotterdam, is one of the main entry points for cocaine into the European market. Other notable European ports serving as transit points for large cocaine shipments include the Port of Antwerp in Belgium, the Port of Hamburg in Germany, the Port of Marseille in France, and the Port of Piraeus in Greece. Most incoming drugs go undetected because ports offer several features that smugglers can exploit. These include their open structure, the ports’ connectivity with transport links, and increased automation. One of the most important factors that makes legal trade routes and commercial ports attractive for smuggling is the volume of containers handled at these ports. Because many legitimate goods, such as fresh food and produce, also need to pass through the ports quickly and efficiently, this limits opportunities for thorough inspections of incoming shipments. As security measures in major European ports have expanded, criminal networks have increasingly adapted their logistics rather than abandoning maritime trafficking. Europol has observed a diversification of maritime trafficking methods, with criminal organisations increasingly combining commercial shipping with at-sea transfers, non-commercial vessels, smaller regional ports and more sophisticated concealment techniques. This diversification reduces dependence on any single transportation method and increases the resilience of maritime cocaine trafficking networks.. A 2019 Europol report estimated that only between 2% and 10% of containers in Rotterdam, Antwerp, and Hamburg are physically inspected, creating a logistical structure that can be exploited by criminal organizations.

=== Corruption as an enabler for criminal infiltration of ports ===
An important part of successful cocaine smuggling is the involvement of port employees. Port employees who work with criminal networks, through collusion, coercion, or infiltration, are essential. This can include various types of port employees, such as crane operators, security personnel, customs officials, and transport company personnel. Due to their legitimate presence in the port, employees can move between different areas without necessarily attracting attention or raising suspicions. In addition, they possess information on container positions as well as departures and access to the containers themselves. Corruption is particularly useful for criminal organizations when accessing the port's entry and exit points. The main tasks of corrupt port employees in these scenarios are either sharing information or providing more direct assistance. More active forms of assistance may involve helping shipments bypass control procedures by clearing containers without inspection or by moving goods to more convenient locations for retrieval.

Recent Europol and EMCDDA assessments have also highlighted the growing role of specialised facilitators within maritime cocaine trafficking. Rather than controlling every stage of the supply chain, criminal organisations increasingly rely on networks of logistics specialists, corrupt port employees, transport companies and brokers who provide specific services within the trafficking process. This has contributed to a more flexible and decentralised maritime trafficking system.

== Key responses ==
Since 9/11, countries have shown an increased response and focus to maritime security related issues as threats to ports became a concern. This has created an increased focus and recognition of the role of the maritime in cocaine smuggling. The UNODC has been a major actor in the response to combatting maritime cocaine smuggling at an international level. The UNODC has found that corruption and weak law enforcement capacity are key factors in keeping the supply chain of cocaine smuggling resilient. The UNODC has recognised the maritime as a popular domain due to the lack of jurisdiction on the high seas. Therefore, international cooperation is the crucial tool to counter maritime cocaine smuggling based on the principle of "shared and common responsibility".

=== United States response ===
The United States government has gone for a more invasive approach to the issue of maritime cocaine smuggling. Rather than relying solely on the US Coast Guard and customs to detect cocaine being smuggling into the country, the United States government is intervening in Colombia. The United States has provided military hardware and training to the Colombian military, aiming to reduce the quantity of cocaine directed towards the United States. In addition to this, the United States government is also providing infrastructure to Colombia to assist in fighting insurgency in the country created by FARC and ELN.

=== The Port of Rotterdam ===
Being one of the largest ports in Europe, the Port of Rotterdam sees extraordinary amounts of smuggled cocaine. The high volume of shipments coming through, as well as the geographical location and access to the European market creates an appeal for cocaine smugglers. Here, a record total of 33,732 kilograms of cocaine was seized in 2019, almost doubling the previously set 2018 record amount of 19,000 kg. Fruit, especially bananas, a common Latin American export, is the most common method seen to smuggle cocaine into Europe.

The Port of Rotterdam has a specialised team of divers whose purpose is to find smuggled drugs, the Dutch Customs Diving Team (CDT). This type of border policing is done under the waterline as cocaine is not only smuggled onboard, but under vessels as well.

Although international cooperation, port security and maritime surveillance have contributed to record cocaine seizures, recent assessments suggest that trafficking organisations continue to adapt rapidly to new enforcement measures. Europol has identified increasing diversification in maritime trafficking methods, including the use of fragmented shipping routes, at-sea transfers, semi-submersibles and sophisticated concealment techniques. As a result, responses to maritime cocaine smuggling increasingly focus not only on individual seizures but also on disrupting the logistical networks that enable criminal organisations to adapt their trafficking operations.

== Notable seizures ==
Large seizures of cocaine are not only a success for local and national authorities in getting cocaine off the streets, but also prevent it from continuing the illegal supply chain to other countries.

=== United States ===
In 2019, United States customs seized 19.76 tonnes of cocaine from a ship at a Philadelphia port (estimated street value US$1.1 billion). At the time, this was the largest cocaine seizure in U.S. history.

=== Germany ===
In 2019, German authorities in Hamburg seized 1.5 tonnes of cocaine at a port in Hamburg. The cocaine was found in shipping containers containing soybeans that were concealing 221 sports bags full of cocaine. The shipping containers were from Uruguay and were bound for Antwerp, Belgium.

=== Costa Rica ===
In early 2020, police in Costa Rica found more than 5 tonnes of cocaine in a shipping container. They discovered 202 suitcases containing cocaine hidden in a consignment of flowers. The shipping containers were headed for the Netherlands. The country has seen a surge in drug smugglers using their country to move cocaine to the United States and Europe.

=== Australia ===
In 2017, an Australian Federal Police (AFP) investigation led to the seizure of 1.4 tonnes of cocaine, the largest seizure of a single cocaine shipment in Australian history. The group of men responsible travelled from New Zealand to a 'mothership' in the South Pacific Ocean on a yacht where they collected the cocaine and attempted to sail into Australia, but were intercepted on the south coast of Australia. The investigation and seizure was supported by authorities in New Zealand, Fiji and French Polynesia.

=== Ireland ===
In September 2023, the Revenue’s Customs Service, Naval Service, and An Garda Síochána detained the Panama-flagged bulk cargo vessel MV Matthew. On board the ship, 2.2 tonnes of cocaine were found and seized, with an estimated value of $165 million (2023), making it the largest drug seizure in Ireland’s history.

=== Spain ===
In 2021 former NGO vessel La Línea de la Concepción was seized by the Guardia Civil 100 Nautical miles off Huelva carrying 15 tonnes of Hashish from Morocco destined for Spain.

In October 2024 Spanish police and custom officers found 13 tonnes of cocaine in a freighter from Ecuador in the port of Algeciras. The drugs had been hidden under a shipment of bananas.

In October 2025, based on DEA information, Spanish police intercepted a freighter, which was carrying some 6.5 tonnes of cocaine, 600 Nautical miles off the Canary Islands, destined for the port of Vigo in north-west Spain. The ship came from Panama and sailed under the flag of Tanzania, the crew of nine individuals was arrested.
