= Abdullah Azzam Brigades =

Salafi Jihadist militant group

Abdullah Azzam Brigades كتائب عبد الله عزام
- Leaders: Saleh Al-Qaraawi; Majid bin Muhammad al-Majid; Surajuddin Zureiqat
- Dates active: 2009–2015
- Active regions: Middle East (primary in Lebanon)
- Ideology: Sunni Islamism; Islamic fundamentalism Salafist jihadism
- Part of: Al-Qaeda

The Abdullah Azzam Brigades (Arabic: كتائب عبد الله عزام), also formally known al-Qaeda in Lebanon, was a Sunni Islamist militant group, and al-Qaeda's branch in Lebanon. The group, which began operating in 2009, was founded by Saudi Saleh Al-Qaraawi and has networks in various countries, mainly in Egypt, Iraq, Syria, Jordan, the Gaza Strip and Lebanon.

It is named after the late Abdullah Yusuf Azzam, a Palestinian from Jordan and a well-known preacher and organizer who was among the first Arabs to volunteer to join the Afghan jihad against the forces of the then-Soviet Union in Afghanistan in the 1980s. Some other nonrelated terrorist organizations have been known to use the name "Abdullah Azzam Brigades" as a "name of convenience" for their operations.

After grave injuries Al-Qaraawi received as a result of a drone attack in Pakistan, and his eventual capture upon his return to Saudi Arabia by Saudi authorities, the leadership of the Abdullah Azzam Brigades was assumed by Majid al-Majid, a Saudi affiliated with Fatah al-Islam and al-Qaeda. Al-Majid was declared the leader and emir of the Abdullah Azzam Brigades in June 2012, until his capture by Lebanese authorities on 27 December 2013, and eventual death from kidney failure on 4 January 2014. Al-Majid was succeeded by Sirajuddin Zureiqat.

== History ==
The Abdallah Azzam Brigades was formed by the Saudi national Saleh Al-Qaraawi in 2009 as an offshoot of al-Qaeda in Iraq, and was tasked with hitting targets in the Levant and throughout the Middle East. Qaraawi is a Saudi citizen and is on the list of 85 most-wanted terrorists that was issued by the Saudi Interior Ministry in 2009. The group formally announced its establishment in a July 2009 video statement claiming responsibility for a February 2009 rocket attack against Israel.

After attacks by the Ziad al Jarrah Battalion, a Lebanese affiliate of the Abdullah Azzam Brigades, a communique was released clarifying that the Brigades operated on a wider scale. The communique said: "[The Abdullah Azzam Brigades] are not confined to Lebanon but there are targets that our fires will reach Allah-willing in the near future...the Brigades are formed of a number of groups that are spread in numerous places...and the groups of 'Ziad al-Jarrah' in Lebanon are only some of our groups, and we rushed to create these groups and announced them because of the urgency of the battle with the Jews and the priority of the initiative at the time and the place, but the rest of the groups are outside Lebanon."

In an interview to Al-Jazeera in August 2010, a Yemeni expert on Islamic movements asserted that although violent acts had been claimed by groups using Abdullah Azzam in their name, it was only in 2009 after the Gaza War that the Abdullah Azzam Brigades organization was established.

== Branches ==
The Abdullah Azzam Brigades has branches active in multiple countries:

- The Lebanese branch has used the name the Ziad al Jarrah Battalion, and is named after Lebanese 9/11 hijacker Ziad al Jarrah who participated in the hijacking and crash of United Flight 93.
- The Abdullah Azzam Brigades branch in the Arabian Peninsula calls itself the Yusuf al-’Uyayri Battalions, named after Yusef al-Ayeri, the slain founder of Al Qaeda in Saudi Arabia.
- In Gaza strip, the group had used the name Marwan Haddad division of the Abdullah Azzam Brigades in the Levant. On 10 April 2011, a Gazan group claimed responsibility for firing a Grad missile at the Israeli city of Ashkelon and two other projectiles at the Zikim military base. The group said in a statement that "operations would continue until the Palestinian land is liberated and Tawhid flag is raised."

== Aliases ==
The group has used a number of aliases including:

- Martyr Abdullah Azzam Brigades / Abdullah Azzam Shaheed Brigades / Kataeb Shuhada' Abdullah Azzam
- Al-Qaeda in Lebanon
- Abdullah Azzam Brigades of the Land of Al-Sham
- Al-Qaeda in the Levant / Al-Qaeda in the Levant and Egypt / Al-Qaida in Syria and Egypt
- Al-Qa'idah organization – The Land of Al-Sham and Al-Kinanah / Tanzim al-Qaida fi Bilad ash-Sham wa Ard al-Kinanah
- The Harakat Shabaab al-Mujahidin

== Name of convenience ==
The name has been used by other non-related organizations as a name of convenience in a number of operations and in various countries.

=== Egypt ===
Even prior to the actual formation of the organization in 2009, a group calling itself Abdullah Azzam Brigades carried out devastating attacks in 2004 in the Sinai bombings and in 2005 in Sharm el-Sheikh bombings.

- On 7 October 2004, the Sinai Peninsula Egyptian resort of Taba was subject of three terrorist attacks targeting a hotel and two tourist campsites. The Hilton Taba bombing killed 31 people and wounded some 159 others. Ten floors of the hotel collapsed following the blast. Two campsites used by Israelis at Ras al-Shitan, near Nuweiba were also attacked killing two Israelis and an Egyptian. Twelve others were wounded. The bombings were claimed by an unknown group called Abdullah Azzam Brigades. According to Egyptian authorities, this was a cover to the mastermind behind the bombings, the Palestinian Iyad Saleh. He and one of his aides, Suleiman Ahmed Saleh Flayfil died in the Hilton blast, apparently because their bomb timer had run out too fast. Three Egyptians, Younes Mohammed Mahmoud, Osama al-Nakhlawi, and Mohammed Jaez Sabbah were sentenced to death in November 2006 for their roles in the blast. According to investigators, there was no strong link to Al Qaeda in the blasts.
- On 23 July 2005, the Egyptian resort of Sharm el-Sheikh was subject to a series of bombings killing 88 people, the majority of them Egyptians, and over 200 wounded, making it the deadliest terrorist action in Egypt's modern history. A group calling itself the Abdullah Azzam Brigades was the first to claim responsibility for the attacks. On a website, the group stated that "holy warriors targeted the Ghazala Gardens hotel and the Old Market in Sharm el-Sheikh" and claimed it has ties to Al-Qaeda. The Egyptian government said that the bombers were actually Bedouin militants from the same group that carried out the Taba bombings a year earlier. Arrested suspects claimed to have been motivated by the War in Iraq.

=== Jordan ===
In 2005, again much earlier than the official formation of the organization, its name appeared in relation to a series of rocket attacks from Jordan. Several Katyusha rockets were fired from within the Jordanian territory, some hitting near the Eilat Airport and two others hitting very close to two United States Navy ships docked in Aqaba, the USS Kearsarge (LHD-3), and the USS Ashland (LSD-48). A group linked with al-Qaeda claimed to have made that attack. One of the rockets hit a Jordanian military hospital, killing a Jordanian soldier. The attack is regarded as having been perpetrated by the al-Zarqawi branch of Al Qaeda. A self-styled Abdullah Azzam Brigades also claimed responsibility.

=== Palestine ===
During the 2014 Gaza War, videos showed members of the Abdullah Azam Brigedes, who were not only present inside the Gaza Strip, but were also actively fighting against Israel in it.

=== Pakistan ===
A little-known Pakistani militant group, Fedayeen al-Islam, affiliated with Tehrik-i-Taliban Pakistan, claimed responsibility for the Pearl Continental hotel bombing in Peshawar, Pakistan. A spokesman for the group, Amir Muawiya, phoned media organizations claiming responsibility for the attack and promised more attacks were on the way. He further stated that the bombing was in retaliation for Pakistan army operations in Swat and Malakand division of the North West Frontier Province and the tribal areas of Darra Adam Khel and Orakzai Agency However, on 11 June 2009, a previously unknown group calling itself the Abdullah Azzam Shaheed Brigade claimed responsibility for the attack, saying the attack was in response to attacks by Pakistani military forces on Taliban insurgents in the Swat Valley. On 8 December, the head of the Human Rights Commission of Pakistan (HRCP), Zarteef Khan Afridi (had been working with tribal leaders to trying to pacify the region) was shot dead by armed militants in Jamrud, Khyber. The Abdullah Azam Brigade claimed the murder.

On 24 February 2012, this alleged group equipped with suicide bombers blew themselves up in an attack on a police station "C Division" in the heart of Peshawar. According to witnesses, total attackers were more than 10, armed with hand grenades and automatic weaponry with latest technology that had never been used before. Two Pakistani policemen were killed and six others injured. The Abdullah Azzam Brigade claimed responsibility for the attack. Spokesman Abu Zarar Said, speaking from an unknown location, said that the attack was a reaction to the killing of a top militant leader, Badar Mansoor, in a drone strike in Waziristan. Months later, militants ambushed a North Atlantic Treaty Organization (NATO) supply truck in Jamrud, Khyber Agency. The driver was killed and one other civilian was injured in the attack. The Abdullah Azzam Brigades claimed responsibility for the attack, threatening more attacks on drivers who provided supplies to NATO. On 16 January, explosive device blasts at a Khasadar Forces checkpoint in the Sadokhel area, Landi Kotal, Federally Administered Tribal Areas, Pakistan. At least one Khasadar officer was killed and another wounded, and the Abdullah Azzam Brigades claimed responsibility for the attack.

=== The Persian Gulf ===
There are also other operations claimed by the Brigades, but strong doubts whether they were actually involved. For example, on 3 August 2010, a man claimed to be a spokesman of the brigade made a video statement that the Brigades were involved in the attack on the Japanese oil tanker M. Star in the Strait of Hormuz in July 2010. But many analysts were skeptical about the claim that it was the Abdullah Azzam Brigades. A BBC correspondent asserted that the perpetrators were using the name as a "name of convenience".

== Syria ==
The group denied all involvement in the 23 December 2011 suicide attack in the Syrian capital that killed 40 people. The terror group accused the Syrian government of attempting to deflect attention from its brutal crackdown on protesters that has killed more than 5,000 people. In a statement released on jihadist websites on 27 December 2011, the Abdullah Azzam Brigades denied responsibility for the suicide attacks.

In a statement issued by the group's emir, Majid bin Muhammad al-Majid, in June 2012, the group acknowledged its fight against the forces of President Bashar al Assad in the Syrian Civil War. Majid recommended that the rebels avoid use of car bombs and bomb belts inside cities for fear of harming and alienating Syrian civilians. This advice is in contrast to the actions of another Salafist Jihadist group active in the Syrian Civil War, the Al-Nusra Front.

== Lebanon ==
An improvised device blasts outside of the Fakhereddine Army Barracks in Beirut, leaving one soldier wounded. A man claiming to be a member of Al-Qaida called the Lebanese newspaper Al Balad and claimed responsibility for the attack before and after the blasts.

During 2013, the group started a string of attacks. On 19 November 2013, the Brigade claimed responsibility for a double suicide bombing outside the Iranian embassy in Beirut, which killed at least 23 people and wounded over 140. The group said the bombing was retaliation for Iranian support of Hezbollah, which fights on the Syrian government's side in the current Syrian civil war, and warned of further attacks should Iran's government not acquiesce. In 23 December the Abdullah Azzam Brigades claimed a rocket attack in Hermel, Lebanon.

During the firsts weeks of 2014, Abdullah Azzam claimed a string of rocket attacks in the south of Lebanon. On 19 February 2014, the brigade carried out an attack on the Iranian Cultural Center in Beirut's southern suburb of Bir-Hasan, killing 11 and wounding 130, their motive was the support of Iran in the Syrian war. Three days later, a car bomb blasts at a Lebanese Army checkpoint on Al-Assi Bridge at the entrance to Hermel city, Beqaa Governorate. In addition to the bomber, two soldiers and one civilian, were killed and at least 15 people were wounded. The authorities blamed to the Abdullah Azzam Brigades or Al-Nusrah Front for the attack. After this attack, the group continued with its rocket attacks against israeli cities.

=== Arrest and death of Majid al-Majid ===
On 27 December 2013, Lebanese authorities captured Majid bin Mohammad al-Majid, the Saudi leader of the group. Al-Majid had undergone kidney treatment at the Makased hospital in Beirut. The hospital had released him and he had reportedly hidden in a Palestinian refugee camp of Ain al-Hilweh, near Saida. He allegedly tried to move elsewhere for more medical treatment, but was captured by the Lebanese army on the Beirut-Damascus highway.

On 3 January 2014, DNA tests confirmed that the man detained by Lebanese army intelligence is Majid al-Majid, the chief of the Abdullah Azzam Brigades. The DNA samples belonging to relatives of Majid in Saudi Arabia matched those of the suspect who remained in custody of the Lebanese Armed Forces, Lebanon's state National News Agency reported. On 4 January, Majid died of kidney failure in a military hospital in Beirut.

==== Reactions ====
- Iran Mohammad Javad Zarif, foreign minister of Iran, appreciated Government of Lebanon for arrest of Al-Majid and requested information about investigations by the Lebanese authorities with Al-Majid on the Iranian Embassy bombing.
- Saudi Arabia Adnan Mansour, foreign minister of Saudi Arabia, rejected a request by Government of Iran to participate in the investigation of Majed al-Majed.
- Abdullah Azzam Brigades said their fight will continue, with or without their leader.

== Listing as a terrorist organization ==
The Abdullah Azzam Brigades has been designated as a terrorist organization by the United Nations, Bahrain, Iraq, New Zealand, the UAE, the United Kingdom, the United States, Canada and Israel.

== Leadership ==
- Ibrahim Suleiman Hamad Al-Hablain, explosives expert.

== See also ==
- List of armed groups in the Syrian Civil War
