= Maritime security =

Umbrella term for maritime issues

Maritime security is an umbrella term informed to classify issues in the maritime domain that are often related to national security, marine environment, economic development, and human security. This includes the world's oceans but also regional seas, territorial waters, rivers and ports, where seas act as a “stage for geopolitical power projection, interstate warfare or militarized disputes, as a source of specific threats such as piracy, or as a connector between states that enables various phenomena from colonialism to globalization”. The theoretical concept of maritime security has evolved from a narrow perspective of national naval power projection towards a buzzword that incorporates many interconnected sub-fields. The definition of the term maritime security varies and while no internationally agreed definition exists, the term has often been used to describe both existing, and new regional and international challenges to the maritime domain. The buzzword character enables international actors to discuss these new challenges without the need to define every potentially contested aspect of it. Maritime security is of increasing concern to the global shipping industry, where there are a wide range of security threats and challenges. Some of the practical issues clustered under the term of maritime security include crimes such as piracy, armed robbery at sea, trafficking of people and illicit goods, illegal fishing or marine pollution. War, warlike activity, maritime terrorism and interstate rivalry (such as the Territorial disputes in the South China Sea or conflict in the Strait of Hormuz) are also maritime security concerns.

While a concern throughout history for nation states, maritime security has evolved significantly since the early 2000s, when in particular concerns over terrorist attacks on port facilities sparked interest in security in the maritime domain and led to the creation of the International Ship and Port Facility Security Code. The ISPS Code is enforced through Chapter XI-2 of the SOLAS Convention. Most littoral states and international organisations have also outlined maritime security strategies. It is in particular piracy in Southeast Asia, off the coast of Somalia and in West Africa which has triggered recognition for the detrimental effects of maritime insecurities for economic development, human security as well as the environment. Maritime security is often transnational and goes beyond the maritime domain itself (see liminality). It is characterized as being cross-jurisdictional and/or highly jurisdictionally complex.

== History of maritime security ==
Historically, the sea has been subject to different concepts of law and power. The term mare nostrum (our sea in Latin) was coined by the Romans in 30 BC to 117 AD as a term to describe its control of the Mediterranean Sea. From this concept of the sealing of a sea, the legal concept of mare clausum (closed sea in legal Latin) was developed during the age of discovery between the 15th and 17th century. The sea became a restricted space, organised between Portugal and Spain. Maritime activity was exclusively reserved for the enhancement of national security through naval military. In 1609, Hugo Grotius, a Dutch philosopher and jurist, published the book mare liberum where he introduced the concept of the free sea (mare liberum is translated to free sea in legal Latin). In his book, Grotius laid out the foundation of the freedom of navigation at sea. The sea was seen as international territory, where every nation was free to conduct trade.

Grotius’ concept of the free sea was superseded by the United Nations Convention on the Law of the Sea (UNCLOS). This international agreement first came into effect in 1958 as the Convention on the High Seas (UNCLOS I). The most recent agreement is UNCLOS III, which is active since 1994. It now includes various zones and jurisdictions, including internal, territorial, and archipelagic waters. It further defines the exclusive sovereign waters of a state called contiguous zone, and the exclusive economic zones (EEZs) in which a state has the sole exploitation rights of resources like oil and fish. The latter can be extended by the continental shelf, a natural prolongation of the territory of the respective state. Maritime security has until then been mostly concerned with interstate naval conflicts and piracy at sea.

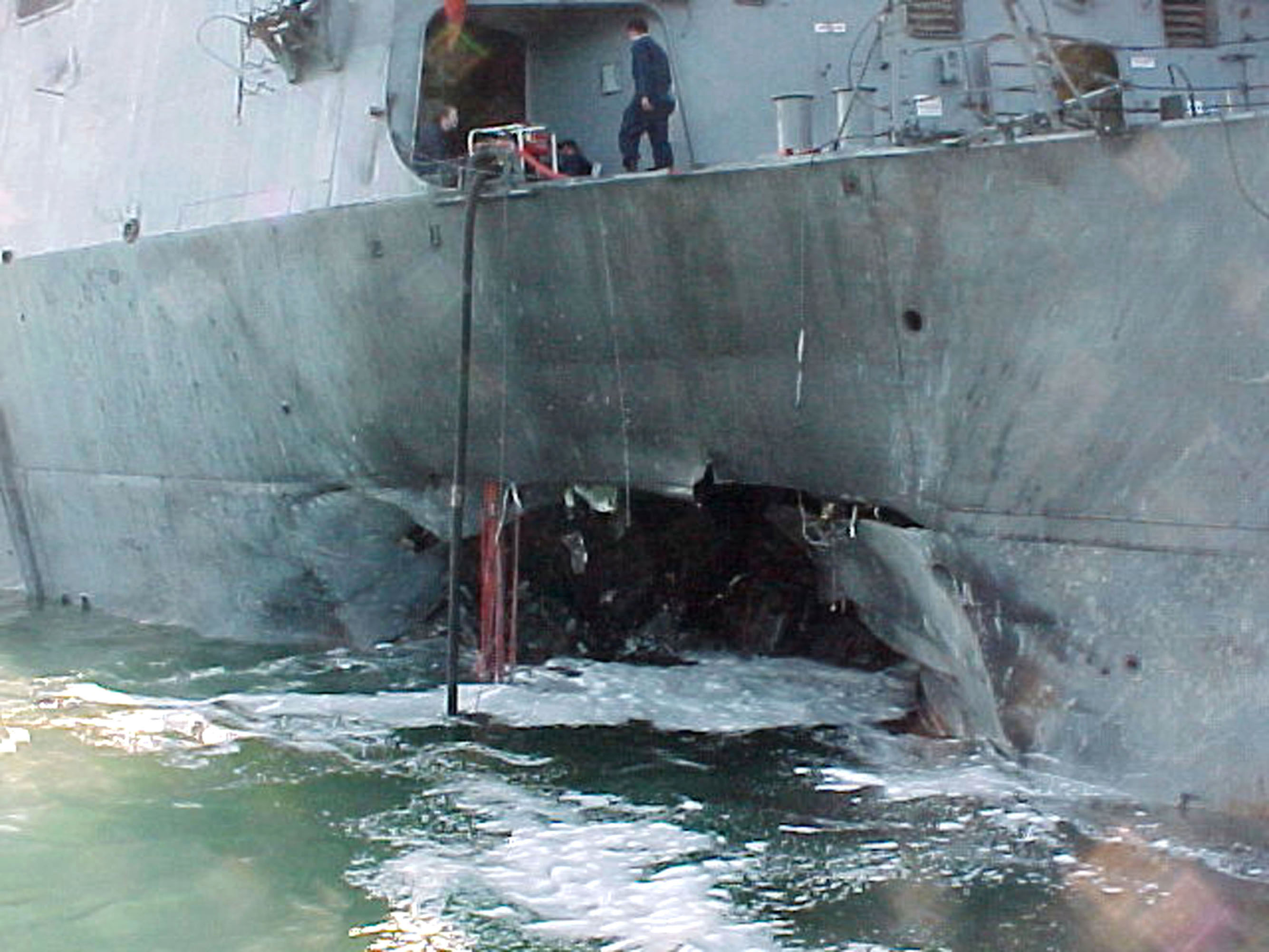
The warship USS Cole after an attack in October 2000 while she was being refueled in Aden harbour, Yemen

As a concept and agenda maritime security has evolved since the late 1990s and early 2000s. In particular concerns over terrorist attacks on port facilities sparked new security interests in the maritime domain. Notable events influencing the maritime security paradigm are the USS Cole bombing in 2000 and the September 11 attacks in 2001. Several states and international organisations have since outlined maritime security strategies. Many best practices and standards regarding physical maritime security like the ISPS Code from 2002 as a consequence of the attacks have been published by regulating authorities or the maritime industry. In the light of the perceived terrorist threat, the scope of the maritime security concept began to broaden from the narrow focus on interstate military confrontation to include other issues. (See also critical security studies)

It is in particular the surge of piracy during the early 2000s in Southeast Asia, off the coast of Somalia and in West Africa which has triggered recognition for the detrimental effects of maritime insecurities. As a result of the economic costs for world trade and the physical threats to seafarers, maritime security gained a significant increase of attention by the shipping industry, insurers and policy makers around the world. Piracy was also the starting point of many international relations scholars for approaching maritime security as a concept. In the wake of the Mumbai Terrorist attack in November 2008, an Indian scholar even lamented the serious lack of maritime vision in his government's policies to preserve India's expanding interests, thereby coining the catch-phrase "sea-blindness".

One effect of piracy has been the development of regional cooperation initiatives. In Southeast Asia for example, the Regional Cooperation Agreement on Combating Piracy and Armed Robbery against Ships in Asia (ReCaap) has been initiated in 2004 and includes now an Information Sharing Centre (ISC). Besides maritime domain awareness (MDA) more topics began to become subject of these cooperation initiatives. The International Maritime Organization Djibouti Code of Conduct (DCoC), adopted in 2009, was originally an agreement on cooperation between East African and Southwest Asian states to counter piracy. Since its revision and the complementary Jeddah Amendment to the DCoC of 2017, it now also includes other illicit maritime activities than piracy like human trafficking or illegal, unreported and unregulated fishing (IUU).

== Regulatory environment ==
Maritime security is facilitated at sea and in ports by several international regulations and codes from the International Maritime Organization. The primary Code is the International Ship and Port Facility Security Code which entered into force in 2004. The United Nations Convention on the Laws of the Sea (UNCLOS) which took place in 1984 gives a framework to piracy prohibition. Since 2008, the United Nations Security Council edited some Resolutions concerning the specific Somali case like for example the 1846th in 2008 and the 1918th in 2010, in order to make member countries put piracy as a penal crime in their domestic legislation. Those resolutions were ratified, but despite ratification, few countries have applied that resolution in their domestic law. In 2011, NATO put the maritime security issue in its Alliance Maritime Strategy objectives.

Despite the few countries who applied UN resolutions focused on Somalia piracy in their national legislation, many have created national agencies or bureaus specialized in maritime Security, like the Pakistan Maritime Security Agency in Pakistan. The first country to put the problem on their agenda were the United States in 2004 with the Maritime Security Policy. It marked the beginning of United States' Maritime Security Operations, some maritime military actions other than wars, charged to detect and prevent illicit operations.

== Practical issues of maritime security ==
=== Piracy and armed robbery ===
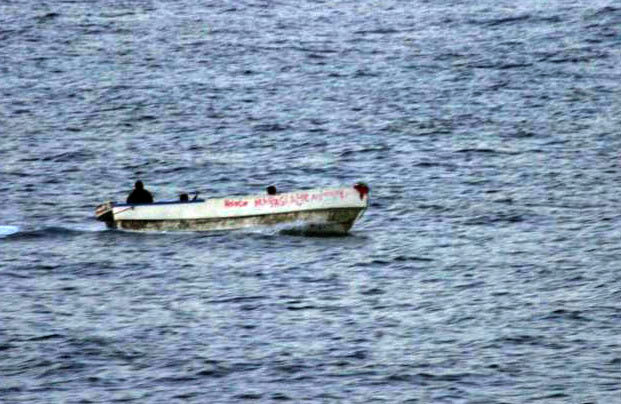
Armed pirates in the Indian Ocean near Somalia (see engaged pirate vessels).

Piracy and armed robbery remains an ongoing issue in maritime security. The ICC International Maritime Bureau (IMB) Piracy and Armed Robbery report states that attacks against ships and their crews have risen in 2019/2020. They identify that the Gulf of Guinea off West Africa is increasingly dangerous for commercial shipping, accounting for just over 90% of maritime kidnappings worldwide. However, the report noted that the number of ship hijackings in the first half of 2020 was at their lowest level since 1993. In total, IMB's Piracy Reporting Centre (PRC) recorded 98 incidents of piracy and armed robbery in the first half of 2020, up from 78 in Q2 2019. Some areas of Southeast Asia, including the Straits of Malacca and the Celebes Sea are also areas where piracy and armed robbery take place at sea, although in most cases, armed robbery is the most prevalent.

The West Indian Ocean is an area with maritime security concerns for shipping and governments. Somali piracy started to increase in the early 2000s, after a civil war affected the area. Between 2008 and 2013, large numbers of attacks against merchant ships in the Indian Ocean occurred, gaining international attention. This eventually led to the privatisation of maritime security as an increasing number of shipping companies hired private maritime security companies to protect their crews, ships and cargoes (known as 'Privately Contracted Armed Security Personnel or PCASP)'. This development affects governments, navies and other security agencies because it is a form of privatised security, one of the core functions of modern states. The maritime industry has developed an ISO certification (ISO 28007:2015) for the provision of privately contracted armed security personnel on board ships. The presence of PCASPs on ships creates complex legal issues and in most cases, permission must be given from the ship's flag State before armed personnel can attend the vessel and this usually involves confirming Rules for the Use of Force (RUF).

=== Terrorism ===
Maritime terrorism refers to terrorism carried out in the maritime domain. There is no universally agreed definition, in part because there is no agreed definition of terrorism itself.

One commonly used definition from the Council for Security Cooperation in the Asia Pacific (CSCAP) Working Group describes maritime terrorism as terrorist acts and activities conducted within the maritime environment, using or against vessels or fixed platforms at sea or in port, or against passengers, personnel, coastal facilities or settlements.

Maritime terrorism is frequently confused with piracy. The two may involve similar tactics, including hijacking and hostage-taking, but they are generally distinguished by motive. Piracy is undertaken for private gain, whereas terrorism pursues political or ideological objectives. The is important because measures developed to counter piracy do not necessarily address terrorism

Maritime terrorism accounts for a small proportion of recorded terrorist activity. Historical data from the RAND Terrorism Database has placed maritime incidents at approximately two per cent of international terrorist attacks over a thirty-year period. The rarity has been attributed to the specialised skills and equipment required to operate at sea, the availability of more accessible targets on land, and the lower visibility of attacks occurring away from urban areas.

Prominent maritime terrorism incidents include the 1961 hijacking of the Santa Maria, the 1985 hijacking of the Achille Lauro, the 2000 USS Cole bombing, and the 2010 bombing og the M.V. M. Star. The 2004 bombing of MV SuperFerry 14 in the Philippines, caused the largest loss of life in a maritime terrorist attack, with 116 people killed. The hijacking of the Achille Lauro led to the adoption of the Convention for the Suppression of Unlawful Acts against the Safety of Maritime Navigation, which establishes offences relating to the safety of navigation, including the seizure of a ship by force, acts of violence against persons on board, and the placing of devices likely to destroy or damage a ship.

Concern over maritime terrorism attacks on shipping and port facilities following the September 11 attacks contributed to the adoption of the International Ship and Port Facility Security Code. The Code sets requirements for security assessments, approved security plans, and designated security officers on ships and in port facilities. It applies to ships engaged on international voyages, and the port facilities serving them.

=== Smuggling and drug trafficking ===
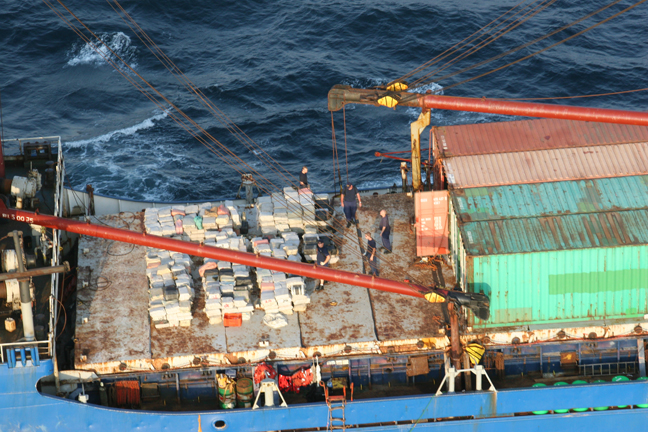
Panamanian ship Gatun following seizure of 20 tons of cocaine by the United States Coast Guard.

The illegal drug trade and trafficking of other prohibited items such as weapons is a key issue that affects global maritime security. In particular, Maritime drug trafficking in Latin America is the primary mean of transportation of illegal drugs produced in this region to global consumer markets, primarily in the form of Maritime cocaine smuggling from the Andean region of South America. The smuggling of drugs through the sea is a security problem for all the countries of the Latin American region. Drug trafficking organizations have developed various complex systems for the transportation and distribution of illegal drugs, where several countries in the region serve as points of contact for the distribution of illegal products, with an estimated 90% of the cocaine produced in the Andean region transported at some point by sea.

Smuggling also includes legally allowed items brought in without declaration to avoid customs charges, such as tobacco. This poses issues for maritime security, as often the smuggling of such items is connected to organised crime. The smuggling of drugs through the sea is a security problem for all the countries of the Latin American region.

While traffickers sometimes make use of narco submarines to transport drugs, the primary method of transfer is utilising existing commercial shipping, either hidden on board or placed within legitimate cargoes such as containers. Large ships present organised criminals with the opportunity to transport high volumes of drugs from producing to consuming countries. The volume of illegal drugs being moved in commercial shipping continues to increase and therefore the risk to ships and ports continues to increase, with ships’ crews often unaware that their ship or its cargo are being used as a cover to transport illegal drugs. However, if illegal drugs are found on board by local customs or law enforcement agencies, innocent companies and seafarers may potentially be exposed to huge financial fines or penalties, or even the risk of imprisonment.

=== Unsafe mixed migration at sea ===
Issues such as war, political instability, famine and poverty have resulted in many thousands of people travelling by sea to find better conditions of living. This migration poses several potential security concerns for coastal States, including the safety and legal issues arising from Illegal immigration but also the related criminal aspects of exploitation and human trafficking. Geographic areas principally include the Mediterranean Sea, the Horn of Africa, Southeast Asia and the Caribbean.

Since the beginning of the European migrant crisis in 2015, the effects of unsafe mixed migration on maritime security have been shown by both the number of ships arriving from Africa to the European coast (demonstrating the permeability of Europe's maritime borders) but also by the visible humanitarian consequences of vessels transporting migrants sinking, leading to deaths at sea.

For shipping, Stowaways remaining a practical security concern while at ports and anchorages. However, the presence of stowaways also presents complex legal issues, involving refugees, the shipping company, ship and ship's crew, as well as the flag State of the ship and the Port State.

=== Port security ===
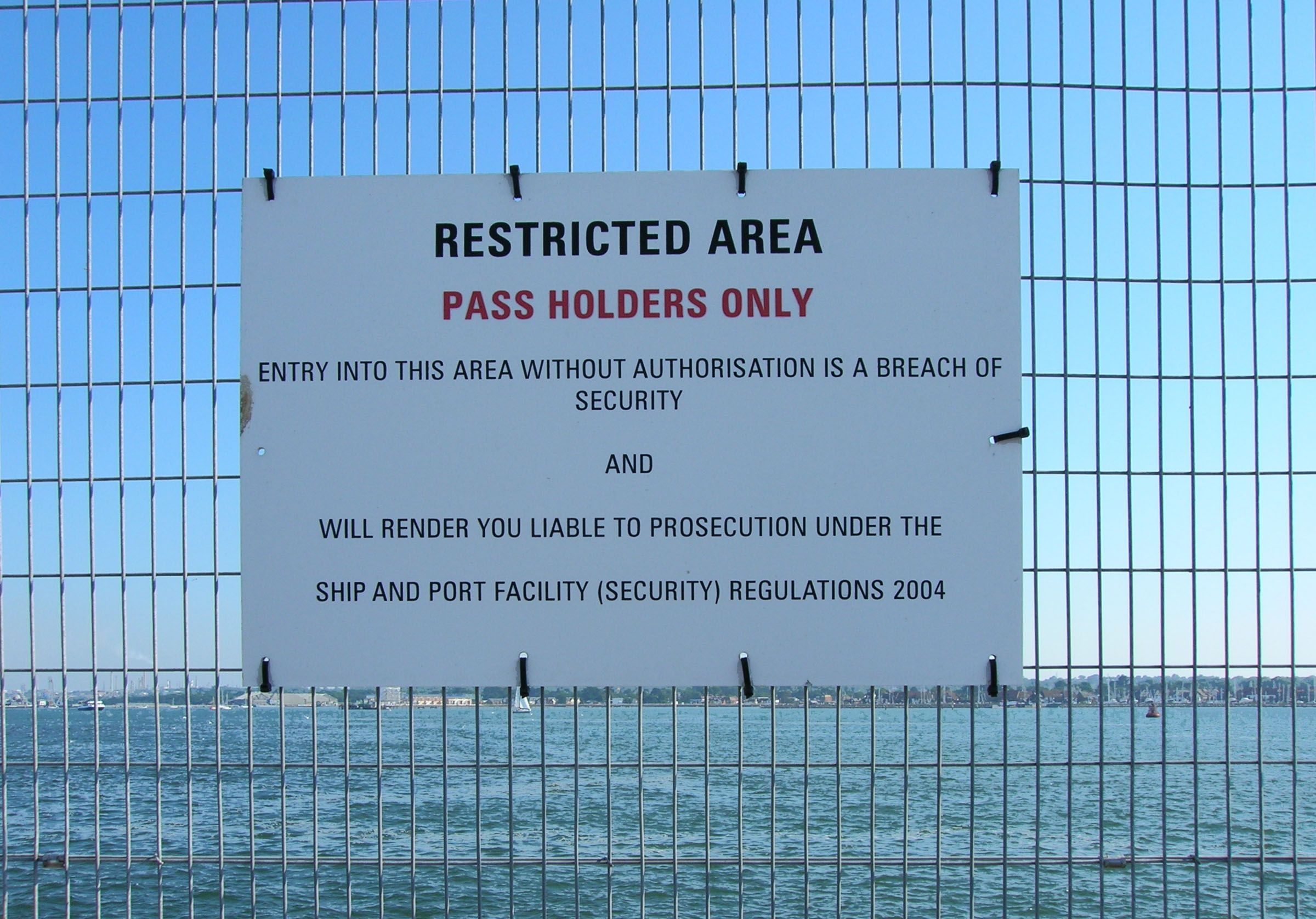
Security signage indicating ISPS Code access requirements in the port of Southampton

Port security is part of a broader definition concerning maritime security and refers to the defence, law and treaty enforcement, and counterterrorism activities that fall within the port and surrounding maritime area. It includes the protection of the seaports themselves and the protection and inspection of the cargo moving through the ports. Security risks related to ports often focus on either the physical security of the port, or security risks within the maritime supply chain.

=== Interstate conflict ===
Interstate dispute is a core dimension of maritime security and can be described as a hostile and conflictual relationship between two or more states. Interstate dispute arises due to strategic competition over access and capacity to “to utilise the seas for commercial and military purposes, or to prevent others from doing so”. Interstate disputes vary in nature, scope and severity, yet interstate dispute is always politically motivated and concerns the interests of states’. The concept can be divided into three main categories of disputes; 1) Functional disputes over physical properties and resources at sea, 2) Institutional disputes over territorial boundaries and 3) symbolic disputes over cultural and political values that states attach to the maritime domain.

A present case of interstate rivalry is between the US, India and China in the Western Indian Ocean. The US used to be the dominant naval force in the region, yet this is changing and today the three states are competing over economic influence, extractive resources and military strength in the region. Where the US used to be the dominant security provider of crucial SLOCs in the region India and China are both vying for similar positions today. The increased tensions between have led to increased naval presence and an increasing number of military exercises, which risks intensifying military competition in the region and thus decreasing maritime security in the Western Indian Ocean.

=== War/Warlike Risks ===
Armed conflict is an area of maritime security, both in the risks for shipping and users of the sea, but also in the wider context of maritime conflict and Naval warfare. War like risks are of increasing concern for maritime users and governments in areas such as the Persian Gulf. Strait of Hormuz and Southern Red Sea Region where conflicts such as the Yemen Conflict and international events such as the ongoing 2019–2021 Persian Gulf crisis continue to poses maritime security concerns.

=== Cyber Security ===
Owing to the increased technology and connectivity on modern ships in the 21st century, cyber security has become a maritime security concern. Cyber Security has come under increased focus in the maritime industry since the IMO required cyber security to be addressed under the International Safety Management Code of ships from 1 January 2021.

There are significant cyber security gaps on ships. These are due to a lack of awareness from ship operators and seafarers. Also, navigation equipment such as ECDIS, GPS, AIS, RADAR can be compromised.

== Theoretical approaches to maritime security ==
=== Realist’ approach to maritime security ===
In the traditional realist school of thought of international relations, maritime security is mainly regarded as a matter of sea power (also command of the sea). In peacetime, sea power is associated with countries securing the ability to conduct transport and trade via the sea. In wartime, sea power describes the agency of navies to attack other navies or other countries sea transportation means.

One more recent definitions in realist’ thinking sees maritime security as “The protection of a state’s land and maritime territory, infrastructure, economy, environment and society from certain harmful acts occurring at sea”. Some scholars then argue that maritime security can be classified into two different types, ‘soft’ and ‘hard’ security.

‘Hard’ maritime security signifying sea power and domination of the sea and ‘soft’ maritime security being used for threats concerning “ocean resources, transportation and trade, and exchange of information”.

A number of constructivist’ scholars have criticised this approach to maritime security where defining what a maritime security issue actually is, often becomes a collection of topics associated with threats in the maritime domain. The US Naval Operations Concept from 2006 for example listed “ensuring the freedom of navigation, the flow of commerce and the protection of ocean resources, as well as securing the maritime domain from nation-state threats, terrorism, drug trafficking and other forms of transnational crime, piracy, environmental destruction and illegal seaborne immigration” as the goal of maritime security.

=== Liberalist’ approach to maritime security ===
Central to the liberal school of thought approach in international relations to maritime security is the regulation of the maritime domain. Some legal scholars have defined maritime security as a “stable order of the oceans subject to the rule of law at sea”. The liberalist’ approach emphasises that international law has been a means to transform the traditional way of countries power projection on the sea through their navies towards a cooperation in order to achieve common goals. The focus of the liberal paradigm has been criticised as being mainly limited to technicalities and formalities of international law, but not helping understanding the governance aspects of maritime security that go beyond legal and normative regulation.

However, it has also been pointed out that the liberalist approach is a much better reflection of reality than the highly theoretical constructivist approach, explained in detail below. Dirk Siebels, an expert on maritime security, has explained that regional agreements between governments are generally needed to define maritime security – or good order at sea – for the respective region. Governments in West Africa, Southeast Asia, Europe or other regions may have different priorities, “yet it is their order, defined in negotiations and in line with international law”.

=== Constructivist’ approach to maritime security ===
Constructivism is based on the notion, that security is a socially constructed concept. Rather than accepting maritime security as a given list of threats and means, the constructivist school of thought is interested in looking at the relations and how the concept of maritime security comes to be through actions, interactions and perceptions. Constructivists’ look at how different understandings of maritime security are informed by different political interests and normative understandings.

Professor Christian Bueger has proposed three frameworks for how to deconstruct concepts of maritime security by various actors: the maritime security matrix that helps conceptualise relations, the securitization framework that looks at claims that are being made in relation to maritime security, and practice theory to analyse what is actually being done in the name of maritime security.

==== Maritime security matrix ====
The maritime security matrix looks at the semantic relations between maritime security and other maritime concepts (see also semiotics) using four dimensions to relate and situate maritime security topics in and to the general concept of ‘maritime security’:

- Marine environment (e.g. connected to marine safety)
- Economic development (e.g. connected to blue economy)
- National security (e.g. connected to seapower)
- Human security (e.g. connected to human trafficking)

A matrix may have each concept in a corner of a square, maritime security being situated in the centre. Depending on what is being analysed, concepts like human trafficking can then be situated e.g. between ‘maritime security’, ‘human security’, and ‘economic development’.

==== Securitization framework ====
Securitization is a framework of international relations originally developed by Ole Wæver and Barry Buzan. Sometimes called the Copenhagen School, securitization looks at who is making claims (using some form of language) in the name of security to carryout measures that would otherwise not easily be justified and accepted.

==== Practice theory ====
The framework of practice theory enables to analyse what kind of activities are actually conducted in the name of security. Practice in this theory is seen as patterns of doing and saying things that lead to the implementation of maritime security measures. According to Bueger five practices fit within the conventional spectrum of maritime security:

- Maritime domain awareness (MDA, see also Information Sharing Centre (ISC))
- Activities at sea (e.g. patrols, inspections, exercises)
- Law enforcement activities (e.g. arrests, trials and prosecutions)
- Coordination activities (e.g. forums, conferences, harmonizing legal frameworks)
- Naval diplomacy (e.g. capacity building, warfare) This type of activity might not be associated with maritime security, but rather with war or other related concepts.

These activities can be seen through two different perspective. The focus can either be laid on what activities belong to the everyday routine of maritime security actors or on the measures that are done in exceptional circumstances.

== Maritime security and climate change ==
=== Climate change as a maritime-security issue ===
Climate change, biodiversity loss and marine environmental degradation are increasingly discussed as maritime-security issues. The ocean has absorbed approximately 90 per cent of the excess heat generated by global warming, contributing to higher ocean temperatures, marine heatwaves, melting ice, sea-level rise and ocean acidification. These changes affect marine ecosystems, coastal communities and populations dependent on fisheries and other marine resources. Ocean health is therefore connected to food security, economic security, human security and the habitability of coastal regions.

Climate change differs from threats such as piracy, terrorism and smuggling because it is cumulative, transboundary and cannot be attributed to a single hostile actor. Environmental change may alter fish stocks, damage coastal livelihoods and increase competition for marine resources. Sea-level rise also threatens ports, coastal settlements and other maritime infrastructure. It may create uncertainty concerning maritime boundaries because coastal baselines are used to establish territorial seas and exclusive economic zones. In the Arctic, declining sea ice may open new shipping routes and improve access to natural resources, creating economic opportunities alongside environmental risks and geopolitical competition.

=== Blue acceleration ===
The blue acceleration is the rapid expansion of human activity in the ocean over recent decades. It encompasses the growing use of marine food, materials and space through activities such as shipping, industrial fishing, aquaculture, offshore energy production, submarine cables, tourism and prospective seabed mining.

The expansion of maritime activity has created economic opportunities while also increasing congestion, competition for resources, pollution, greenhouse-gas emissions and pressure on marine ecosystems. The International Maritime Organization's Fourth Greenhouse Gas Study reported that total shipping emissions increased from 977 million tonnes of carbon-dioxide equivalent in 2012 to 1,076 million tonnes in 2018, an increase of 9.6 per cent. Shipping's share of global anthropogenic emissions rose from 2.76 to 2.89 per cent during the same period. Although the carbon intensity of international shipping improved, total emissions increased as maritime activity continued to grow.

Blue acceleration connects climate change and ocean health directly to maritime security. Greater maritime activity can contribute to greenhouse-gas emissions, pollution, habitat degradation and the overexploitation of marine resources. These pressures can weaken the ocean's capacity to provide food, employment, climate regulation and coastal protection. Their effects on food security, livelihoods, health and the safety of coastal populations make human security a component of maritime security rather than a separate concern.

From this broader perspective, maritime security concerns the conditions required for people to use and depend on the ocean safely. It includes the protection of vessels, ports, trade routes and offshore infrastructure, as well as responses to climate change and marine environmental degradation. The concept of blue acceleration therefore illustrates how increasing activity at sea can simultaneously create economic opportunities, damage ocean health and produce security risks for ocean-dependent communities.

=== International environmental agreements ===
The Kunming–Montreal Global Biodiversity Framework, adopted in 2022, includes a target to effectively conserve and manage at least 30 per cent of coastal and marine areas by 2030. This is commonly known as the 30×30 target.

The Biodiversity Beyond National Jurisdiction Agreement (BBNJ Agreement), also known as the High Seas Treaty, was adopted in 2023 and entered into force on 17 January 2026. It establishes an international framework for the conservation and sustainable use of marine biodiversity in areas beyond national jurisdiction. Its provisions address marine protected areas, environmental impact assessments, marine genetic resources and benefit-sharing, and capacity-building and technical assistance.

Bueger and Edmunds describe a paradox between the increasing number of marine environmental initiatives and the fragmented institutions responsible for implementing them. Environmental agreements and marine protected areas may require surveillance, enforcement and maritime law-enforcement capacity, but these requirements are not always sufficiently connected to environmental governance. This raises questions about the practical viability and long-term effectiveness of environmental measures.
