= UK P&I Club =

Marine mutual liability insurer

The UK P&I Club is a marine mutual liability insurer in the United Kingdom providing P&I insurance for the global shipping industry. The UK P&I Club is one of the 12 members of the International Group of P&I Clubs. The club is one of the largest of the global P&I Clubs and in 2002 covered more than 100 million tons across 6,000 ships. In 2019, the Club provided insurance for over 144 million gross tons of merchant shipping.

== History ==
The UK P&I Club was founded as the United Kingdom Mutual Steam Ship Assurance Association. In 1886, Thomas Miller, took over the management of the club and the company Thomas Miller still manages the UK P&I Club as of 2023.

In 2018, the insurer began the process of setting up a subsidiary in Rotterdam as a result of the Brexit.

The club is responsible for the Protection and Indemnity (third party) liabilities insurance coverage for the container ship Ever Given that grounded and blocked the Suez Canal in 2021. The club was responsible for reaching an agreement regarding costs with the Suez Canal Authority to allow the vessel to sail in June 2021.

== Publications ==
Together with Witherbys, the UK P&I Club publishes the marine reference book Carefully to Carry, which contains guidance on the safe carriage, loading and storage of cargo on cargo ships.

The club also provide a series of risk awareness guides for the maritime industry covering different ship types.

In September 2021, with CAE and Witherbys, the club launched a safety publication entitled Maritime Team Dynamics, a safety book comparing aviation and maritime incidents.
