= Helen Deeble =

British Business Woman

Helen Deeble CBE is a British businesswoman. She was the Chief Executive of P&O Ferries until December 2017, and was formerly President of the UK Chamber of Shipping.

== Career ==
Mrs Deeble trained as an accountant and worked at Sears plc. She entered the shipping industry at Stena Line in 1993, becoming finance director of the merged P&O Stena Line in 1998. Since May 2006, she has been Chief Executive of P&O Ferries, succeeding Russ Peters.

She is a board member of Interferry, the UK Chamber of Shipping and the Standard P&I Club. Deeble is a non-executive director of the Port of London Authority and chairs the management committee of the Authority's pension fund. She was vice-president and president of the UK Chamber of Shipping from 2011 to 2013.

She was appointed Commander of the Order of the British Empire (CBE) in the 2013 New Year Honours.

Business positions
Preceded by Russ Peters	CEO of P&O Ferries; 2006–2017	Succeeded by Incumbent
