= Grahaeme Henderson =

British engineer and maritime executive

Grahaeme Henderson OBE, FREng
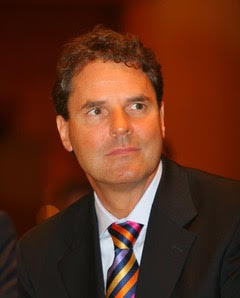
- Born: United Kingdom
- Occupations: Engineer, maritime executive
- Awards: Officer of the Order of the British Empire (2020); Fellow of the Royal Academy of Engineering (2022)

Academic background
- Education: University of Southampton (BSc, PhD)

Grahaeme Henderson OBE, FREng is a British engineer and maritime executive. He held senior positions at Shell plc over a career spanning more than 40 years, including serving as Senior Vice President for Shipping and Maritime from 2011 to 2021.

He has been involved in industry-wide efforts to improve maritime safety, decarbonisation and sustainability, including serving as chair of the Oil Companies International Marine Forum and President of the UK Chamber of Shipping.

Henderson is an Adjunct Professor at the Southampton Marine and Maritime Institute, University of Southampton. In 2017, he was listed among the top 10 most influential people in the shipping industry by Lloyd's List.

== Early life and education ==
Henderson attended Isleworth Grammar School before studying at the University of Southampton, where he obtained a First Class Honours BSc degree and a PhD in numerical modelling of sea waves.

== Career ==
=== Shell ===
Henderson joined Shell in the early 1980s and worked in various international roles over a 40-year career. His overseas assignments included postings in Brunei, Nigeria, Syria, and the Netherlands. He held both technical and leadership roles, including Chief Engineer of Shell Petroleum Development Company in Nigeria and Engineering Manager for Al Furat Petroleum, a joint venture with the Syrian Petroleum Company. He also served as Chief Information Officer for Shell Upstream in the Netherlands.

From 2005 to 2011, he was the CEO of Brunei Shell Petroleum, one of the largest private oil and gas companies in Southeast Asia. During this time, he also served on the Brunei Economic Development Board by appointment of Sultan Hassanal Bolkiah.

In 2011, Henderson became senior vice president of Shell Shipping and Maritime. This role also included the merger of BG Group with Shell.

=== Academic and industry collaboration ===
In 2015, Henderson was appointed adjunct professor at the Southampton Marine & Maritime Institute (SMMI) at the University of Southampton.

From 2014 to 2018, Henderson was chair of the Oil Companies International Marine Forum (OCIMF). He was president of the UK Chamber of Shipping between 2016 and 2018. He was a member of the World Economic Forum’s Global Agenda Council for the Oceans.

Henderson is the founder and chair of Together in Safety, a global maritime safety initiative that brings together shipping industry bodies, companies, insurers, classification societies, flag states and governments, aiming to reduce fatalities and serious incidents in shipping.

== Recognition ==
- Lloyd’s List Top 100 People in Global Shipping (2017), ranked #9
- 2022 Fellow of the Royal Academy of Engineering
- Appointed Officer of the Order of the British Empire (OBE) in the 2020 Birthday Honours for services to international shipping.
- Honorary Doctor of Science, University of Southampton, 2018
