= Saleh Al-Qaraawi =

Leader of Al-Qaeda in Lebanon

- Press photo/Mugshot of Saleh al-Qaraawi after he confessed to crimes.
- Born: 15 November 1982 (age 44); Buraydah, Saudi Arabia
- Occupation: Militant
- Military career
- Allegiance: Al-Qaeda: Al Qaeda central (2000–2015); Al-Qaeda in Iraq (2003–2006); Islamic State of Iraq (2006–2009); Abdullah Azzam Brigades (2009–2012)
- Service years: 2000–2015
- Rank: Fighter in Afghanistan (?–?) Commander in Iraq (2003–2009) Emir of Al-Qaeda in Lebanon (2009–2012)
- Conflicts: War in Afghanistan (1978–present) 2014 Israel–Gaza conflict Iraq War

Saleh Al-Qaraawi (Arabic: صالح القرعاوي) is a Saudi militant and founder of the Abdullah Azzam Brigades.

== Background ==
Al-Qaraawi fought in the Iraqi Insurgency alongside Al Qaeda in Iraq leader Abu Musab al-Zarqawi. He was a founder of the militant Abdullah Azzam Brigades in 2009, which has carried out a number of attacks in the Middle East. He was identified as the leader of Al Qaeda in Saudi Arabia by Saudi Arabian security officials in a 3 February 2009 list of their 85 most wanted.

In December 2011, the US State Department listed him as a Specially Designated Global Terrorist.

Al-Qaraawi was arrested on 9 June 2012 after returning to Saudi Arabia from Pakistan where he had been wounded in a drone strike.
