= MV M. Star =

Oil tanker attacked in 2010

History

Marshall Islands
- Completed: 2008
- Status: In service

General characteristics
- Type: Crude oil tanker
- Tonnage: 270,204 DWT; 160,292 GT
- Length: 333.00 m (1,092 ft 6 in)
- Crew: 31

M. Star is a VLCC oil tanker operated by the Japanese company Mitsui O.S.K. Lines. It was launched in December 2008 and gained international media attention in 2010, when an explosion occurred on board. There was speculation to the cause of the explosion but it was later claimed as a terrorist attack by the Abdullah Azzam Brigades.

== Background ==
The M. Star was built by Kawasaki Heavy Industries Sakaide Works in Kagawa, Japan and launched in December 2008. It is Japanese-operated by the company Mitsui O.S.K. Lines and registered under the flag of the Marshall Islands. M. Star is a VLCC oil tanker serving oil terminals in Asia.

In 2008 it was built with one of the largest capacities that can pass through the narrow Strait of Malacca.

== The bombing in 2010 ==
The M. Star was damaged by an explosion in July of 2010, injuring one member of the ship's crew. M. Star was sailing through the Strait of Hormuz when the explosion occurred. The explosion left a dent in the hull and damaged corridors and sleeping quarters.

The UAE initially said the M. Star was damaged by a "freak wave" from an earthquake but Mitsui officials dismissed this theory along with speculations on the ship colliding with a US submarine. They claimed that the explosion was caused by an external force. A few days after the bombing, the Abdullah Azzam Brigades, a terrorist group with links to al-Qaeda claimed responsibility for the incident by releasing a photo of the claimed bomber in front of a picture of the MV.

In August, the UAE said the blast was probably caused by an attack, possibly a suicide bomber in a speedboat. Radar had picked up a suspicious craft near the tanker just before the attack, and traces of explosives were found on the hull. On November 22, 2010, the United States Maritime Administration confirmed that the blast was the result of a terrorist attack.

There were no oil leakages after the incident, and the M. Star continued on its journey to Japan
