= SIGTTO =

The Society of International Gas Tanker and Terminal operators
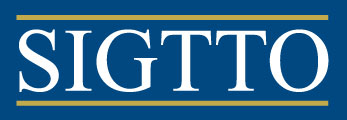

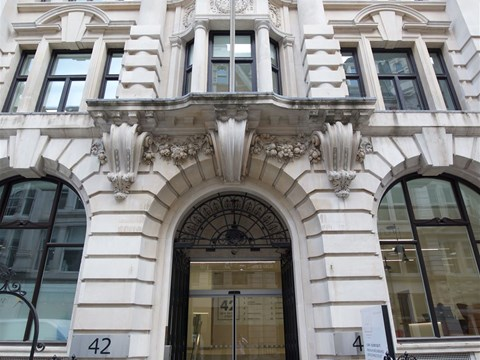
- Abbreviation: SIGTTO
- Formation: 1979
- Founded at: Bermuda
- Type: International non-profit organization
- Headquarters: London, United Kingdom
- Region served: Worldwide
- Field: Maritime and gas shipping
- Members: Over 90% of the world’s LNG vessels and terminals and around 50% of the LPG market
- Website: https://www.sigtto.org/

SIGTTO is the Society of International Gas Tanker and Terminal Operators. It is a not-for-profit non-governmental organisation that represents owners of gas carriers and terminals, including LNG terminals. SIGTTO was formed as an international organisation for industry participants to share technical and operational experience, to address common industry problems and derive policies for improvements in maritime operations. The Society has more than 190 members including large companies such as BP, ExxonMobil, Chevron and Shell. The organisation has Observer Status at the International Maritime Organization as an NGO. Focusing on LNG and LPG, the society is involved in the creation of publications to enhance maritime knowledge and promote safety at sea. They are actively involved in research for the use of gas as a marine fuel and publish various relevant industry guidelines.

== History ==
SIGTTO was founded in 1979 as a forum for tanker and terminal owners and operators. In 2019, the organisation celebrated its 40th anniversary with an anniversary forum and reception.

== Publications ==
SIGTTO and Witherbys produce nautical operational titles for gas carriers including LNG carriers, for example Liquefied Gas Handling Principles on Ships and in Terminals (LGHP4) was published in 2016. SIGTTO issue recommendations and guidance for the marine industry, including Guidance on Gas Carrier and Terminal Gangway Interface and Floating LNG Installations.

== Management ==
While a search for a new CEO is ongoing, the interim general manager of the organisation is Cherian Oommen, formerly senior technical advisor, since July 2024. The previous CEO and general manager was Ian Revell, a chartered engineer, who was appointed in September 2022 and retired in July 2024.
