= Merchant Navy Training Board =

The Merchant Navy Training Board
- Abbreviation: MNTB
- Founded at: United Kingdom
- Type: United Kingdom non-profit organization
- Headquarters: London, United Kingdom
- Region served: United Kingdom
- Field: Merchant Navy Training Standards
- Website: https://mntb.org.uk/

The Merchant Navy Training Board (abbreviated to MNTB) is a voluntary body responsible for maritime training in the United Kingdom and for the training of the British Merchant Navy. The MNTB are based at the UK Chamber of Shipping office in London and publications are provided by the Witherby Publishing Group.

The Head of the MNTB is Secretary Kathryn Neilson who leads the MNTB board responsible for setting the policies and standards of the organisation.

== Training, Standards and Syllabuses ==
The MNTB promote seafarer training in the UK and are responsible for the official UK government training syllabuses for Merchant Navy Officers. Officers are issued with an MNTB training portfolio which must be completed.

Together with OPITO (the international skills organisation for the energy industry), the MNTB provide a training programme for transitioning between the oil and gas industry into shipping.

In 2020, the MNTB launched a Careers at Sea initiative to highlight maritime careers. Additionally, in 2020, in partnership with the Merchant Navy Welfare Board and several maritime charities, the MNTB launched a Mental Health Awareness and Wellbeing Training Standard.
