= Review of Maritime Transport =

- Discipline: Transportation
- Language: English, Russian, Chinese, Arabic, Spanish, French

Publication details
- History: 1968–present
- Publisher: UNCTAD (United States)
- Frequency: Annual

Standard abbreviations
- ISO 4: Rev. Marit. Transp.

Indexing
- ISSN: 2225-3459 (print); 0566-7682 (web)
- OCLC no.: 1009038009

Links
- Journal homepage; UN Library

The Review of Maritime Transport (RMT) an annual publication by the United Nations Conference on Trade and Development (UNCTAD). It provides an analysis of structural and cyclical changes affecting seaborne trade, ports and shipping, as well as an extensive collection of statistical information

The RMT is prepared by the Division on Technology and Logistics of the UNCTAD secretariat, it is an important source of information on the port sector. It closely monitors developments affecting world seaborne trade, freight rates, ports, surface transport and logistics services, as well as trends in ship ownership, port/flag state control, fleet age, tonnage supply and productivity.

== Structure of publication ==
The review of maritime transport provides insights on:

- Seaborne trade
- Emerging trends affecting maritime transport
- Fleet ownership and registration
- Shipbuilding and demolitions
- Freight rates
- Liner shipping connectivity
- Port traffic
- Legal and regulatory developments
- A topical issue covered in a special chapter

== RMT List of yearly Special chapter ==
- 1997: Review of regional developments in small island developing countries
- 1998: Trade and transport of East and South-East Asia
- 1999: Recent trade and transport developments in Latin America
- 2000: Developments in the sub-Saharan African economic area and maritime transport
- 2001: Regional developments in trade and transport networks in East Asia, China and Japan
- 2002: Container port traffic and container terminal throughput
- 2003: Developments in African trade and maritime transport
- 2004: Developments in Asian trade and maritime transport.
- 2005: Developments in Latin American and Caribbean trade and maritime transport
- 2006: Sub Saharan Africa
- 2007: Asia
- 2008: Latin America and Caribbean
- 2009: Africa
- 2010: Asia
- 2011: Developing countries in different maritime businesses.
- 2012: Sustainable freight transport development and finance
- 2013: Securing Reliable Access to Maritime Transport for Landlocked Countries
- 2014: Small Island Developing States (SIDS)
- 2015: Shipping and Sustainable Development
- 2016: Determinants of Maritime Transport Costs
- 2017: Maritime transport connectivity
- 2018: Technological developments
- 2019: Sustainable Shipping
- 2020: Shipping in times of the COVID-19 pandemic
- 2021: Challenges faced by seafarers in view of the COVID-19 crisis
- 2022: Navigating stormy waters
- 2023. Towards a green and just transition
- 2024. Navigating maritime chokepoints

== See also ==
- Maritime transport
- Merchant vessel
