= Healthy Enterprise =

Healthy environment is a standard whose registrar is the Bureau de Normalisation du Québec. The standard aims to recognize companies that have implemented actions of workplace health promotion and workplace wellness.

== History ==
The standard was developed in 2008 with funding from the Commission for the Health and Security of Workers, Desjardins Financial Security, the Quebec Ministry of Health, and Power Corporation of Canada.

To this date, 53 companies have met the standards that are required to be certified as Healthy Enterprise's.

== Requirements ==
The standard has 5 main requirements:

1. Executive engagement in practices that promote health and wellness in the workplace;
2. The institution of a health and wellness committee that collects suggestions from employees;
3. Perform data collection to establish a clear picture of employee health;
4. Implement strategies or activities to promote health or prevent disease;
5. Evaluate activities that have been implemented

To be recognized a company has to act in at least two of the following areas of action:

- Healthy behaviors (mandatory)
- Management practices
- Workplace environment
- Work–life balance

== See also ==
- Onsite health
