= Ship-owner =

Owner of a ship

A shipowner, ship owner or ship-owner is the owner of a ship. They can be merchant vessels involved in the shipping industry or noncommercially owned. In the commercial sense of the term, a shipowner is someone who equips and exploits a ship, usually for delivering cargo at a certain freight rate, either as a per freight rate (given price for the transport of a certain cargo between two given ports) or based on hire (a rate per day). Shipowners typically hire a licensed crew and captain rather than take charge of the vessel in person. Usually the shipowner is organized through a company, but also people and investment funds can be shipowners. If owned by a ship company, the shipowner usually performs technical management of the vessel through the company, though this can also be outsourced or relayed onto the shipper through bareboat charter.

Shipowners are usually members of a national Chamber of Shipping such as the UK Chamber of Shipping. The International Chamber of Shipping is the global organisation for shipowners and their respective national chambers, representing approximately 80% of the entire world shipping tonnage.
