= International Safety Management Code =

Standard for managing ships at sea

The International Safety Management (ISM) Code is the International Maritime Organization (IMO) standard for the safe management and operation of ships at sea.

== Purpose ==
- To ensure safety at sea and prevent damage to property, personnel and environment.

In order to comply with the ISM Code, the Company operating the vessel has to be audited first (after they submit their Safety Management System Manual (SMS) and is approved by Flag Administration or Recognized Organization (RO). Once a Company is Audited, the Document of Compliance (DOC) will be issued (validity 5 years). Every Company is subject to auditing every year (three months before and after anniversary date and before DOC expiration date). Upon issuing DOC to Company (or Managing Company) each vessel can be audited to verify vessel compliance with ISM Code. Each vessel will be issued SMC (Safety Management Certificate) valid for 5 years and subject to verification of Compliance with ISM Code between second and third years of certificate validity.

Safety Management System Manual consists of the following elements:

- Commitment from top management
- A top tier policy manual
- A procedures manual that documents what is done on board the ship, during normal operations and in emergency situations
- Procedures for conducting both internal and external audits to ensure the ship is doing what is documented in the procedures manual
- A designated person ashore (DPA) to serve as the link between the ships and shore staff and to verify the SMS implementation
- A system for identifying where actual practices do not meet those that are documented and for implementing associated corrective action
- Regular management reviews

Also, the ship must be maintained in conformity with the provisions of relevant rules and regulations and with any additional requirements which may be established by the company. Comments from the auditor and/or audit body and from the ship are incorporated into the SMS by headquarters.

The requirements of the ISM Code may be applied to all commercial ships over 500 GT. The ISM Code is a chapter in SOLAS. If SOLAS does not apply then ISM is not mandatory. Compliance with ISM Code is sometimes required by vessel client regardless of Gross Tonnage ( GT).

The ISM Code was created by the IMO and Ferriby Marine's Capt. Graham Botterill, Specialist Advisor to the House of Lords in the UK on ship safety, among others.

== History ==
On the evening of March 6, 1987, the cross-channel Ro-Ro ferry Herald of Free Enterprise, carrying more than 450 passengers, around 80 crew, more than 80 cars, and close to 50 freight vehicles, left the Belgian port of Zeebrugge for the English port of Dover. Soon after the Herald of Free Enterprise passed Zeebrugge's breakwater, water flooded into the ferry's lower car deck and destabilized it, causing it to sink in a matter of minutes. 193 lives were lost.

The immediate cause of the accident was that the bow door remained wide open, allowing a great inrush of water as the vessel increased speed, while the fatigued assistant boatswain directly responsible for closing it lay asleep in his cabin. The public inquiry led by Justice Sheen revealed that the assistant boatswain's negligence was simply the last in a long string of actions that laid the groundwork for a major accident. The Sheen Report did not stop at identifying the shortcomings of the ship's master and his crew. The inquiry revealed that the shore management, Townsend Car Ferries Ltd., was just as blameworthy. Numerous memos written by Townsend ship's masters pointing out the need to implement safety-enhancing measures or address serious deficiencies on board their vessels went unheeded (Rasmussen and Svedung, 2000). The report summed up the management's cavalier attitude towards safety in the following statement: 'From top to bottom the body corporate was infected with the disease of sloppiness' (Sheen, 1987).

The Herald of Free Enterprise was a modern ferry equipped with advanced technology and operated by a highly qualified crew. Only seven years prior to the accident, it was built in a German shipyard according to international maritime safety regulations. Why did it capsize? The general frustration in the shipping industry following the capsizing of the Herald of Free Enterprise is typical of the kind of accident that precipitated in a paradigm shift in maritime safety administration and the development of the ISM Code.
