= Teledyne CARIS =

Software company in Canada

Teledyne CARIS Inc.
- Founded: 1979
- Founder: Salem Masry
- Headquarters: Fredericton, New Brunswick, Canada
- Products: Geospatial software solutions
- Website: www.teledynecaris.com

Teledyne CARIS, A business unit of Teledyne Digital Imaging, Inc. is a Canadian software company that develops and supports geomatics software for marine and land applications. The company is headquartered in Fredericton, New Brunswick, Canada. CARIS also has offices in the Netherlands, the United States and Australia, and has re-sellers offering sales and support of software products to more than 75 countries.

== History ==
The company was founded in Fredericton in 1979 as Universal Systems Ltd. and was a spin-off from research into data structures and computer-aided cartography at the University of New Brunswick's Department of Survey Engineering (now the Department of Geodesy and Geomatics Engineering). The company's first commercial software product was called "CARIS" whose acronym stood for "Computer Aided Resource Information System". The company name was changed from Universal Systems Ltd. to CARIS in the early 2000s in recognition of this first product and recognized brand. CARIS was wholly acquired on May 3, 2016, by international conglomerate Teledyne Technologies and renamed "Teledyne CARIS."

== Products ==
Teledyne CARIS Inc. provides Geographic Information Systems (GIS) and related software for terrestrial applications such as land management, municipal planning and geology, as well as marine and hydrographic applications. The marine and hydrographic software is designed to handle the hydrographic workflow from the time sensor data is recorded through to its inclusion in a nautical chart or other GIS product. The company terms this the "Ping-to-Chart" workflow and has trademarked the term "Ping-to-Chart".

A CARIS Spatial Archive, often referred to as a CSAR file, is a data storage mechanism designed for storing large amounts of bathymetric data.

== Standards work ==
Teledyne CARIS Inc. is a member of the Open Geospatial Consortium (OGC) and is a proponent of interoperability between different GIS systems. It markets its own GIS server which implements several OGC specifications, including Web Map Service (WMS) and Web Feature Service (WFS).

Through liaisons with the International Hydrographic Organization (IHO), and with the hydrographic community, Teledyne CARIS Inc. has been closely involved in the development of the S-57, S-100, and other IHO standards. The company has also participated in the development, implementation, production and usage of electronic chart specifications such as Electronic Navigational Chart (ENC) and Digital Nautical Chart (DNC).
