= Electronic navigational chart =

Digital Map

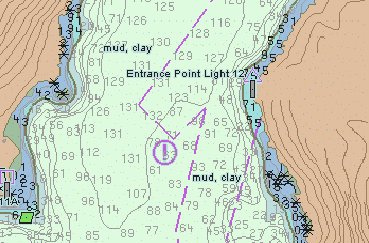
Electronic navigational chart (NOAA)

An electronic navigational chart (ENC) is an official database created by a national hydrographic office for use with an Electronic Chart Display and Information System (ECDIS). ECDIS and ENCs are the primary means of electronic navigation on cargo ships. Charts can be used in navigation to provide an indication of location once a position is fixed and the charted depths can be used in under keel clearance (UKC) calculations to ensure the ship is navigating in safe water.

Inland Electronic Chart Display and Information System are similar systems used for navigation of inland water.

== ENC ==
An Electronic Navigational Chart (ENC) is a digital representation of a real-world geographical area for the purpose of Marine navigation. Real-world objects and areas of navigational significance, or to a lesser degree - informational significance, are portrayed through Raster facsimiles of traditional paper charts; or more commonly through vector images, which are able to scale their relative position and size to meet a Mariner's Selected Viewing Scale (MSVS) displayed through an ECDIS.

The first ENC was patented in 1986 by Mortimer Rogoff, Peter Winkler, and John N. Ackley with Navigation Sciences, Inc in Bethesda, Maryland (Patent number: 4590569).

All Navigational charts must meet the requirements set out in the SOLAS (Safety of Lives at Sea) Convention. To meet these requirements, ENC's created and published by a Hydrographic Authority must conform to the internationally recognised standards stated in the publications set out by the International Hydrographic Organization (IHO). Presently the S-57 Standard is the only ENC standard which meets SOLAS chart carriage requirements. The IHO and its parent body the International Maritime Organization (IMO) have begun a transition to a new suite of standards that is targeted to exist as a unified, interactive suite of products and standards within the S-100 Universal Hydrographic Data Model. Within this model an updated standard for the production and publishing of ENCs is under development; The S-101 product specification. At present Hydrographic Authorities must only produce and publish data to the S-57 product specification, from here that published data can be certified as an ENC. Only ENCs can be used within ECDIS to meet the International Maritime Organization (IMO) performance standard for ECDIS.

ENCs are available for wholesale distribution to chart agents and resellers from Regional Electronic Navigational Chart Centres (RENCs). The RENCs are not-for-profit organizations made up of ENC-producer countries. RENCs independently check each ENC submitted by the contributing countries to ensure that they conform to the relevant IHO standards. The RENCs also act collectively as one-stop wholesalers of most of the world's ENCs.

IHO Publication S-63 developed by the IHO Data Protection Scheme Working Group is used to encrypt and digitally sign ENC data. Chart data is captured based on standards stated in IHO Publication S-57, and is displayed according to a display standard set out in IHO Publication S-52 to ensure consistency of data rendering between different systems.

IMO adopted compulsory carriage of ECDIS and ENCs on new high speed craft from 1 July 2010 and progressively for other craft from 2012 to 2018.

The term "ENC" typically refers to "Electronic Navigational Chart," which is a standardized format used for digital navigation charts. While there are variations and different specifications within ENC charts, they generally serve similar purposes across different regions and organizations. Here are seven types or categories of ENC charts commonly recognized:

=== Standard ENC (SENC) ===
These are the standard Electronic Navigational Charts that conform to the International Hydrographic Organization (IHO) S-57 and S-101 standards. SENCs are used for navigation on vessels equipped with Electronic Chart Display and Information Systems (ECDIS).

=== Official ENC (O-ENC) ===
Official ENC charts are those that are officially produced and maintained by national hydrographic offices or other authorized agencies. They are updated regularly to reflect the latest survey data and navigational information.

=== Base ENC (B-ENC) ===
Base ENC charts are fundamental ENC datasets that contain essential navigation information. They serve as a foundation upon which additional layers or specific chart editions can be built.

=== Regional ENC (R-ENC) ===
Regional ENC charts cover specific geographic regions and are tailored to the needs of vessels operating within those areas. They may include localized navigation aids, safety information, and specific hydrographic data relevant to the region.

=== Port ENC (P-ENC) ===
Port ENC charts focus specifically on harbor and port areas. They provide detailed information on berthing facilities, channels, depths, and other navigational aids within ports to aid safe navigation and maneuvering.

=== Route ENC (RTE-ENC) ===
Route ENC charts are used for planning and navigating specific routes, such as ferry routes, shipping lanes, or other designated passages. They may include additional information relevant to the designated route, such as traffic separation schemes or recommended tracks.

=== Overlay ENC (OVL-ENC) ===
Overlay ENC charts are used to provide additional layers of information over a base ENC. They may include thematic overlays such as environmental data, fishing zones, or military exercise areas, allowing mariners to overlay different types of information on a single chart display. These categories help classify different types of ENC charts based on their intended use, geographic coverage, and the specific information they provide to support safe navigation.

== ECDIS ==
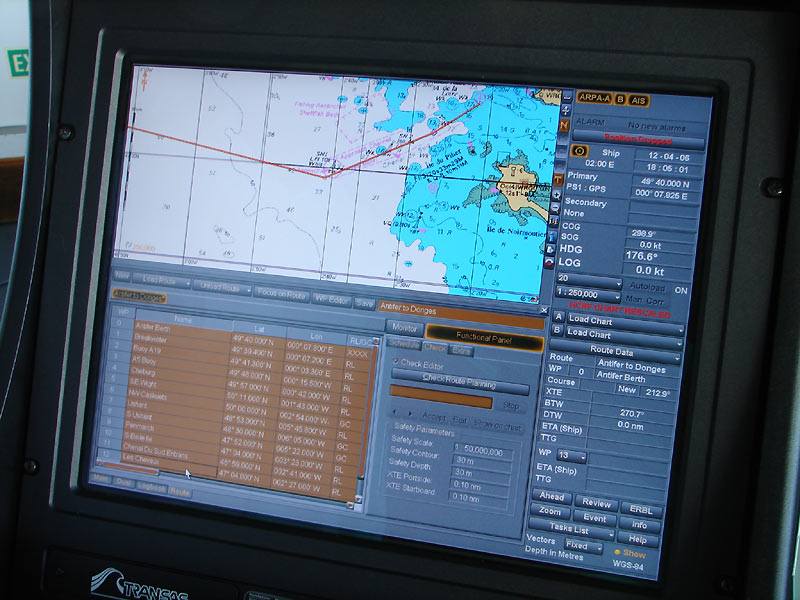
An ECDIS using ENCs on a merchant ship

An Electronic Chart Display and Information System (ECDIS) is a geographic information system used for nautical navigation that complies with International Maritime Organization (IMO) and IHO regulations as a method of electronic navigation. It is considered as an alternative to paper nautical charts for navigation by ships. IMO refers to similar systems not meeting the regulations as Electronic Chart Systems (ECSs).

An ECDIS displays the information from Electronic Navigational Charts (ENC) together with the vessel's position, heading and speed obtained from water reference systems, and optionally information from other navigational sensors such as radar, Navtex, Automatic Identification Systems (AIS), and depth sounders.

In recent years concerns from the industry have been raised as to the system's security especially with regards to cyber attacks and GPS spoofing

ECDIS provides continuous position and navigational safety information. The system generates audible and/or visual alarms when the vessel is in proximity to navigational hazards. Military versions of ECDIS are known as WECDIS (warship ECDIS) or ECDIS-N (ECDIS-naval).

Modern ECDIS Platforms are commonly integrated with Integrated Bridge Systems (IBS), allowing navigation, radar, AIS, voyage planning, and sensor data to be presented within a unified situational-awareness environment.

== Regulations ==
ECDIS (as defined by IHO Publications S-57 and S-52) is an approved marine navigational chart and information system, which is accepted as complying with the conventional paper charts required by Regulation V/19 of the 1974 IMO SOLAS Convention. as amended. The performance requirements for ECDIS are defined by IMO and the consequent test standards have been developed by the International Electrotechnical Commission (IEC) in International Standard IEC 61174.

=== S-100 ===
In the future, the ENC will be part of a product specification family which is based on the "IHO Universal Hydrographic Data Model", known as S-100. The product specification number S-101 has been assigned to the ENC. ENCs are now being produced under the S-100 standard and it is envisaged that S-100 ENCs will replace S-57 data sets by the 2030s. The new ENC standards include greater data layers allowing for enhanced navigation formats, such as S-129 on Under Keel Clearance Management (UCKM). Other sub-formats include S-102 on Bathymetric Surfaces, S-111 on Surface Currents and S-124 on Navigational Warnings.

== See also ==
- Argo Navigation
- C-MAP
- e-Navigation concept
- Navionics
- Raster Navigational Charts (NOAA)
