= Hydrographics =

Hydrographics may refer to:

- Hydrography, the measurement of physical characteristics of waters and marginal land
- Hydrographics (printing), a printing technique for three-dimensional objects
- Hydrographic Department, UK agency for providing hydrographic and marine geospatial data
- Hydrographic surveys, science of measurement and description of features which affect maritime navigation, construction, dredging, oil exploration, and drilling
- Atlas Hydrographic, a hydrographic and oceanographic systems company

== See also ==
- International Hydrographic Organization
  - List of Members of the International Hydrographic Organization
