= Marine navigation =

Process of steering a ship from a starting point to a destination

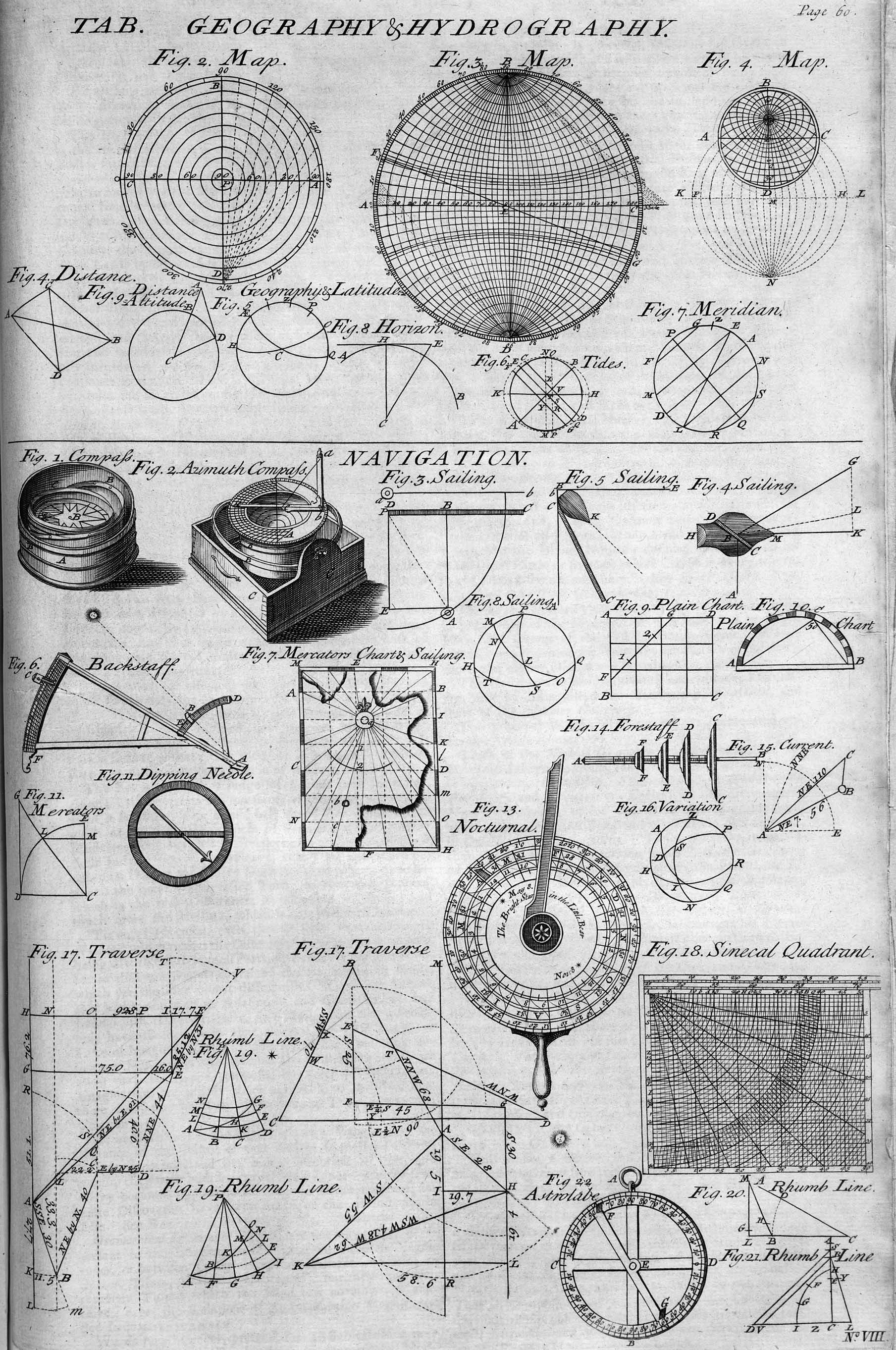
Table of geography, hydrography and navigation, from the Cyclopaedia of 1728.

Marine navigation or nautical science is the art and science of steering a ship from a starting point (sailing) to a destination, efficiently and responsibly. It is an art because of the skill that the navigator must have to avoid the dangers of navigation, and it is a science because it is based on physical, mathematical, oceanographic, cartographic, astronomical, and other knowledge.

Marine navigation can be surface or submarine.

== Etymology ==
Navigation (from the Latin word navigatio) is the act of sailing or voyaging. Nautical (from Latin nautĭca, and this from Greek ναυτική [τέχνη] nautikḗ [téjne] "[art of] sailing" and from ναύτης nautes "sailor") is that pertaining to navigation and the science and art of sailing. Naval (from the Latin adjective navalis) is that relating to ships and navigation, or particularly to the navy.

In Ancient Rome, the navicularii conducted long-distance trade by sea.

== History ==
Coastal navigation was practiced since the most ancient times. The biblical account of the great flood, where the Noah's Ark appears, is based both on myths and on the navigational practice of the Mesopotamian civilizations, who from the Sumerians onwards navigated their two rivers (Tigris and Euphrates) and the Persian Gulf. The ancient Egyptians did not limit themselves to inland navigation of the Nile either, and used the Mediterranean sea routes existing since the Neolithic — through which cultural phenomena such as megalithism or the metallurgy would have spread for millennia. The Cretans even established a true thalassocracy (government of the seas, attributed to King Minos) until the Mycenaean period (2nd millennium BC), when the events mythologized in the Homeric poems (Note: More than a thousand "concave ships" arriving on the beaches of Troy, bad fortune of the navigator Ulysses and the expertise of the "Argonauts" — among whom is the builder of the ship that bears his name, Argus) ought to be placed.

The Hittites, led by King Šuppiluliuma II faced the Cyprus in the first historically recorded naval battle (ca. 1210 BC); at the same time, all the civilizations of the Eastern Mediterranean suffered from the incursions of the denominated "Sea Peoples".

The Phoenicians — whom the Greeks considered their masters in navigation and who are also cited in the Bible — (Note: Ships from Tyre supplied King Solomon with goods from distant places, including Tarshish — Tartessos — to the same destination a Phoenician ship was carrying Jonah, until the crew threw him into the sea when they blamed him for the storm that threatened to sink them.) would have been the first Mediterranean civilization to sail the high seas by sculling and sailing, guided by the sun during the day and by the North Star at night. It is recorded that, crossing the Strait of Gibraltar — the "Rock of Gibraltar", the so-called "Pillars of Hercules" in the Greek myths — they sailed across the Atlantic Ocean reaching the south to some point on the west coast of Africa and the north to the British Isles (or even beyond, to the place that the texts call Thule), but it is unclear if they circumnavigated Africa or crossed the Atlantic reaching America, something most likely achieved by the Norsemen in the 10th century.

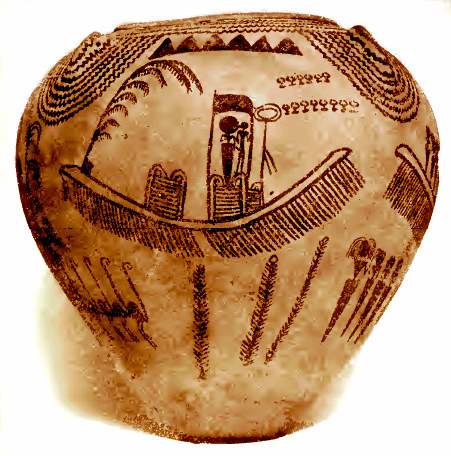
Boat depicted on Egyptian pottery from the Predynastic period (Naqada II, mid-4th millennium BC).

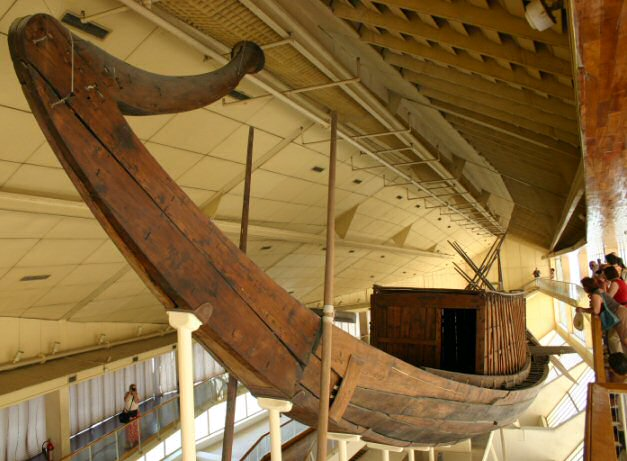
Khufu ship, IV dynasty, ca. 2500 BC.

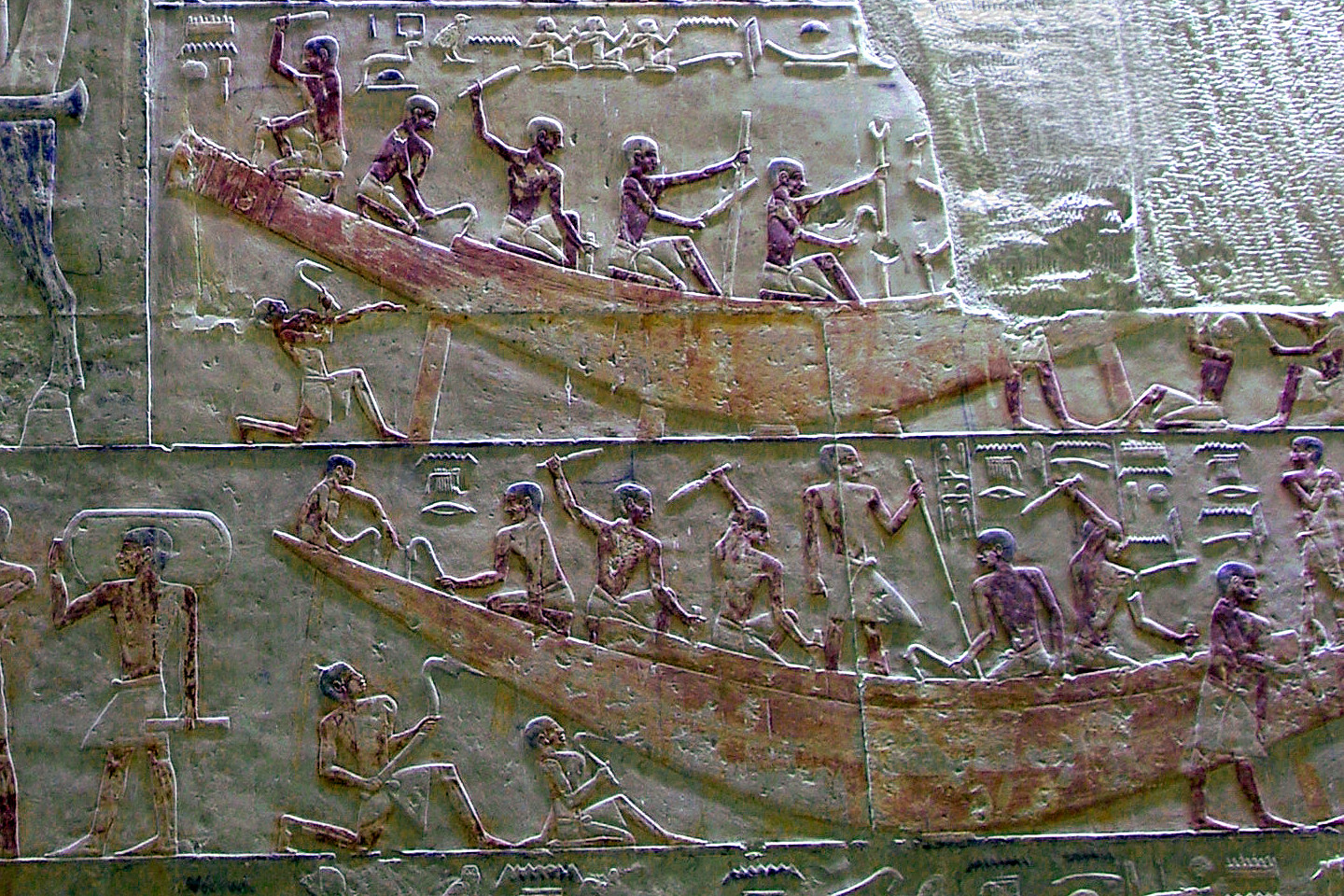
Boat building depicted in reliefs from the Mastaba of Ti at Saqqara, dynasty V, mid-3rd millennium BC.

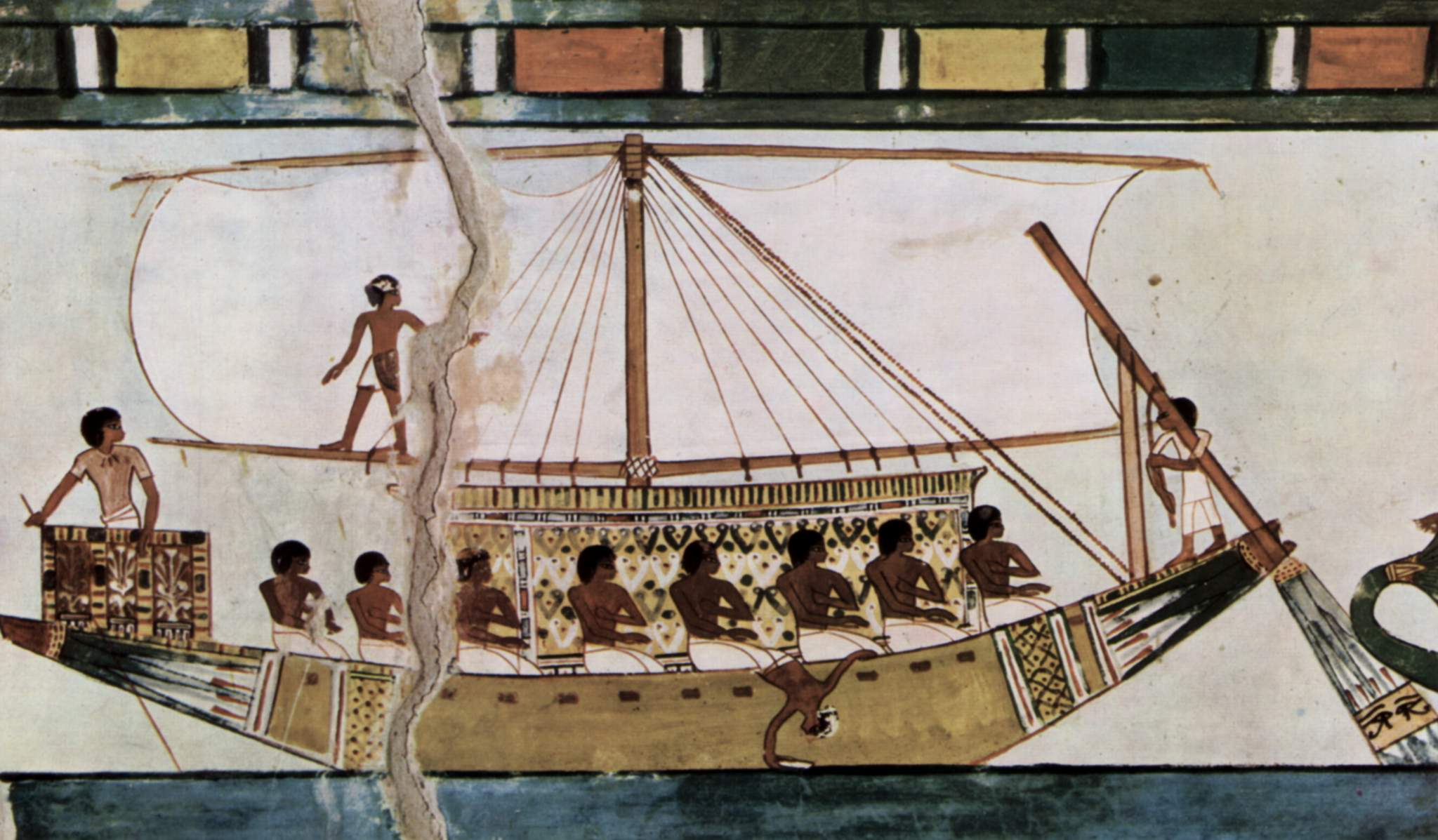
Egyptian boat represented in the tomb of Menna, Tombs of the Nobles, 18th dynasty, mid-2nd millennium BC.

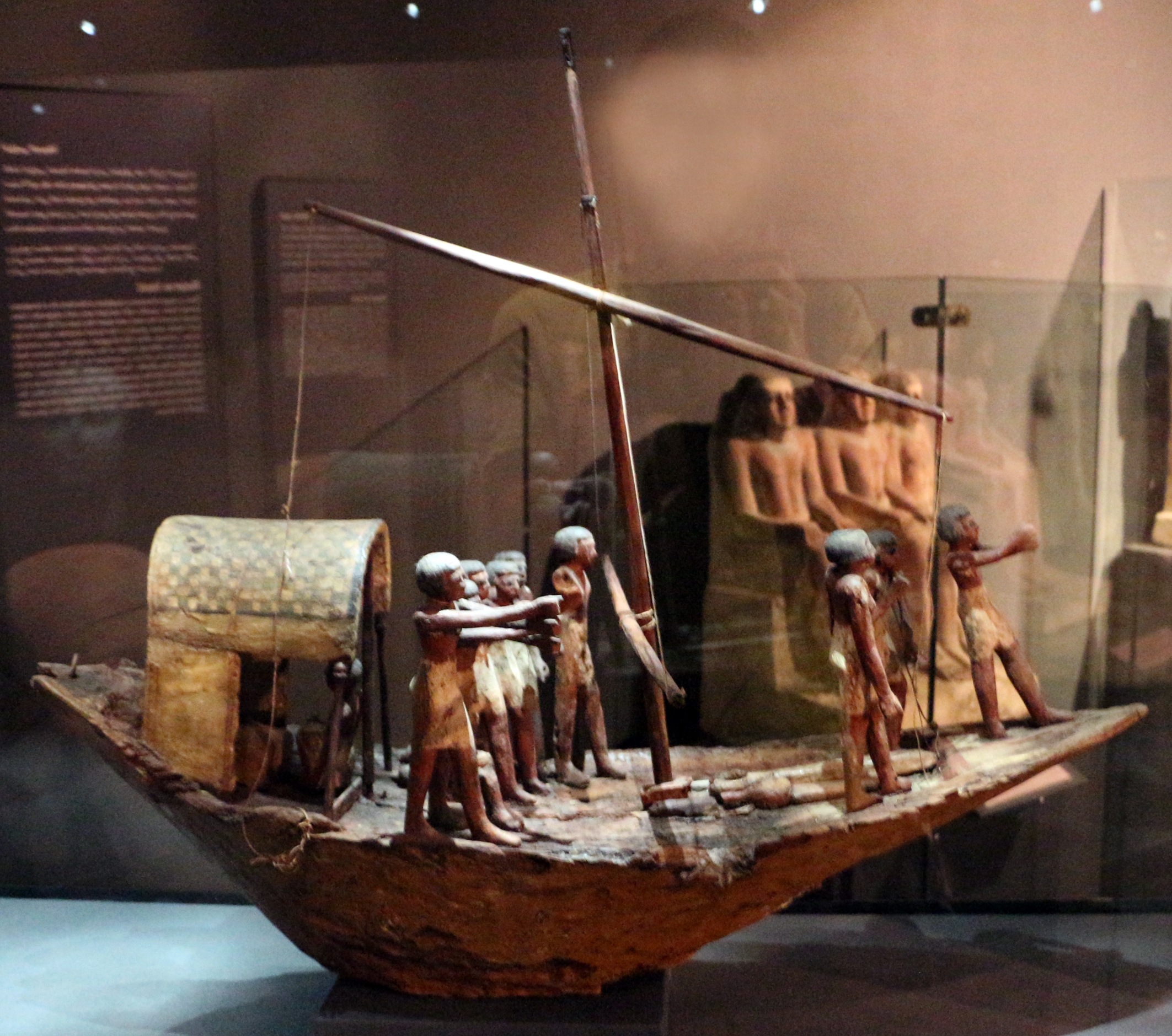
Model of an Egyptian ship and crew.

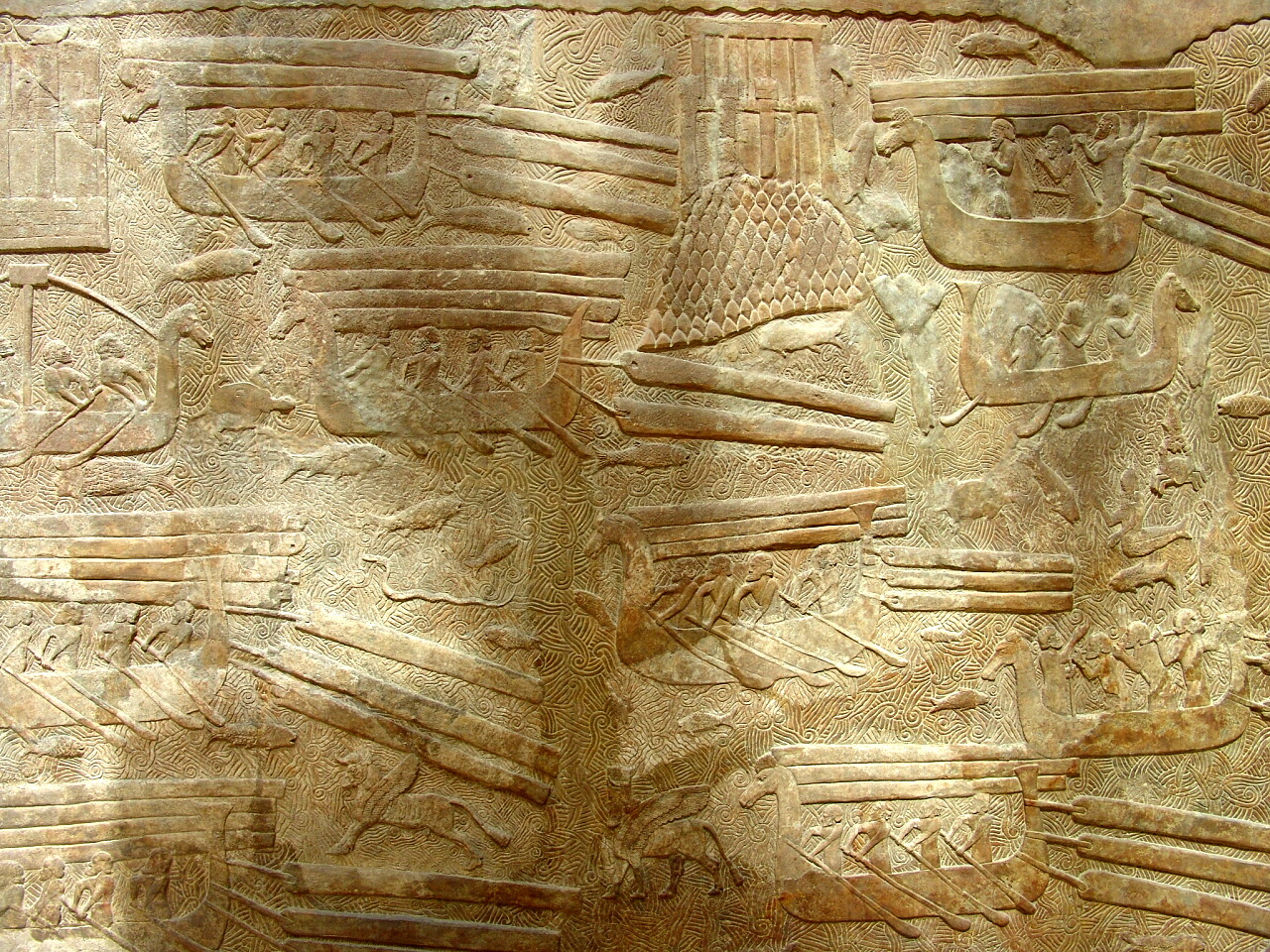
Type of Phoenician ships called hippos (name given by the Greeks, because of its mascaron shaped like a horse's head) carrying wood, depicted in an Assyrian relief from Sargon's palace at Khorsabad.

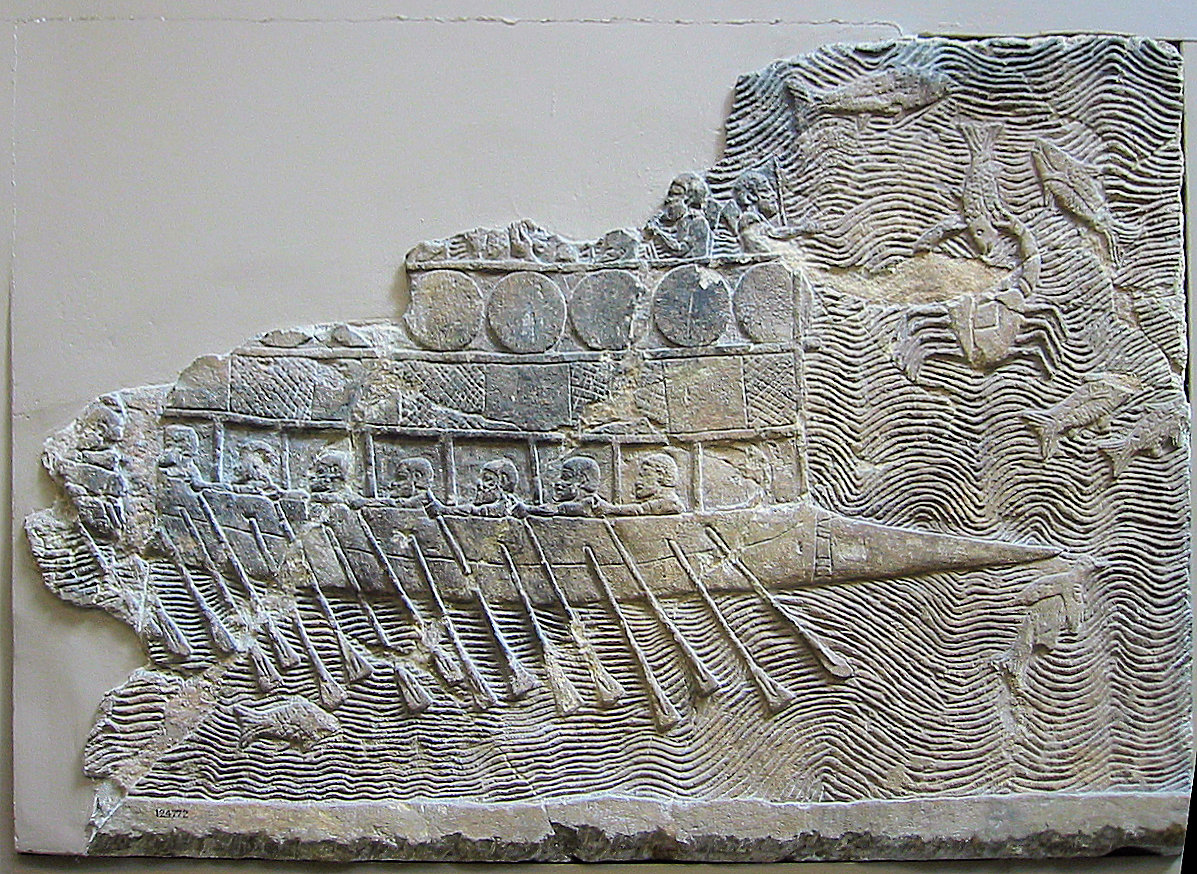
King Luli of Sidon flees from his city, attacked by Sargon II, in a type of Phoenician warship called dieris (bireme, with two rows of rowers). Assyrian relief from the palace of Sennacherib, ca. 700-692 BC.

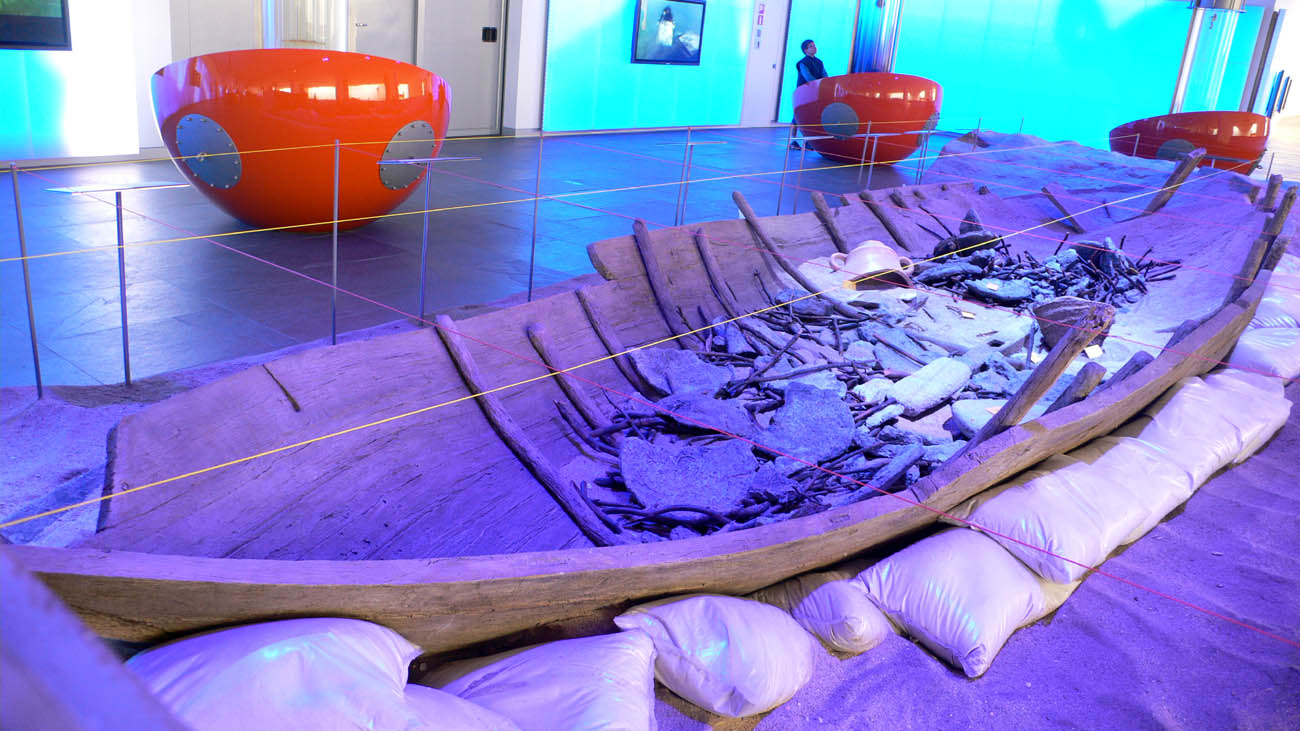
One of the Phoenician vessels of Mazarrón, 7th century BC.

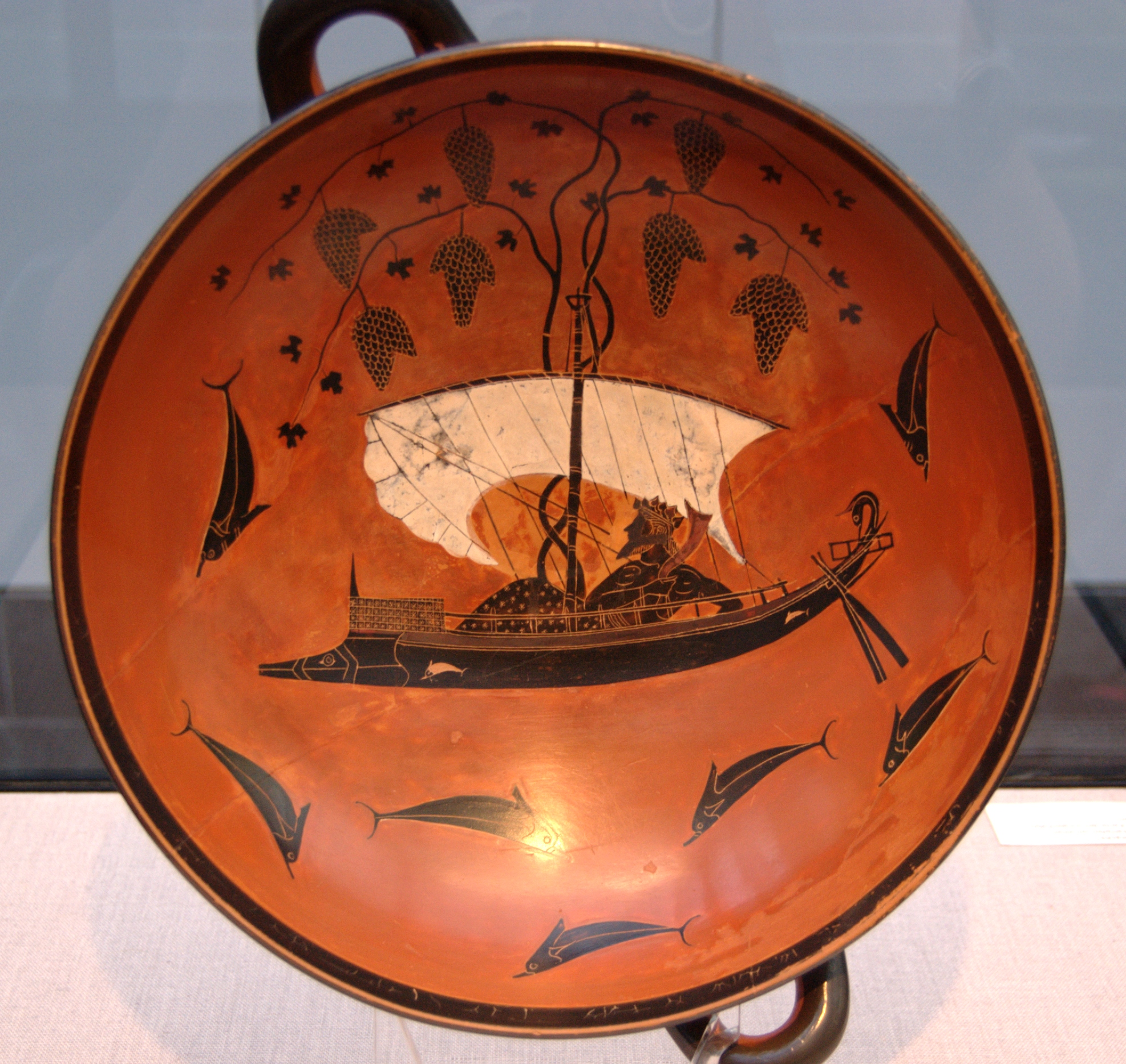
Dionysus Cup, by Exekias, 6th Century

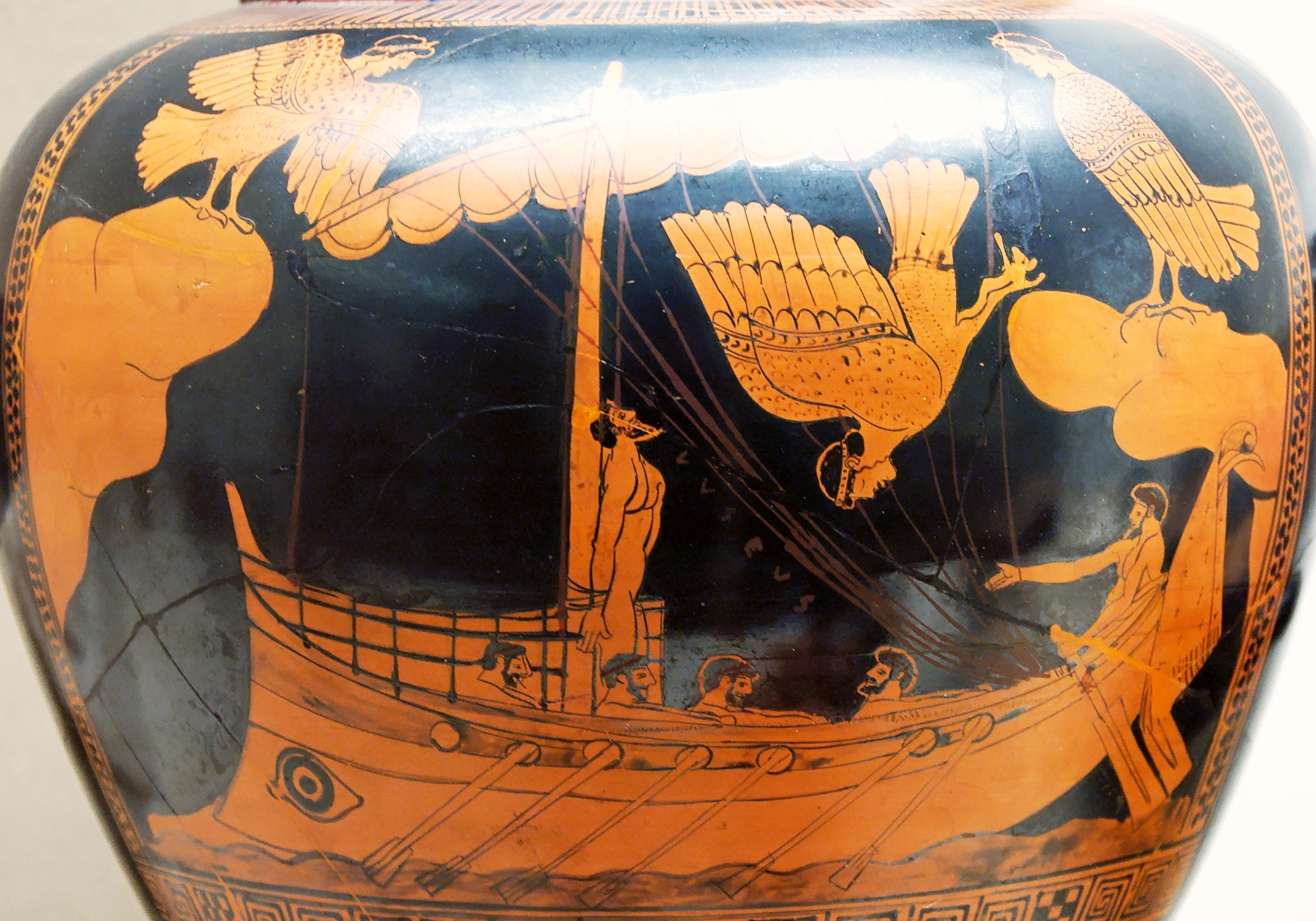
Scene from the Odyssey (Ulysses' companions manage to free their ship from the Sirens' trap, while their leader listens to their song tied to the mast). 5th century.

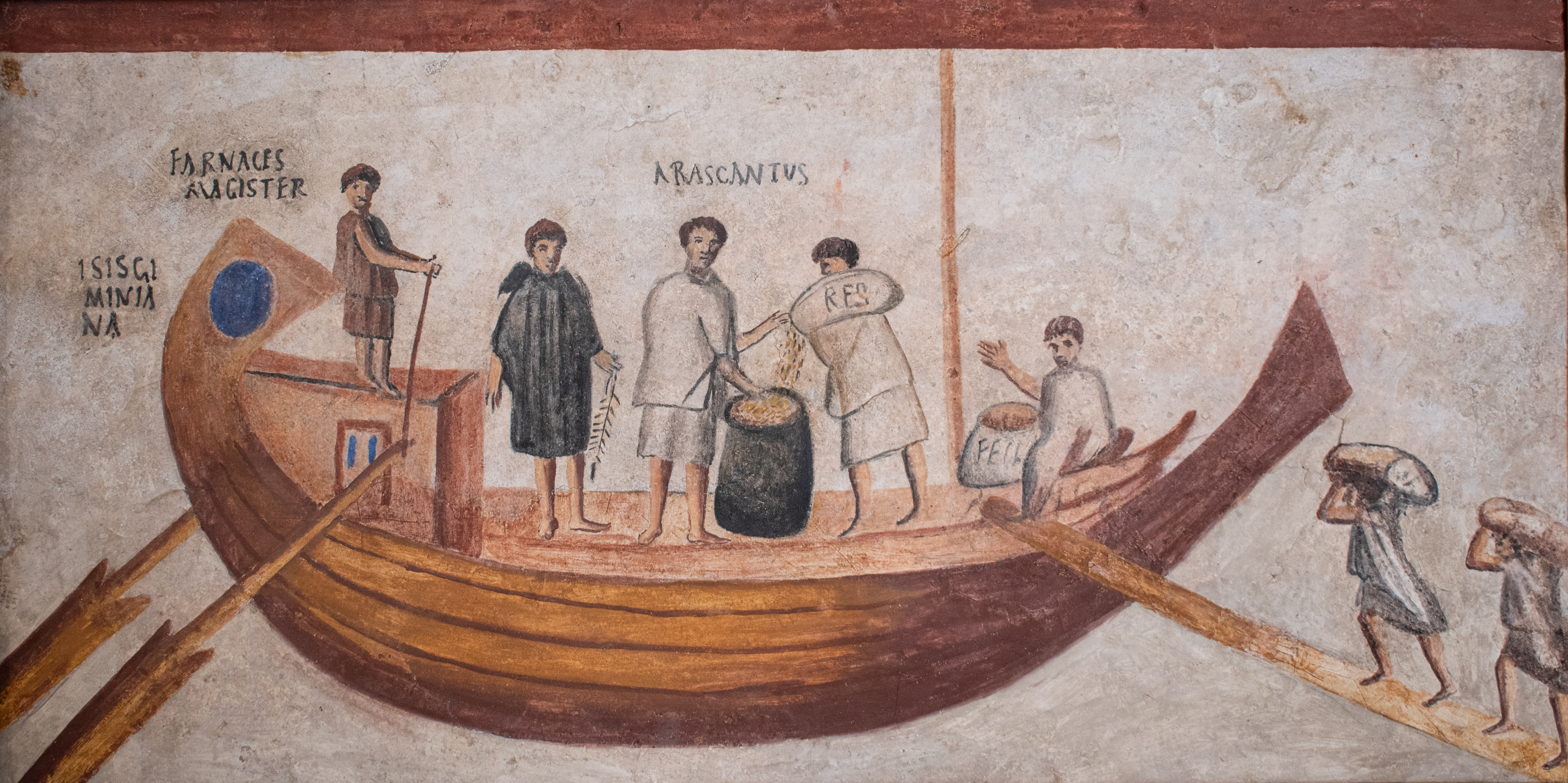
Roman ship represented in a fresco of the 2nd or 3rd century in the port city of Ostia. The inscriptions reflect the name of the ship (Isis Giminiana), the name of the captain or magister (Farnaces, at the helm) and the name of the owner (Arascanius, in charge of the cargo).

In the Indian and Pacific oceans, the oceanic navigations made it possible to populate all the archipelagoes (Polynesian navigation). However, the possibility of reaching South America is still a matter of debate — the settlement of the Americas through the Bering Strait would not have required navigation, or in any case, coastal navigation would have sufficed — as well as other possible pre-Columbian transoceanic contacts. In the first quarter of the 15th century, the Chinese expeditions led by Zheng He reached the African coasts of the Indian Ocean. It has been proposed that they might have reached the South Atlantic and even America and Europe, but this proposal has not been accepted beyond mere speculation.

Mediterranean navigation, which the Romans had come to control (undisputed Mare Nostrum since their victories over the Carthaginians in the Punic Wars [264-146 BC], the Egyptians during the Battle of Actium [31 BC], and pirates), was once again a contested environment in the Middle Ages, from the moment the Vandals managed to attack the Italian coasts from the sea. In the 6th century, the Byzantines managed to regain control, and in the 7th century it was the Arabs who ended up dividing the Mediterranean area, which even the Vikings and Normans were able to access. Since the time of the Crusades, Venetian, Genoese and Crown of Aragon navigators also had a strong presence. Knowledge of the compass, transmitted to the Europeans by the Arabs (who in turn had obtained it from the Chinese), together with other improvements in astronomical techniques (astrolabe, Jacob's staff, sextant, cartographic techniques (portulan and shipbuilding (caravel, nau, galleon), made the Age of Discovery — initially led by the Portuguese and Castilians — possible, especially after Henry the Navigator impulsed the school of Sagres. In 1492, the first voyage of Christopher Columbus took place. In 1488, Bartolomeu Dias rounded the Cape of Good Hope, which opened the route to the Indian Ocean — Vasco de Gama reached Calicut (India) in 1498. Between 1519 and 1521, the Magellan-Elcano expedition circumnavigated the world — measuring the geographical longitude with the method of its scientific organizer, Rui Faleiro. Until the 16th century, the Spanish-Portuguese hegemony in navigation was patent in fields such as geography and cosmography. Both English and French pilots learned to navigate from the texts of Pedro de Medina, Martín Fernández de Enciso and Martín Cortés, among others. The conjunction of "cannons and sails" has been argued to have given European states the advantage to prevail over the rest, launching the modern "world system".

Since the 18th century, England exercised maritime hegemony, a fact that was confirmed in the early 19th century with the Battle of Trafalgar (1805). Among the main English expeditions of the time were Captain Cook's (1768-1779), also the second expedition of the Beagle (1831-1836) — which was of great importance for the later development of Charles Darwin's theory of evolution. Already fully in the age of steam navigation, techniques and vessels continued to be perfected in transoceanic sailing (clipper), that did not become obsolete for commercial navigation until the 20th century — especially after the opening of the Panama Canal. Even then, the unbridled optimism that characterized the naval design of the time suffered a severe blow with the sinking of the Titanic (1912).

Contemporary shipping has massively ceased to perform one of its traditional functions and has been replaced by aviation, such as passenger transport, although with two important exceptions: leisure travel (tourism by cruise ships) and irregular traffic of people (irregular immigration). Since the Second Industrial Revolution, the main volume of freight transport has been hydrocarbons (oil tankers and gas tankers). Other raw materials are also transported in bulk on cargo ships, but from 1956 onward, a large part of goods of all kinds were adapted to standardized containers that speed up loading and unloading, allowing a combination with land transport (hub). Highly technological navigation has reduced crews and increased the size of ships. For example, in deep-sea fishing, which locates its prey with sophisticated means and lasts indefinitely in time — freezer ships or factory ships — which in some circumstances has made them vulnerable to new forms of piracy.

== Methods and techniques ==
These are the methods used in maritime navigation to solve the three problems of the navigator:

- Determining and maintaining the "course".
- Determining the "time", the "speed" and "distance", for the duration of the voyage.
- Knowing the "depth" in which one is sailing so as not to run aground.

=== Coastal navigation ===
Navigation and location of the ship by positioning techniques based on the observation of bearings and distances to notable points on the coast (lighthouses, capes, buoys, etc.) by visual means (pelorus), observation of horizontal angles (sextant) or electronic methods (bearings from radar to racons, transponders, etc.)

=== Dead reckoning navigation ===
Navigation and location of the ship by analytical means, after considering the following elements: initial location, bearing(s) — whether absolute bearings, surface bearings, or relative bearings. Also velocity as well as the external factors that have influenced the course either partially or entirely, such as the wind (leeway) and/or the current (bearing of the current and hourly current intensity). The point obtained from the calculations is called the "Dead reckoning location", with its corresponding latitude and longitude. This point is also known as Fantasy point.

=== Loxodromic navigation ===
Navigation that follows a rhumb line — that is, all meridians are cut at the same angle. On a nautical chart following the Mercator projection, a loxodromic is represented by a straight line.

This type of navigation is useful for not too long distances, as it allows the course to remain steady, but it does not offer the shortest distance.

=== Orthodromic navigation ===
Navigation that follows the shortest distance between two points, i.e., that which follows a great circle. Such routes yield the shortest distance between two points on the globe. To calculate the bearing and distance between two points it is necessary to solve a spherical triangle whose vertices are the origin, the destination, and the pole.

=== Celestial navigation ===
Navigation and location of the ship by geopositioning techniques based on the observation of the stars and other celestial bodies. The variables measured to find the location are: the observed angular height of the stars above the horizon, measured with the sextant (formerly with the astrolabe or other instrument), and the time, measured with the chronometer.

Conceptually, the process is not complex to understand:

- Knowing the time of the observation, and with the data contained in the nautical calendar, it is possible to determine the astronomical coordinates of the observed star.
- Knowing the coordinates of the observed star and the height above the horizon with which it was observed, we can deduce that the observer's position is located on a circle whose center is located at the geographical point directly below the star.
- Any observer located at any point on that circle will observe the star with the same height above the horizon.
- The observer can therefore know that his position is somewhere on this circle.

In practice, the mathematical process, called "reduction" of the observation, can be complex for the uninitiated. To the height observed with the sextant, it is necessary to apply a series of corrections to compensate for atmospheric refraction, parallax and other errors. Once this is done, it is necessary to solve a spherical triangle by mathematical and trigonometric methods.

There are many methods to do this. The manual methods use tables (trigonometric, logarithms, etc.) to facilitate the calculations. The introduction of calculators and electronic computers at the end of the 20th century greatly facilitated the calculation, but the creation of GPS made celestial navigation no longer important, relegating it to the background as an alternative method in case of failure of the on-board electronics or as a hobby of scientific interest.

=== Electronic navigation ===
Navigation and location of the ship by positioning techniques based on the aids provided by global positioning systems, such as GPS, GLONASS, or GALILEO. It is the system most widely spread and easiest to use, in spite of the errors that may arise.

=== Inertial navigation ===
Navigation and location of the ship by means of the analysis of the data provided by accelerometers and/or gyroscopes located on board, which integrate the accelerations experienced in complex electronic systems, that converted into velocities (in the 3 possible axes of displacement) and according to the observed courses, make it possible to obtain the location of the ship.

== Iconography ==
The harbinger of a successful navigation was the dolphin, which is why its representation became the symbol carried by all ships.

More recently, navigation was represented as a woman crowned with ship's sterns whose clothes are agitated by the winds. She rests one hand on a rudder and the other holds the instrument for measuring height. At her feet, the ampoule, the compass, the trident of Neptune and the riches of commerce, while the sea can be seen on the horizon, completed by a lighthouse and traversed by ships at full sail.

== See also ==
- Age of Sail
- Argo Navigation
- Bowditch's American Practical Navigator
- World Cruising Routes
- Navigation
- Navionics
