= RNC =

RNC may refer to:

== Science and technology ==
- Radio Network Controller, a governing element of a mobile phone network
- Ribosome-nascent chain complex, in biology
- Romanian National R&D Computer Network, registry for the .ro top-level domain
- .rnc, file extension for Relax NG files in compact syntax
- Raster Navigational Charts (NOAA), a raster file format for nautical charts
- RNC, a randomized computational complexity class extending NC

== Organisations ==
- Nishinippon Broadcasting, a Japanese commercial broadcaster
- Royal Newfoundland Constabulary, a police force in Newfoundland and Labrador, Canada
- Russia-NATO Council, for cooperation between Russia and NATO military alliance
- Riverside National Cemetery, a cemetery in Riverside, California for the interment of US military personnel
- Royal National College for the Blind, a college in Hereford, UK
- Royal Niger Company, a mercantile company chartered by the British government in the nineteenth century

== Politics ==
- Republican National Committee, the principal campaign and fund-raising organization affiliated with the US Republican Party
- Republican National Convention, the nominating convention for the United States Republican Party
- Rwanda National Congress, a political movement created by prominent Rwandan dissidents

== Other uses ==
- Rear naked choke, a martial arts move
- Ranchi Junction railway station (station code: RNC), Jharkhand, India
