= E-Navigation =

UN strategy to improve shipping safety

e-Navigation is a strategy developed by the International Maritime Organization (IMO), a UN specialized agency, to bring about increased safety of navigation in commercial shipping through better organization of data on ships and on shore, and better data exchange and communication between ships and the ship and shore. The concept was launched when maritime authorities from seven nations requested the IMO's Maritime Safety Committee to add the development of an e-navigation strategy to the work programs of the IMO's NAV and COMSAR sub-committees. Working groups in three sub-committees (NAV, COMSAR and STW) and an intersessional correspondence group, led by Norway, have subsequently developed a Strategy Implementation Plan (SIP). Member states of IMO and a number of Intergovernmental and non-governmental organisations have contributed to the work, including the International Hydrographic Organization (IHO), Comité International Radio-Maritime (CIRM), the International Association of Lighthouse Authorities (IALA), the International Chamber of Shipping (ICS), the Baltic and International Maritime Council (BIMCO) and the International Electrotechnical Commission (IEC)

== Background ==
An input paper to IMO’s Maritime Safety Committee’s 81st session in 2005 from Japan, Marshall Islands, the Netherlands, Norway, Singapore, the United Kingdom and the United States identified that there was a clear need to equip the master of a vessel, and those responsible for the safety of shipping ashore, with modern proven tools to make marine navigation and communications more reliable and thereby reduce errors − especially those with a potential for loss of life, injury, environmental damage and undue commercial costs.

It also identified that more substantial and widespread benefits for states, shipowners and seafarers could be expected to arise from the increased safety at sea, which was identified as the core objective of e-navigation.

Also according to the United Kingdom’s Marine Accident Investigation Branch, navigational errors and failures, including those of the human element, had been significant in over half of the incidents meriting a full investigation between 2002 and 2005. The input paper also noted that accidents related to navigation continue to occur despite the development and availability of a number of ship- and shore-based technologies that improve situational awareness and decision-making. These include the Automatic Identification System (AIS), Electronic Chart Display and Information System (ECDIS), Integrated Bridge Systems/Integrated Navigation Systems (IBS/INS), Automatic Radar Plotting Aids (ARPA), radio navigation, Long Range Identification and Tracking systems (LRIT), Vessel Traffic Service (VTS) and the Global Maritime Distress Safety System (GMDSS).

It was therefore proposed to add a new item on e-navigation to the work programme of the Sub-Committee on Safety of Navigation (NAV) and also to that on Radiocommunications and Search and Rescue (COMSAR). The aim was to develop a strategic vision for the utilization of existing and new navigational tools, in particular electronic tools, in a holistic and systematic manner. e-navigation can thereby help reduce navigational accidents, errors and failures by developing standards for an accurate and cost-effective system that would make a major contribution to the IMO’s agenda of safe, secure and efficient shipping on clean oceans.

=== Human element, training and harmonization ===
Modern systems have demonstrated improved developments in technology with regards to navigation and communication systems. As a result, mariners may have access to sophisticated technological support systems, which furthers the need to use coordinate systems and increase use of harmonised standards. Although most ships now carry Global Navigation Satellite System (GNSS), and all have reliable Electronic Chart Displays and Information Systems (ECDIS), their use on board is not fully integrated and harmonised with other existing systems. It has been identified that human elements (including training, competency, language skills, workload and motivation) are essential to consider; Administrative burden, information overload and ergonomics are prominent concerns in regards to human users. A need has been identified for the application of good ergonomic principles in a well-structured human machine interface as part of the e-navigation strategy.

=== e-Navigation definition ===
At MSC 85, the committee, taking into account inputs from the industry and other relevant organizations (e.g., IALA and IHO), approved the strategy for the development and implementation of e-navigation and developed the following definition of e-navigation:

e-navigation is the harmonized collection, integration, exchange, presentation and analysis of marine information on board and ashore by electronic means to enhance berth to berth navigation and related services for safety and security at sea and protection of the marine environment.

=== Benefits for users and stakeholders ===
On a global level e-navigation will:

- Standardize bridge design which globally enhances the opportunity to work cross-border, improves efficiency in training and reduces material cost. Similarities between nations and vessels would also increase efficiency and improve safety.
- Reduce barriers of trade through reduction of local solutions and bureaucracy.
- Reduce the risk of accidents and incidents.

For coastal states, flag states and port states e-navigation will:

- Improve efficiency in training, certification and supervision;
- Improve situational awareness by providing easy access to standard and reliable information;
- Improve efficiency in supervision, coordination, control, as well as coordination and information;
- Reduce the risk of accidents and incidents through efficient use of VTS services.

For branches, organizations and industry e-navigation will:

- Provide flexibility with regards to training and rotation as standardization would lead to a more efficient market for standardized bridge products;
- Simplify reporting and thereby reducing the workload for operations;
- Improve safety for own fleet;
- Improve situational awareness for bridge personnel and thereby improving the speed and efficiency of decision making;
- Increase navigational safety in VTS regulated areas;
- Provide a direction for product development to a wide market;
- Provide opportunity for new products and solutions;

For ship-borne users e-navigation will:

- Simplify daily work and training;
- Improve human-machine interface, usability, familiarity and navigational safety;
- Improve time-saving and efficiency on board by providing easier access to information, thereby improving the response time/problem solving abilities of bridge personnel;
- Improved navigational safety by reducing the administrative workload;
- Improve confidence in the use of navigational equipment;
- Enhance the quality, accuracy and reliability of information, thereby improving situational awareness and navigational safety;
- Provide easy access to need-to-know information in a user friendly single window;
- Improve familiarity with systems through standardization;
- Improve service and safety in VTS-regulated areas by providing easy access to available services and warnings
- Reduce bureaucracy and thereby support more efficient use of bridge resources;
- Reduce the risk of accidents;

== e-navigation strategy ==
The IMO entrusted Norway and the Norwegian Coastal Administration to coordinate the work of developing a proposal for an e-navigation strategy implementation plan. Three sub-committees within the IMO – NAV, COMSAR and STW – established working groups on e-navigation; each group was chaired by John Erik Hagen of the Norwegian Coastal Administration. Further, a correspondence group overseen by the Norwegian Coastal Administration had an ongoing role in gathering input from national maritime administrations to proposals and decisions related to the process of establishing an e-navigation Strategy Implementation Plan (SIP).

The work on an e-navigation Strategy Implementation Plan was broken down into several clear phases:

1. Assessing user needs
2. Constructing an open, modular and scalable architecture
3. Completing a series of studies: a gap analysis, cost-benefit analysis and a risk analysis

=== Strategy Implementation Plan (SIP) ===
With these phases complete, five agreed solutions were proposed to provide the basis for a Strategy Implementation Plan. These are:

S1: improved, harmonized and user friendly bridge design;

S2: means for standardized and automated reporting;

S3: improved reliability, resilience and integrity of bridge equipment and navigation information;

S4: integration and presentation of available information in graphical displays received via communications equipment; and

S9: improved communication of VTS Service Portfolio.

S1, S3 and S4 address the equipment and its use on the ship, while S2 and S9 address improved communications between ships and ship to shore and shore to ship. During the development of the SIP a number of tasks have been identified in order to continue the further development and implementation of e-navigation. Some of these tasks may require further consideration and investigation before taking a final decision on the best way forward and subsequent tasks. Further it was recognised that there is a need to identify shore-based functions and services. At present, there are many different types of services in most given situations or locations, such as ports, coastal and high seas. Harmonising and standardising these services results in the Maritime Service Portfolios (MSPs).

=== Core elements to the plan ===
The final e-Navigation Strategy Implementation Plan contains eight core elements, defined thus:

1. Identification of tasks needed to be completed to satisfy the Solutions
2. A phasing of the tasks and a high level roadmap
3. A list of Maritime Service Portfolios that need to be developed
4. A list of key enablers of e-navigation
5. The continual assessment of user needs
6. Proposals for a systematic assessment of how new technology can best meet defined and evolving user needs in the longer term
7. Proposals on public relations and promotion of the e-navigation concept to key stakeholder groups
8. Identification of potential sources of funding for development and implementation, particularly for developing regions and countries and of actions to secure that funding.

=== Guidelines ===
The combination of the five e-navigation solutions, and the three guidelines, Guidelines on Human Centred Design (HCD) for e-navigation, Guidelines on Usability Testing, Evaluation and Assessment (U-TEA) for e-navigation systems and Guidelines for Software Quality Assurance (SQA) in e-navigation, proposes an e-navigation implementation that facilitates a holistic approach to the interaction between shipboard and shore-based users.

== Way forward ==
The SIP was presented to the new IMO sub-committee NCSR (Navigation Communication Search and Rescue) in June 2014 for endorsement, and forwarded from there to the Maritime Safety Committee where it was approved in November 2014. Along with work taking place under the aegis of the IMO, a number of public and private groups are working to advance e-navigation and topics related to e-navigation.
