= Inland Electronic Navigational Charts =

Inland Electronic Navigational Charts (IENC) are electronic navigational charts for rivers, canals, lakes and other inland waters which are navigable. IENCs are displayed by an Inland Electronic Chart Display and Information System (Inland ECDIS).

== Europe ==
Based on the findings of the European transport R&D project INDRIS (Inland Navigation Demonstrator for River Information Services) and the German project ARGO in 2001, both the Danube and the Rhine Commissions adopted an Inland Electronic Chart Display and Information Systems (Inland ECDIS) standard for IENC data and system requirements for the Rhine and the Danube Rivers. In 2001, the Economic Commission for Europe of the United Nations (UN ECE) adopted the Inland ECDIS Standard as a recommendation for the European inland waterway system.

As of November 2013, Inland ENC data conforming to the Inland ECDIS standard have been produced covering almost 10000 kilometers on European rivers/waterways including the: Rhine, Danube, Mosel, Neckar, Main, Scheldt, Garonne, Elbe, Sava and Drava Rivers and the Main-Danube Canal in Germany, the Netherlands, France, Belgium, Switzerland, Austria, Slovakia, Hungary, Croatia, Serbia, Bulgaria, Romania and the Ukraine.

Russia has produced more than 270 ENCs covering 2600 kilometers of the inland waterways.

Private companies are co-operating in producing complete Inland ENC coverage for remaining European navigable waterways. In addition, ECDIS and ECS equipment manufacturers that are active on the European inland waterways have upgraded their software to use Inland ENC data. At present, there are more than 5000 commercial vessels and 6000 pleasure craft in Europe using Inland ENC data.

== United States ==
The 1993 Big Bayou Canot train wreck of September 22, 1993 was the worst train wreck in the history of the United States passenger railroad company Amtrak. Investigation of this accident produced recommendations by the National Transportation Safety Board, the United States National Academy of Sciences, and the American Waterway Operators that the U.S. Army Corps of Engineers support production of low cost electronic navigation for the Inland River System. This recommendation was followed by Congress directing and funding the Corps to develop and publish electronic chart data for the inland waterways. The Corps began with pilot projects for the Atchafalaya River in Louisiana and for the lower Mississippi River near Vicksburg, Mississippi.

The U.S. Army Corps of Engineers developed Inland Electronic Navigation Charts (IENCs) on much of the 8,200 miles of rivers in the U.S. Inland River System. This initiative began in 2001 in response to demand from the inland navigation industry and new capability of technology with small computers and availability of accurate GPS/DGPS positioning. These IENCs are also possible because of accurate and up-to-date survey and chart data collected by the Corps for waterway maintenance and construction.

IENCs for the Mississippi, Ohio, Red, Atchafalaya, Illinois, Tennessee, Cumberland, Monongahela, Kanawha, Green Rivers and the Black Warrior/Tombigbee system have been produced and are available for public access via the Internet. Similar to Europe, several North American ECDIS and ECS equipment manufacturers now offer systems capable of using Inland ENC data.

Inland navigation in the U.S. has some fundamental distinctions from coastal, deep-draft navigation, which could translate to unique application and specialized documents for the future IENCs. IENCs now encompass the Mississippi, Ohio and other major river systems.

IENCs have very consistent features, e.g. scale, accuracy, and update frequency, to a greater level than current chart books produced by the Corps districts. The electronic products will also follow the international S-57 exchange format for consistency with efforts in other countries and compatibility with Electronic Chart Display and Information Systems (ECDIS) and electronic chart systems (ECS).

== International harmonisation ==
While there are some differences between the North American and European inland waterways, there are far more similarities. A North American - European Inland ENC Workshop was held in 2003 in conjunction with a Conference on River Information Services (RIS) organized by the European R&D-project COMPRIS (Consortium Operational Management Platform River Information Services). In addition to informing participants on the status of standards development and projects being conducted, a key objective was to discuss the benefits of harmonizing Inland ENC data standards between Europe and North America.

=== Inland ENC Harmonization Group ===
The international Inland ENC Harmonization Group (IEHG) was formed in 2003 to facilitate the development of international standards for Inland ENC data. The Russian Federation, Brazil, People's Republic of China, South Korea, Venezuela and Peru have joined the IEHG in the meantime. In 2009 IEHG has been recognized as a Non-Governmental International Organization (NGIO) by the International Hydrographic Organization (IHO). The IEHG is composed of representatives from government, industry and academia. The IEHG meets once per year. However, most of the work is accomplished via e-mail correspondence.

The goal of the IEHG is to agree upon specifications for Inland ENCs that are suitable for all known inland ENC data requirements for safe and efficient navigation for European, North and South American, Russian and Asian inland waterways. However, it is intended that this standard meet the basic needs for Inland ENC applications, worldwide. As such, the Inland ENC standard is flexible enough to accommodate additional inland waterway requirements in other regions of the world.

== See also ==
- Nautical chart
