= CIRM =

CIRM may refer to:

- California Institute for Regenerative Medicine
- Comité International Radio-Maritime, an international technical association of companies involved in the marine electronics industry
- Centre International de Rencontres Mathématiques, a French mathematical institute devoted to research and the organisation of workshops
