= S63 =

S63 may refer to:

== Aviation ==
- Savoia-Marchetti S.63, an Italian flying boat
- Sikorsky S-63, an American helicopter
- Skyharbor Airport, in Dallas County, Alabama, United States

== Other uses ==
- S-63 (encryption standard), securing electronic navigational chart data
- S63 (Long Island bus), United States
- BMW S63, an automobile engine
- INS Sindhurakshak (S63), a submarine of the Indian Navy
- Mercedes-Benz S63 AMG, a German sedan
- S63: In case of accident by inhalation: remove casualty to fresh air and keep at rest, a safety phrase
- Spanish submarine Marsopa (S 63)
- S63, a postcode district for Rotherham, England
