= Ministry of Maritime Affairs, Transport and Infrastructure =

Ministry of the Croatian government

Ministry of Maritime Affairs, Transport and Infrastructure Ministarstvo mora, prometa i infrastrukture

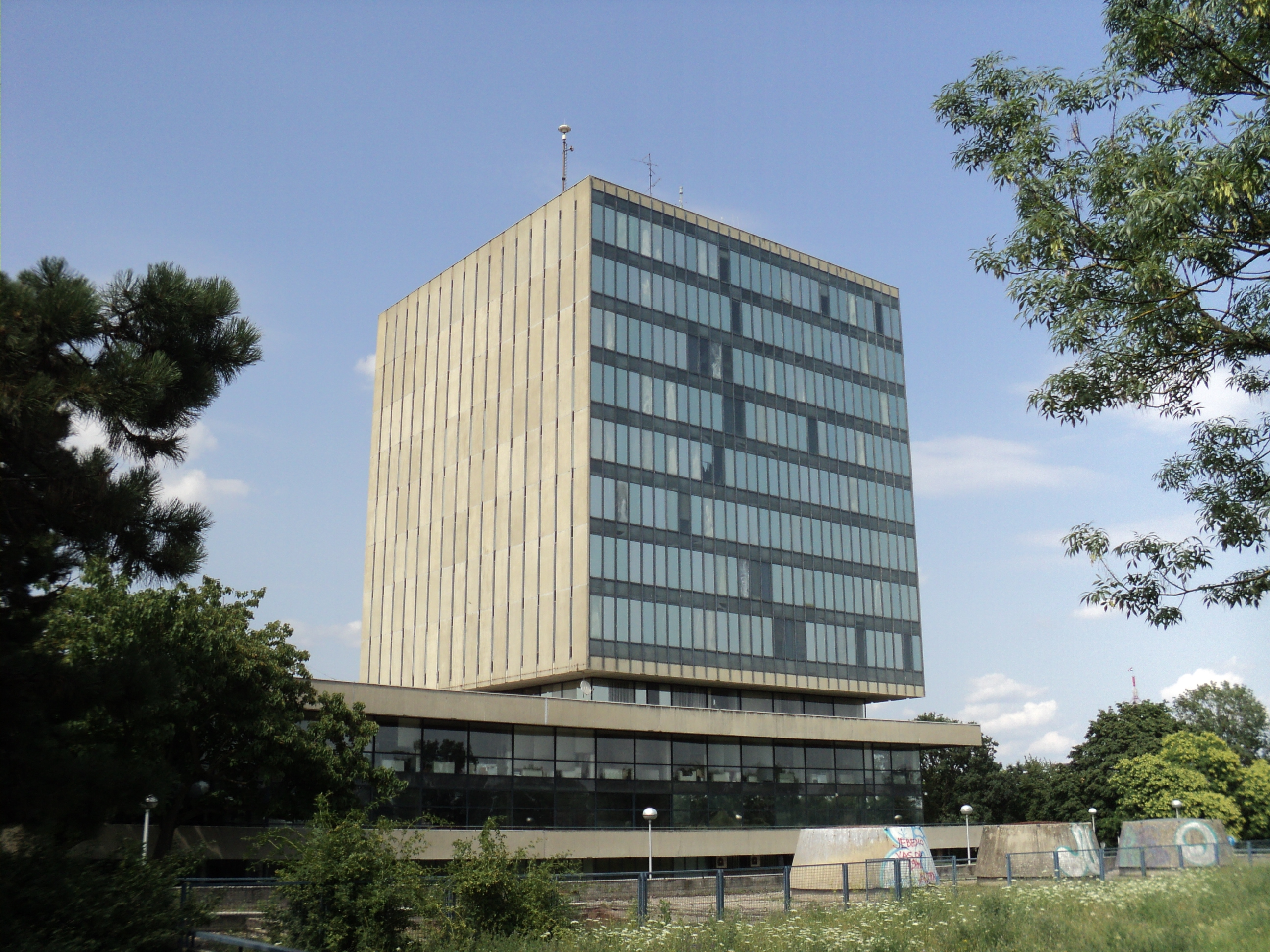
- The Kockica building, headquarters of the Ministry

Ministry overview
- Formed: 31 May 1990; 36 years ago
- Type: Ministry in the Government of Croatia
- Jurisdiction: Croatia
- Headquarters: Prisavlje 14, Zagreb, Croatia
- Employees: 1,115 (2025)
- Budget: €2.04 billion (2026)
- Website: mmpi.gov.hr

Minister
- Currently: Oleg Butković since 22 January 2016

The Ministry of Maritime Affairs, Transport and Infrastructure of the Republic of Croatia (Croatian: Ministarstvo mora, prometa i infrastrukture, MMPI RH) is a ministry in the Government of Croatia.

== Role ==
The Ministry of Maritime Affairs, Transport and Infrastructure performs administrative and other tasks related to:

- domestic international maritime, nautical, road, rail, air and postal traffic; the system of transport by cable cars, funiculars and lifts and transport on inland waters with the infrastructure of these modes of transport;
- planning, drafting and implementation of strategic documents and transport infrastructure projects, proposes a strategy for the development of all modes of transport;
- protection of the sea from pollution from ships; seaports, maritime domain and delimitation of maritime domain, maritime insurance and maritime agencies; ports on inland waterways; land freight transport centers; airports;
- means of transport other than those falling within the scope of work of other ministries;
- inspection activities: safety of navigation at sea, domestic and international road traffic and roads, except for activities within the scope of the Ministry of the Interior, safety of railway transport, safety of lifts, cable cars and lifts, safety of air navigation and safety of navigation on inland waters
- electronic communications, information society (except activities within the scope of other central state administration bodies) and postal services, preparation of draft laws and other regulations in the field of electronic communications and postal services, ensuring and implementing established policy and application of laws and other regulations in the field of electronic communications and postal services, drafting strategies, strategic plans, studies, guidelines and programs for the development of electronic communications and postal services in the Republic of Croatia and drafting plans for their implementation, drafting analyzes and reports and preparing proposals for measures and plans for developing and improving electronic communications and postal services and in domestic and international postal traffic, preparation of draft laws and other regulations in the field of radio equipment and electromagnetic compatibility, cooperation in monitoring, determining and analyzing indicators of development of information and communication technologies (ICT), especially broadband services and technologies, drafting measures and plans to encourage the development and improvement of the market in ICT services and infrastructure, with special emphasis on broadband services and technologies, drafting the position of the Republic of Croatia, expert bases, analysis, reports, plans and other documents for the purpose of performing European affairs in the field of electronic communications, information society, radio equipment, electromagnetic compatibility and postal services, participation in European and international organizations and institutions and working bodies of the Council of the European Union electronic communications, information society and postal services, participation in interstate meetings and negotiations in the field of electronic communications, information society and postal services, cooperation in the preparation and drafting of proposals for international treaties, agreements and conventions in the field of electronic communications, information society and postal services and the preparation of draft laws on the ratification of these international acts

The Ministry of Maritime Affairs, Transport and Infrastructure performs administrative, professional and other tasks related to:

- organizing the development of strategic infrastructure projects and investment programs for all modes of transport, of special importance to the Republic of Croatia and preparing proposals to the Government of the Republic of Croatia for their approval and implementation;
- organization of appropriate large infrastructure investment works in the construction of transport infrastructure facilities and devices, except for their reconstruction and maintenance, and other appropriate major infrastructure works important for sustainable development of the Republic of Croatia which are fully or largely financed from the state budget; entities in the construction of such facilities and monitors and controls these investments,
- and performs professional tasks related to the initiation, harmonization and supervision of activities determined by acts and regulations governing the overall development of traffic.

== Organization ==
The Ministry of Maritime Affairs, Transport and Infrastructure has a total of 1,115 staff (as of December 2025), working in the following departments:

Department	Croatian language	Staff
Cabinet of the Minister	Kabinet Ministra	14
General Secretariat	Glavno tajništvo	80
Maritime Administration	Uprava pomorstva	49
Directorate for Maritime Safety	Uprava za sigurnost plovidbe	557
Inland navigation Directorate	Uprava unutarnje plovidbe	58
Directorate for Railway Infrastructure and Transport	Uprava za željezničku infrastrukturu i promet	47
Directorate for Air Transport, Electronic Communications and Post	Uprava zračnog prometa, elektroničkih komunikacija i pošte	43
Directorate for Road Traffic, Road Infrastructure and Inspection	Uprava za cestovni promet, cestovnu infrastrukturu i inspekciju	52
Directorate for EU Funds and Strategic Planning	Uprava za EU fondove i strateško planiranje	70
Directorate for Budget and Finance	Uprava za proračun i financije	42
Inspectorate for Road Traffic and Road Safety	Inspektorat sigurnosti cestovnog prometa i cesta	74
Independent Sector for Foreign and European Affairs and Public Relations	Samostalni sektor za vanjske i europske poslove i odnose s javnošću	22
Independent Internal Audit Service	Samostalna služba za unutarnju reviziju	7

== List of ministers ==
Minister	Party	Term start	Term end	Days in office
Josip Božičević	HDZ	25 July 1990	12 August 1992	749
Ivica Mudrinić	HDZ	12 August 1992	5 February 1996	1,272
Željko Lužavec	HDZ	5 February 1996	4 August 1999	1,276
Ivan Pavlović	HDZ	4 August 1999	27 January 2000	176
Alojz Tušek	HSLS	27 January 2000	21 March 2002	784
Mario Kovač	HSLS	21 March 2002	30 July 2002	131
Roland Žuvanić	LIBRA	30 July 2002	23 December 2003	511
Božidar Kalmeta	HDZ	23 December 2003	23 December 2011	2,922
Zlatko Komadina	SDP	23 December 2011	4 April 2012	103
Zdenko Antešić (acting)	SDP	4 April 2012	18 April 2012	14
Siniša Hajdaš Dončić	SDP	18 April 2012	22 January 2016	1,374
Oleg Butković	HDZ	22 January 2016	Incumbent	3,847

== Officials ==
Currently serving officials at the Ministry:

=== Minister ===
- Oleg Butković, Minister of Maritime Affairs, Transport and Infrastructure

=== State Secretaries ===
- Tomislav Mihotić, State Secretary for Road Traffic, Road Infrastructure and Inspection and Air Transport (državni tajnik za cestovni promet, cestovnu infrastrukturu i inspekciju i zračni promet)
- Žarko Tušek, State Secretary for Railway Infrastructure, Transport, Electronic Communications and Post (državni tajnik za željezničku infrastrukturu, promet, elektroničke komunikacije i poštu)

=== Directors of management ===
- Nina Perko, Director of the Maritime Administration (Ravnateljica Uprave pomorstva)
- Duška Kunštek, Director of the Inland Navigation Directorate (Ravnateljica Uprave unutarnje plovidbe)
- Siniša Orlić, Director of the Directorate for Navigation Safety (Ravnatelj Uprave sigurnosti plovidbe)
- Jasna Divić, Director of the Directorate for Railway Infrastructure and Transport (Ravnateljica Uprave za željezničku infrastrukturu i promet)
- Krešo Antonović, Director of the Directorate of Air Transport, Electronic Communications and Post (Ravnatelj Uprave zračnog prometa, elektroničkih komunikacije i pošte)
- Dražen Antolović, Director of the Directorate for Road Traffic, Road Infrastructure and Inspection (Ravnatelj Uprave za cestovni promet, cestovnu infrastrukturu i inspekciju)
- Damir Šoštarić, Director of the Directorate for EU Funds and Strategic Planning (Ravnatelj Uprave za EU fondove i strateško planiranje)
- Melita Štrbić, Director of the Directorate for Budget and Finance (Ravnatelj Uprave za proračun i financije)

== See also ==
- Port captaincies of the Republic of Croatia
- Hydrographic Institute of the Republic of Croatia
- Inhabited Islands of Croatia
- Transport in Croatia
- Croatian Railways
- Hrvatske ceste
- Hrvatske autoceste
