= Port captaincies of the Republic of Croatia =

Government agency of Croatia

Racing stripes of the Lučke kapetanije.

Administrative signal.

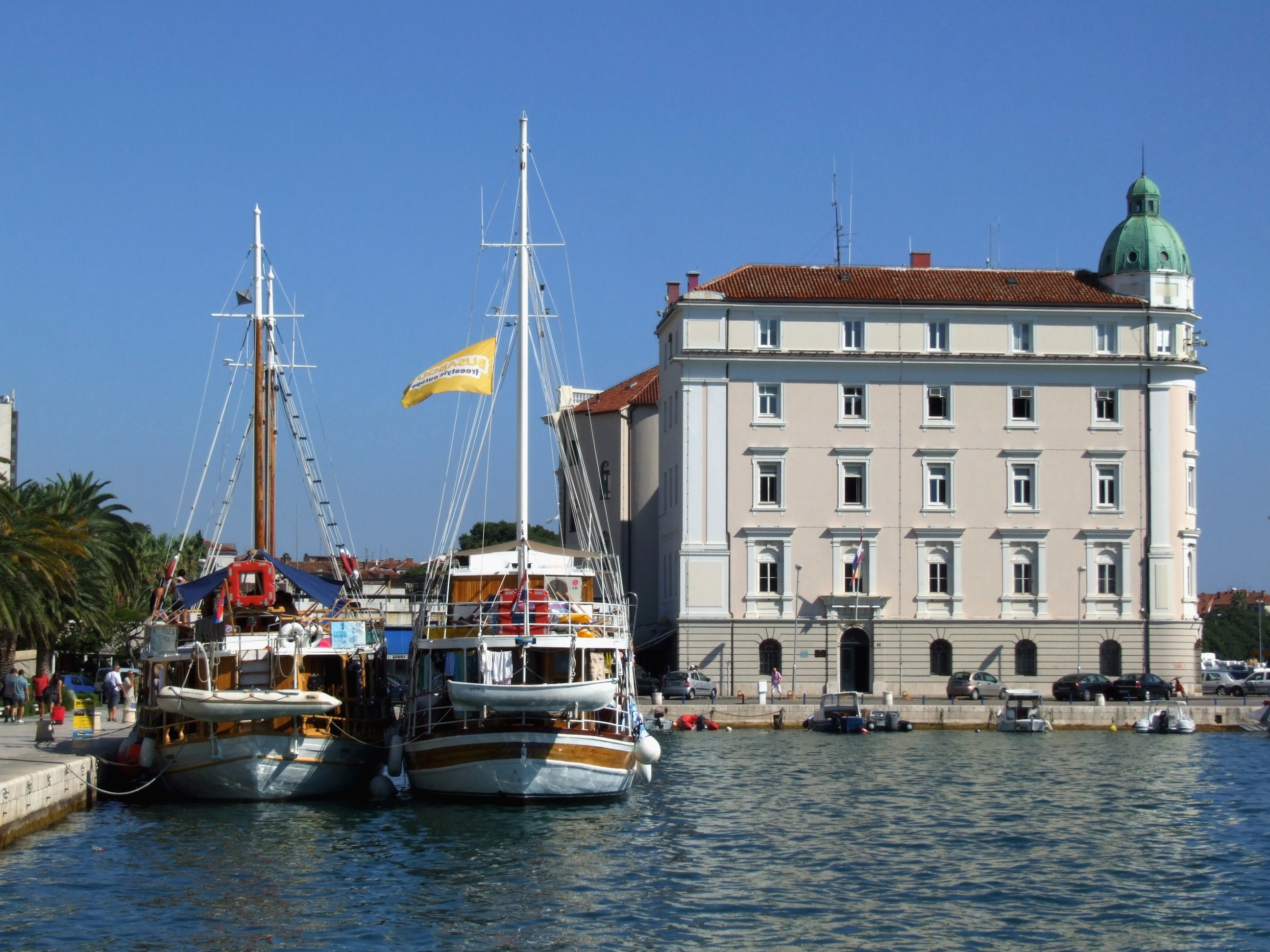
Port captaincy building in Split.

The port captaincies (Croatian: Lučke kapetanije), also referred to as the harbormasters' offices, are a civilian administration of the Croatian Ministry of the Sea, Transport and Infrastructure with authority to control navigation in the internal and territorial waters of the Republic of Croatia, actions of search and rescue on sea, inspection of navigation safety, inspection of the maritime domain, registration and deletion of vessels as well as organizing a register of vessels. Additional tasks include establishing a vessels’ ability to navigate, tonnage measurement of ships, handing out of documents necessary for navigation, establishing the level of proficiency in case of professionals employed in the maritime transport etc.

There are eight port captaincy offices in Croatia: in Pula, Rijeka, Senj, Zadar, Šibenik, Split, Ploče and Dubrovnik.

== Boats ==
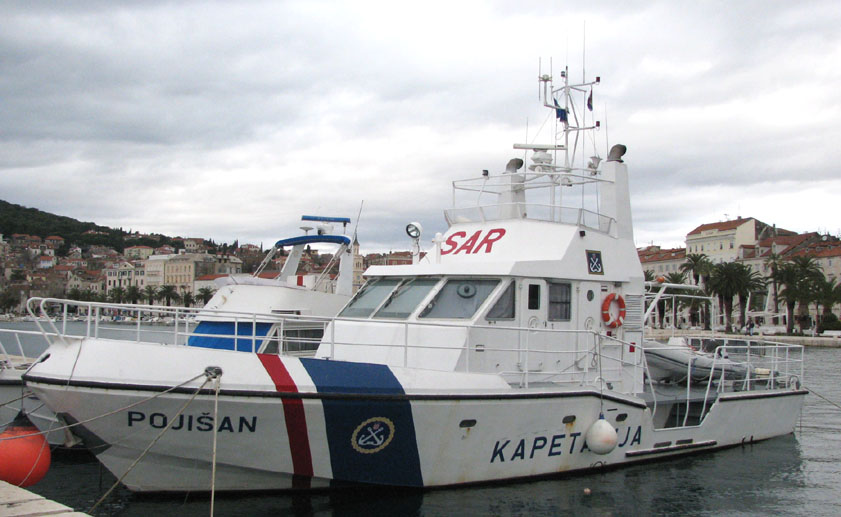

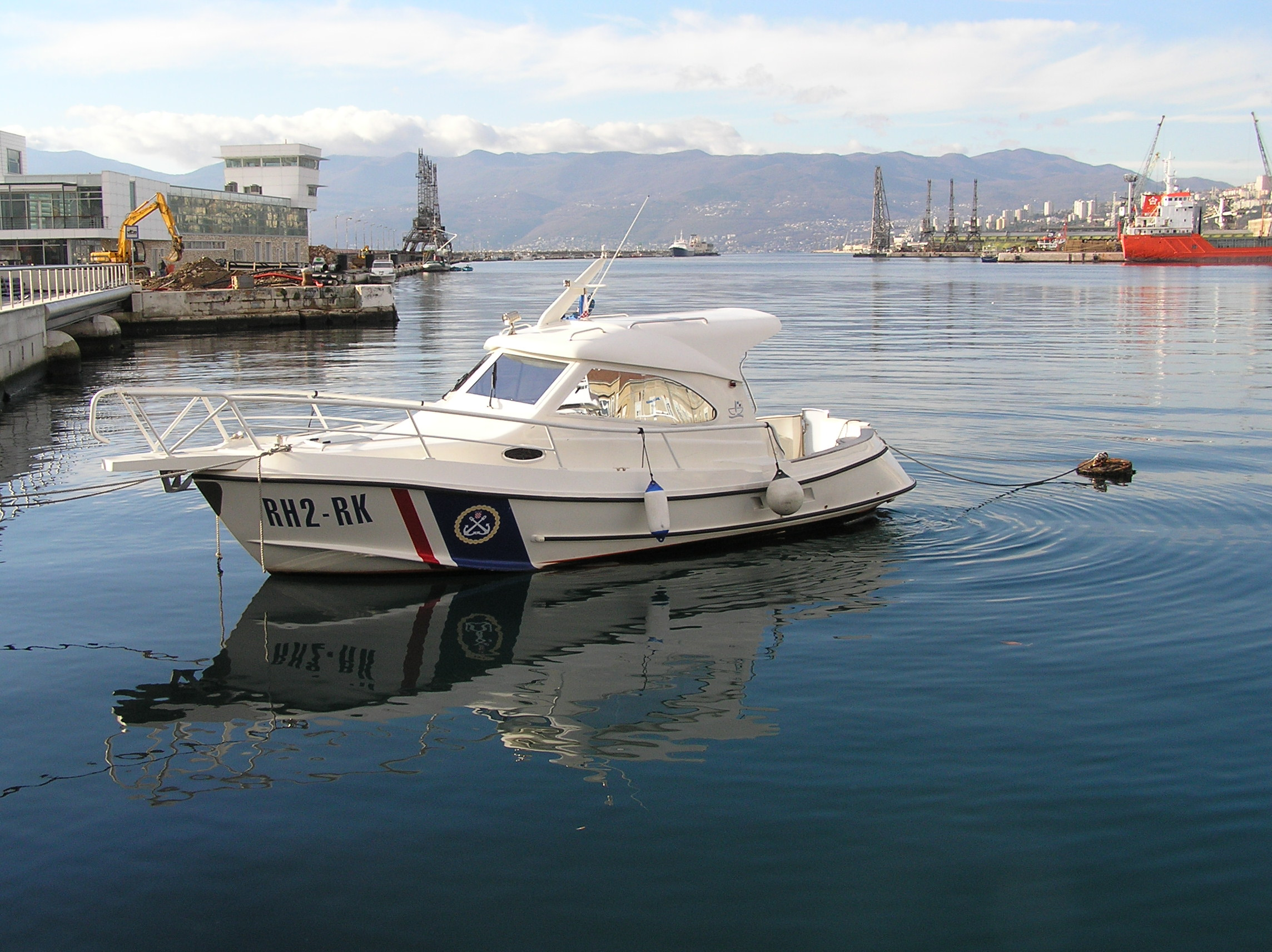

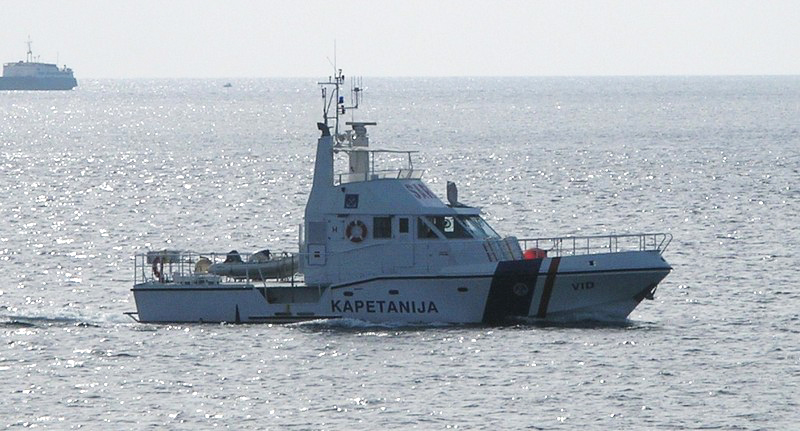

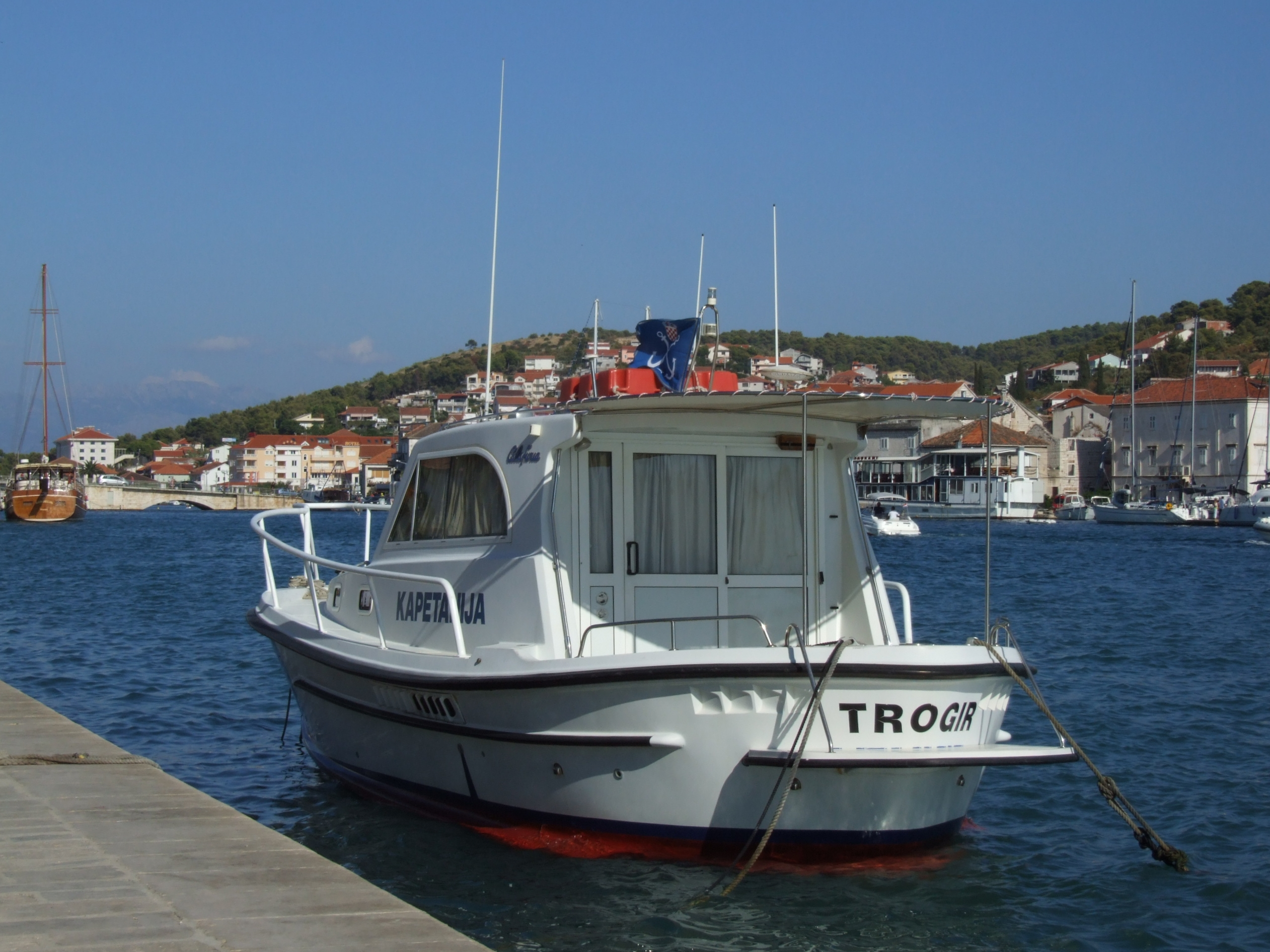

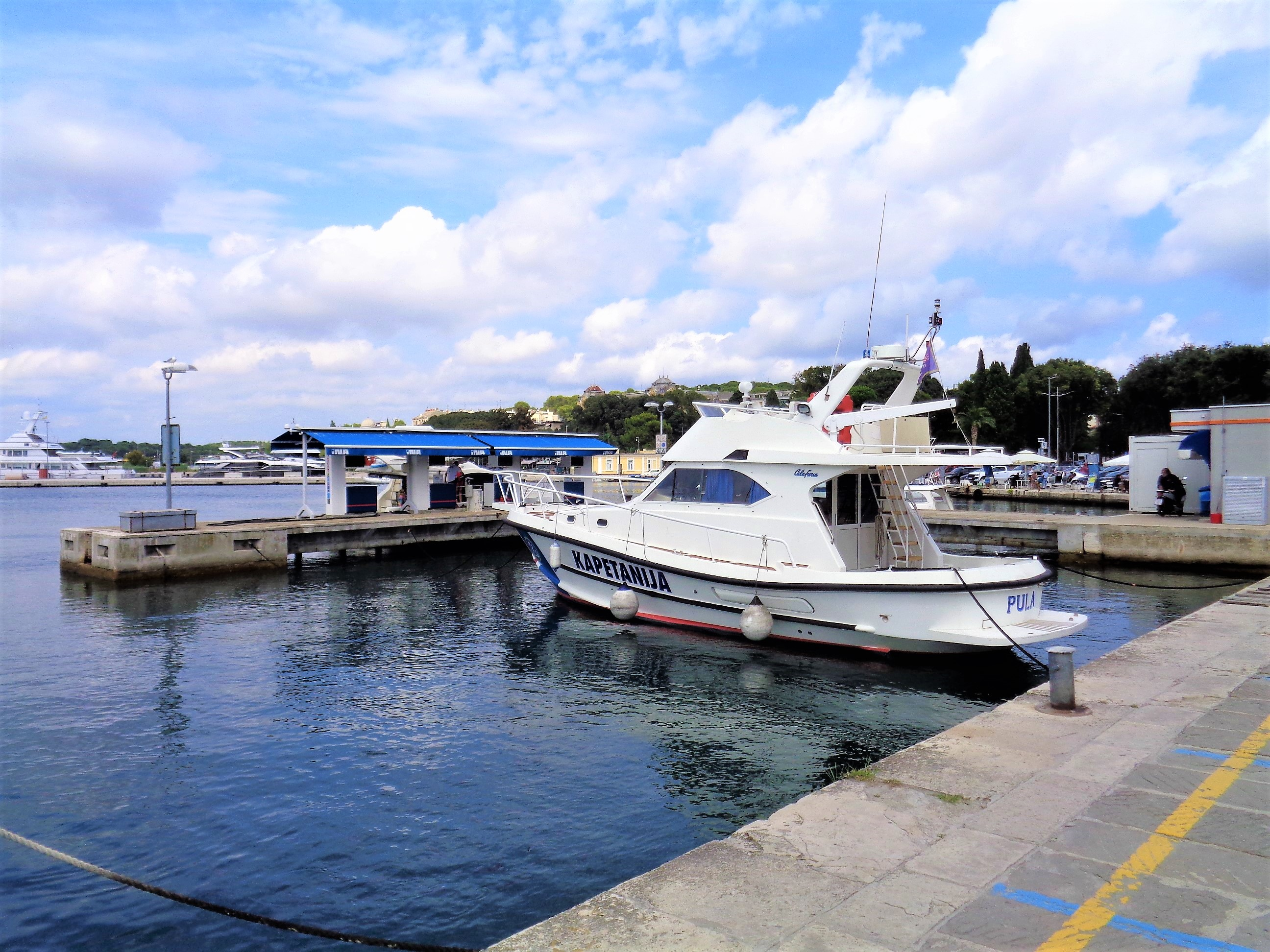
Pula

== See also ==
- Croatian Coast Guard
