= Hydrographic Institute of the Republic of Croatia =

Research institute in Split, Croatia

Coordinates: 43.5223°N 16.4321°E

- Hrvatski Hidrografski Institut

Agency overview
- Formed: 1992
- Headquarters: Zrinsko-Frankopanska 161 Split, Croatia HR-21000
- Minister responsible: Oleg Butković
- Agency executive: Vinka Kolić, Director
- Parent agency: Ministry of Maritime Affairs, Transport and Infrastructure
- Website: https://www.hhi.hr

The Hydrographic Institute of the Republic of Croatia is a government agency responsible for providing hydrographic and marine geospatial data for the Republic of Croatia. The institute is located in Split, and covers scientific research and development, services related to the safety of navigation, the hydrographic-geodetic survey of the Adriatic sea, marine geodesy, design and publication of nautical charts and books, oceanographic research, and submarine geology research. The Croatian Hydrographic Institute is responsible for the development of navigational safety service in the Adriatic, within the worldwide navigational safety system, and in cooperation with the Ministry of the Sea, Transport and Infrastructure, port authorities, the Croatian Navy, lighthouse authorities, and hydrographic offices of all maritime countries, following internationally agreed standards.

The institute is crucial to Croatia's presence on the Adriatic, providing a basis for the development of a strong, sustainable maritime economy as part of the national economy. Part of the institute's mission states that "we pave the way for safe traffic of people and goods in the Croatian part of the Adriatic, for management of the sea and seabed resources, for safeguard and protection of the environment"

== History ==
Sea-trading around the Adriatic and the wider Mediterranean basin has been a feature of coastal life since ancient times. Over time, navigational knowledge has been built up of favourable routes, channels, shelters, and harbours. Many early aids to navigation have been preserved, such as nautical charts, portolans, and coastal descriptions with warnings to mariners, but they were not accurate until the advent of scientifically based hydrographic surveys.

The first of these in the Adriatic was by the French hydrographer Beautemps-Beaupré, as he conducted surveys of the East Adriatic ports, bays and channels, between 1806 and 1809. To mark the 200th anniversary of that survey, the Croatian Hydrological Institute published a special edition entitled "Eastern Adriatic in the Work of Beautemps-Beaupré".

The survey and research of the Eastern Adriatic continued under the Hydrographic Office of the Austro-Hungarian Navy, which was founded in Trieste in 1860. They produced navigational charts at different scales (general, coastal, and harbour charts), nautical publications (pilot books, lists of lights, descriptions of coasts), and scientific papers dealing with astronomy, meteorology, oceanography, gravimetry, and geomagnetism.

Following the break-up of Austria-Hungary, the activities restarted at the Hydrographic Institute of the Kingdom of Yugoslavia which set up several centres along the coast:: Tivat (1922), Dubrovnik (1923), Split (1929), during the Second World War in Hvar (1943), Vis (1944) and Monopoli (1944), then finally back to Split (1944) at the end of the war. At that time, the Hydrological service was restructured to include nautical, hydrographic, geodetic, oceanographic, aero-photogrammetric, cartographic, meteorological, and reproduction departments. Through cooperation with hydrographic institutes of other maritime countries and its membership of the International Hydrographic Organization since 1922, the institute has achieved valuable results and worldwide reputation.

During the Croatian War of Independence, all the resources of the Institute were preserved, including archived data, equipment and instruments. Today's Hydrographic Institute of Croatia is a modern scientific institution keeping up to date with current technological trends, following the recommendations of the IHO.

After the recognition of Croatia as an independent state, the Croatian Parliament established the National Hydrographic Institute on 10 April 1992. The Croatian Hydrographic Activity Act (Official Gazette No. 68/98, 110/98, 163/03 and 71/14) restructured the Institute as a public institution under the name of Hydrographic Institute of the Republic of Croatia (HHI), effective as from 5 January 2000.

== Hydrographic survey ==
The Hydrographic Institute carries out hydrographic surveys of maritime areas within the borders of Croatia, including bathymetric survey, geodetic survey and recording of features in the coastal area, sea and seabed, marine geology and geophysics, oceanography, and protection of the marine environment as relates to hydrography and navigational safety at sea. The institute has two survey vessels designed and equipped for hydrographic survey, oceanographic measurements, marine geology research, magnetometric detection of the coastal and insular sea areas in the Adriatic Sea. The smaller "SV Hydra" is used in survey operations in the coastal and inshore areas of the Croatian part of the Adriatic Sea. The larger SV "Palagruža" is capable of operating under more severe conditions for longer periods, and is therefore used in the open sea, including the wider Mediterranean Sea.

== Safety of navigation and cartography ==
The institute is responsible for producing hydrographical information to ensure the navigational safety of maritime vessels. This includes the radio navigational warning service, the collection and analysis of hydrographic and navigational information required for the official navigational charts and publications, as well as posting regular updates in Notices to Mariners.

The institute is the National Coordinator for the reception, analysis, processing and distribution of Maritime Safety Information (MSI). In addition, it is responsible for the describing and plotting of a surveyed limit of maritime sovereignty of the Republic of Croatia, taking into account other regulations governing national border.

=== Nautical charts ===
One of the primary activities of the institute is the production and maintenance of nautical charts in both paper and digital (ENC) formats. Each nautical chart represents a specific navigation area with the set purpose of ensuring the safe navigation of ships.

Charts published by the Croatian Hydrological Institute include:

- Overview charts – Adriatic Sea, Ionian Sea, and other parts of the Mediterranean Sea
- General charts – Adriatic Sea and a part of the Ionian Sea
- Coastal charts – Eastern Adriatic Sea
- Approach charts – parts of Eastern Adriatic Sea
- Harbour charts – major Eastern Adriatic ports, harbours, anchorages, and channels
- Berthing charts – major ports and harbours in the Croatian part of Eastern Adriatic
- Thematic charts – special charts to be used with Nautical charts

Official electronic navigational charts (ENC) issued by the Hydrographic Institute of the Republic of Croatia are available through PRIMAR RENC (regional ENC coordinating centre) and its network of authorised distributors.

=== Publications ===
Navigational publications are produced as occasional publications (Sailing Directions, Lists of Lights and Fog Signals, Nautical Tables, Radio Service) or as periodicals (Nautical Almanac, Tide Tables). These publications are based on the data collected by the institute, and other entities engaged in the safety of navigation, and produced according to the guidelines of the International Hydrographic Organization.

Other publications include different scientific and technical editions covering maritime services, navigation, shipbuilding, maritime law, nautical tourism and economy, as well as Special editions series dealing with the history of navigation, hydrography and cartography in the Adriatic.

=== Service catalogue ===
The Institute service catalogue includes the following services:

- Bathymetric Survey
- Survey of Coastal Structures
- Marine Geodesy
- Survey of Seabed Features
- Measurement of Sea Level Heights
- Measurement of Wind Generated Surface Waves
- Measurement of Sea Currents
- Measurement of Sea Water Thermohaline Properties
- Submarine Geology
- Measurement of Sea Water Transparency and Colour
- Measurement of Sea Water Chemical Parameters

=== E-services ===
- Notice to Mariners
- Radio Navigational Warnings
- Register of Hydrographic Surveys
- GeoAdriatic – marine geospatial data portal
- Adriatic Sea – operational oceanography portal

== Projects ==
The Hydrological Institute is involved in multi-disciplinary projects, mainly with respect to the safety of navigation, as well as other sea-related topics such as tourism, protection of the environment, hydro-technical projects, and oil and gas exploitation. The Institute participates in the scientific projects of the Ministry of Science and Education, either independently or in cooperation with other scientific institutions, and has been involved in several cross-border projects.

- EU Project CoRE is a cross-border initiative of joint research and awareness of environmental conditions, nature and cultural heritage protection in the Dubrovačko-neretvanska County (Croatia) and Montenegrin coastal area.
- EU Project JASPPER is a cross-border cooperation with Montenegro aimed at reducing pollution and preserving the marine ecosystem in the sea areas of Dubrovnik and Montenegro.
- EU Project NauTour is a cross-border joint promotion and increased level of safety in nautical tourism in Dubrovnik-Neretva County and the Montenegrin Coast.
- Small, occasionally inhabited or uninhabited islands and islets (MPNNOo) is a project to protect the interests and use of the 688 islands and islets from inappropriate and unplanned sale and development.
- Place of Refuge is a project to carry out research into resolving the regulatory and technical issues for granting place of refuge to ships in need of assistance in the event of maritime accidents or other emergencies, and threats to ships safety or the environment.
- Adriatic sea level is a project to develop a database of tides and sea levels along the Croatian coast of the Adriatic, and supply information on tidal predictions for any location
- Living Archipelago in Croatia is a publication aimed at supporting the development of coastal and nautical tourism

== Library ==
Although the library of the Croatian Hydrographic Institute has been in operation since 1947, it also contains many earlier publications and charts dating from the foundation of the office in Trieste in 1860, and the subsequent offices in Pula, Tivat and Dubrovnik. The library, which is available for browsing online, holds approximately 9000 books, textbooks and periodicals in a variety of subjects related to geodesy, geophysics, geology, chemistry, meteorology, cartography, navigation, electronics, information science, and printmaking. The library also holds periodicals published by the Institute itself, dating back to the 1930s, such as Notices to Mariners, Nautical Almanac, Sailing Directions, List of Lights, Nautical Tables, Annual Report, and other publications and navigation handbooks. In addition, the library holds publications from the International Hydrographic Bureau (IHB), and a range of periodicals and charts from other hydrographic institutes and related institutions around the world.

== Exhibition ==
An exhibition space contains a history of hydrography in the area, and provides a view of the institute's activities over time, including some of the methods and instruments used. It preserves valuable archive materials and equipment, offering visitors a view of the development of hydrography in the Adriatic.

The exhibition space was formally opened on 14 November 2010 in the presence of the Croatian President Dr Ivo Josipović, and other special guests.

== See also ==
- International Hydrographic Organization (IHO)
- International Maritime Organization (IMO)
- International Association of Lighthouse Authorities (IALA)
