= S-100 (chart) =

S-100 is an international standard maintained by the International Hydrographic Organization (IHO) that applies to the geospatial data used in electronic navigational charts and supporting data sets. Several other international organizations that standardise the use of marine geospatial data now use S-100 as the basis for their data transfer standards.

History of the Development of S-100

S-100 is based on the International Organization for Standardization ISO 19100 series of geographic information standards as a replacement for the long-standing IHO S-57 data transfer standard. The concept of S-100 was conceived at the turn of the century by Barrie Greenslade of the United Kingdom Hydrographic Office (UKHO) and Don Vachon of the Canadian Hydrographic Service (CHS). Its development became part of the IHO work programme in 2001.

S-100 delivers the flexibility and extensibility lacking in the previously ground-breaking S-57 standard and provides a contemporary, internationally aligned data standard that enables much greater interoperability between hydrographic and other geospatial data sets in the maritime domain. Originally to be known as S-57 edition 4.0, S-100 was adopted as the title for the new data transfer standard in 2005 by the, then, IHO Committee on Hydrographic Requirements and Information Services (CHRIS) at its 17th meeting in September 2005. Greenslade, as the Chair of the IHO’s Transfer Standards and Applications Development Working Group (TSMAD), championed the development of S-100 over the following decade and a half, gathering ever-increasing levels of support from representatives of the IHO Member States, but most significantly, from a strong and committed group of expert contributors from industry.

S-100 is now the over-arching standard for the creation of a variety of dependent standards. These are usually in the form of a dependent product specification. A product specification defines a data product, and usually includes additional resources such as a machine readable feature catalogue and portrayal catalogue, a data encoding guide and at least one data encoding format. A list of known S-100 based product specifications is maintained on the IHO website.

Derived Standards

The IHO has developed a number of S-100 product specifications based on S-100. As of June 2026 they were:

- S-101 – ENC (Electronic Navigational Chart) Product Specification
- S-102 – Bathymetric Surface Product Specification
- S-104 – Water Level Information for Surface Navigation Product Specification
- S-111 – Surface Currents Product Specification
- S-121 – Maritime Limits and Boundaries Product Specification
- S-122 – Marine Protected Areas
- S-123 – Marine Radio Services
- S-124 – Navigational Warnings
- S-127 – Marine Traffic Management
- S-128 – Catalogue of Nautical Products
- S-129 – Under Keel Clearance Management
- S-130 – Polygonal Demarcations of Global Sea Areas
- S-131 – Marine Harbour Infrastructure

The International Organization for Marine Aids to Navigation (IALA) has developed a number of S-100 product specifications based on S-100. As of June 2026 they were:

- S-201 Aids to Navigation Information
- S-210 Inter-VTS Exchange Format
- S-211 Port Call Message Format
- S-212 VTS Digital Service
- S-230 Application Specific Messages
- S-240 DGNSS Station Almanac
- S-245 eLoran ASF Data
- S-246 eLoran Station Almanac
- S-247 Differential eLoran Reference Station Almanac

The Inland ENC Harmonization Group (IEHG) has developed S-100 product specifications based on S-100. As of June 2026 they were:

- S-401 IEHG Inland ENC
- S-402 IEHG Bathymetric Inland ENC

The World Meteorological Organization Service Commission (SERCOM) has developed several S-100 product specifications based on S-100. As of June 2026 they were:

- S-411 Dynamic Ice Information
- S-412 Marine Weather Warnings
- S-413 Marine Weather and Wave Conditions
- S-414 Marine Weather and Wave Observations

The International Electrotechnical Commission Technical Committee 80 (TC80) (IEC-TC80) has developed an S-100 product specifications based on S-100. As of June 2026 it was:

- S-421 Route Plan
