= S-63 (encryption standard) =

S-63 is an International Hydrographic Organization (IHO) standard for encrypting, securing and compressing electronic navigational chart (ENC) data.

The Data Protection Scheme was prepared by the IHO Data Protection Scheme Advisory Group, and was based on the protection scheme developed and operated by Primar as part of providing their protected ENC service. ECC (Electronic Chart Centre) and United Kingdom Hydrographic Office were the original contributing organizations. The UKHO has since left this arrangement and Primar is now operated exclusively by ECC.

The standard was adopted as the official IHO standard by the IHO member states in December 2002.

The S-63 standard secures data by encrypting the basic transfer database using the Blowfish algorithm, SHA-1-hashing the data based on a random key and adding a CRC32 check. The standard also defines the systems to develop permit files that are delivered to end-users of ENC data enabling them to decrypt the data and use it for navigation. It also defines the use of DSA format signatures to authenticate the data originator, however because of poor implementation of the standard by ECDIS hardware manufacturers, virtually all signing is performed centrally by the IHO which acts as the scheme administrator. Exceptions to this are a few smaller resellers such as AUSRenc operated by AHS.

Compression is achieved by applying the standard ZIP (file format) algorithm to the base and update ENC files, before encryption. The other files are not compressed.
