= Comité International Radio-Maritime =

Comité International Radio-Maritime (CIRM) is a non-profit international technical association of companies involved in the marine electronics industry.

== Background ==
CIRM was founded in Spain in 1928 by a coalition of eight companies involved in the maritime radio service. The organisation was reconstituted in Belgium in 1947 and later moved to London, where it is currently located close to the International Maritime Organization.

CIRM is accredited as a non-governmental organisation in consultative status to the International Maritime Organization (IMO).

== Functions ==
CIRM promotes the application of electronic technology to the shipping industry. The organisation provides technical and industrial advice to the international maritime regulatory organisations.

In accordance with ITU Recommendation ITU-R M.585-6, CIRM is responsible for issuing the Manufacturer ID component of the Numerical Identifier for AIS-SART, Man Overboard, and EPIRB devices.

CIRM administers the Code of Business Practice for Marine Accounting Authorities, within the framework of ITU Recommendation D.90. This Code identifies operational requirements for Accounting Authorities in maritime radio and satellite communications.

== Relationships with other organisations ==
- Sector Member of the International Telecommunication Union (ITU-R and ITU-T)
- Liaison Member of the International Organization for Standardization (ISO)
- Liaison Member of the International Electrotechnical Commission (IEC)
- Observer of the International Hydrographic Organization (IHO)
- Observer of the International Association of Lighthouse Authorities (IALA)
- Observer of the International Chamber of Shipping (ICS)
- Observer of the US Radiotechnical Commission for Maritime (RTCM)
- Observer of the Apptage (ICS)

Memorandums Of Understanding with IMPA - International Maritime Pilots Association, IMSO - International Mobile Satellite Organization, IALA - International Association of Lighthouse Authorities
