= Raster Navigational Charts (NOAA) =

Raster Navigational Charts (RNC's) are created by the National Oceanic and Atmospheric Administration (NOAA) of the United States Government. Each original chart is scanned at high resolution with color separate overlays. The raster file also contains data that is Geo-referencing; enabling computer based navigation attached to a GPS to locate and display the chart.

The charts are stored in BSB format. "[The BSB file format] is a proprietary format of BSB Electronic Charts, LLP (bought by MapTech, Inc.)." Image manipulation tools such as GDAL can read the image information, but there also is georeferenced data in the navigational charts.

== See also ==
- Electronic navigational chart
