= List of Member States of the International Hydrographic Organization =

As of August 2025, the International Hydrographic Organization (IHO) comprised 103 Member States, two of which are suspended because of their lapsed annual financial contribution. The IHO identifies its representative member organisations as the respective national hydrographic office(s). These organisations may themselves be part of wider national maritime or other administrations covering a larger range of tasks – such as the national organisations for transport, maritime regulation, environment, defence or oceanography. For example, in Norway and New Zealand the hydrographic offices are sub-organisations of the country's national geodata organisation; in the UK and France, they are part of the Ministry of Defence; in Finland the hydrographic Office is part of the department of transport. The up to date list of IHO Member States, their representative organisations and contact details are maintained in the IHO Yearbook - available at www.iho.int

== List ==
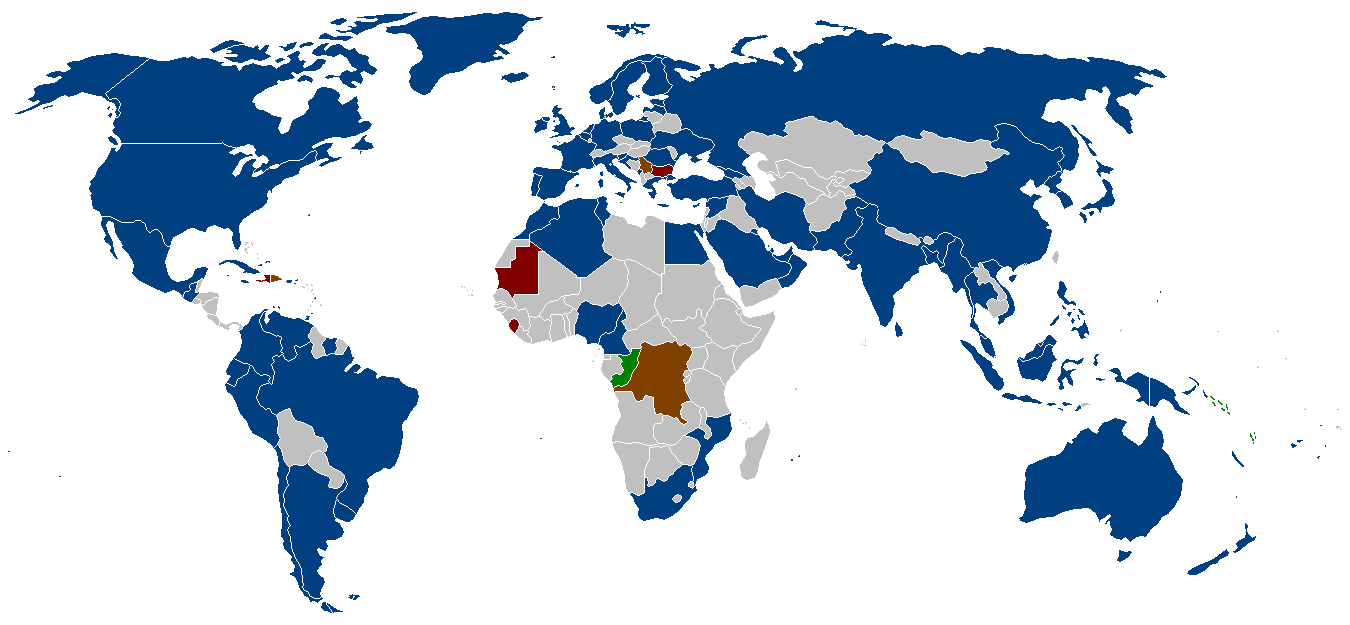
IHO member states (in blue)

- Albania – Albanian Hydrographic Service
- Algeria – Hydrographic Office of the Algerian National Navy
- Angola – Instituto Hidrografico e de Signalização Maritíma de Angola (IHSMA)
- Argentina – Argentine Naval Hydrographic Service
- Australia – Australian Hydrographic Service
- Bahamas – Grand Bahamas Port Authority
- Bahrain – Bahraini Hydrographic Survey Directorate
- Bangladesh – Bangladeshi Directorate of Hydrography
- Belgium – Flemish Hydrography
- Brazil – Brazilian Directorate of Hydrography and Navigation
- Brunei – Brunei Directorate of Hydrography and Navigation
- Bulgaria – Hydrographical Service at Ministry of Defense
- Cabo Verde – Instituto Maritimo Portuario (IMP)
- Cameroon – Autonomous Port of Douala
- Canada- Canadian Hydrographic Service
- Chile – Hydrographic and Oceanographic Service of the Chilean Navy
- China – Chinese Maritime Safety Administration
- Colombia – Colombian National Ministry of Defence, Colombian Navy, General Maritime Directorate
- Croatia – Hydrographic Institute of the Republic of Croatia
- Cuba – Cuban National Office of Hydrography and Geodesy
- Cyprus – Cypriotic National Hydrographic Committee, The Department of Lands and Surveys
- Democratic Republic of Congo – Ministry of Transport and Communications, Ports and Studies Division
- (North Korea) Democratic People's Republic of Korea – DPRK Hydrographic Department
- Denmark – Danish Geodata Agency
- Dominican Republic – Hydrographic Service of the Navy of the Dominican Republic
- Ecuador – Oceanographic Institute of the Ecuadorian Navy
- Egypt – Egyptian Navy Hydrographic Department
- Estonia – Estonian Maritime Administration (Aids to Navigation and Hydrography Division)
- Fiji – Republic of Fiji Navy Hydrographic Office
- Finland – Finnish Transport Agency Hydrographic Office
- France – Naval Hydrographic and Oceanographic Service
- Gambia – Gambia Ports Authority
- Georgia – State Hydrographic Service of Georgia
- Germany – Federal Maritime and Hydrographic Agency of Germany
- Ghana – Maritime Authority, Ministry of Transport
- Greece – Hellenic Navy Hydrographic Service
- Guatemala – Guatemalan Ministry of Defence, General Directorate of Maritime Affairs
- Guyana – Maritime Administration Department
- Iceland – Icelandic Coast Guard Hydrographic Department
- India – Indian Naval Hydrographic Department
- Indonesia – Indonesian Hydro-Oceanographic Service
- Iran – Iranian Ports and Maritime Organisation
- Iraq – Ministry of Transport and Communications - General Company for Iraqi Ports, Basrah
- Ireland – Irish Marine Survey Administration
- Italy – Italian Hydrographic Institute
- Jamaica – Jamaican Surveys and Mapping Division
- Japan – Japanese Hydrographic and Oceanographic Department
- Kenya – Survey of Kenya
- Kiribati – Republic of Kiribati
- Kuwait – Kuwait Ministry of Communications
- Latvia – Maritime Administration of Latvia, Hydrographic Service
- Lebanon – Lebanese Navy Hydrographic Service
- Lithuania – Lithuanian Transport Safety Administration
- Malaysia – Malaysian National Hydrographic Centre
- Malta – Transport Malta, Ministry for Transport and Infrastructure
- Mauritius -Mauritian Ministry of Housing and Lands
- Mexico – General Directorate of Oceanography, Hydrography and Meteorology of the Mexican Navy
- Monaco – Monaco Directorate of Naval Affairs
- Montenegro – Institute of Hydrometeorology and Seismology of Montenegro
- Morocco – Hydrography, Oceanography and Cartography Division of the Royal Moroccan Navy
- Mozambique – Mozambican National Institute of Hydrography and Navigation
- Myanmar – Myanmar Naval Hydrographic Centre
- Netherlands – Dutch Hydrographic Service
- New Zealand – Land Information New Zealand
- Nigeria – Nigerian Navy Hydrographic Office
- Norway – Norwegian Hydrographic Office
- Oman – National Hydrographic Office of the Royal Navy of Oman
- Pakistan – Hydrographic Department of the Pakistani Navy
- Panama – Panama Maritime Authority
- Papua New Guinea – National Maritime Safety Authority of Papua New Guinea
- Peru – Peruvian Directorate of Hydrography and Navigation
- Philippines – Philippine National Mapping and Resource Information Authority
- Poland – Hydrographic Office of the Polish Navy
- Portugal – Portuguese Hydrographic Institute
- Qatar – Qatari Ministry of Municipality and Urban Planning
- Romania – Romanian Maritime Hydrographic Directorate
- Russia – Russian Hydrographic Service
- Samoa – Ministry of Works, Transport and Infrastructure
- Saudi Arabia – Saudi Arabian General Commission for Survey
- Seychelles – Seychelles Maritime Safety Authority
- Singapore – Hydrographic Department, Maritime and Port Authority of Singapore
- Slovenia – Slovenian Ministry of Infrastructure
- Solomon Islands – Solomon Islands Maritime Safety Administration
- South Africa – South African Hydrographic Office
- South Korea – Korea Hydrographic and Oceanographic Agency
- Spain – Hydrographic Institute of the Royal Spanish Navy
- Sri Lanka – Sri Lankan National Hydrographic Office
- Suriname – Maritime Authority Suriname
- Sweden - Swedish Maritime Administration
- Thailand – Hydrographic Department of the Royal Thai Navy
- Tonga – Tongan Ministry of Infrastructure
- Trinidad and Tobago – Hydrographic Unit, Ministry of Agriculture & Marine Resources, Lands and Surveys Division
- Tunisia – Hydrographic and Oceanographic Centre of the Tunisian Navy
- Turkey – Turkish Office of Navigation, Hydrography and Oceanography
- Ukraine – State Hydrographic Service of Ukraine
- United Arab Emirates – Ministry of Communications, National Port Authority of the United Arab Emirates
- United Kingdom – United Kingdom Hydrographic Office
- United States – Office of Coast Survey; National Ocean Service; National Geospatial-Intelligence Agency
- Uruguay – Oceanographic, Hydrographic and Meteorological Service of the Uruguayan Navy
- Vanuatu – Ministry of Lands, Geology, and Minerals
- Venezuela – General Command of the Venezuelan Navy, Directorate of Hydrography and Navigation
- Vietnam – Naval Command of Vietnam

=== Suspended ===
- Serbia – Serbian Directorate for Inland Waterways - suspended since 1 January 2013
- Syria – Syrian General Directorate of Ports - suspended since 1 June 2018
