= Argo Navigation =

Marine navigation and boating application

- Company type: Private
- Industry: Navigation software
- Founded: Belcamp, Maryland, (2018)
- Founder: Jeff Foulk
- Website: www.argonav.io

Argo Navigation (commonly known as Argo) is a marine navigation and boating application designed for recreational boaters. The app provides nautical charts, route planning, environmental data, and community-based information to assist users navigating waterways.

== History ==
Argo Navigation was founded in 2018 by Jeff Foulk, a Maryland-based boater, who developed the app to address challenges recreational boaters face when planning routes and discovering destinations on the water.

Early development of the application was influenced by Foulk's research into crowdsourced bathymetry, which involved collecting depth and navigation data from multiple vessels using NMEA-compatible chart plotters. These experiments were conducted across waterways including the Chesapeake Bay, Baltimore Harbor, and portions of the Intracoastal Waterway (ICW). While follow-up research funding from the National Oceanic and Atmospheric Administration (NOAA) did not proceed, the work informed Argo's approach to incorporating community-sourced navigational data.

In January 2023, Argo experienced a surge in public visibility after a TikTok video posted by Foulk's daughter went viral. The video led to a significant increase in downloads and briefly placed the app among the most downloaded navigation applications in the App Store (Apple).

== Features ==
Argo Navigation provides navigation, trip-planning, and community-oriented features for recreational boaters. Core navigation features include:

- Autorouting, which generates suggested routes based on vessel dimensions, destination, and chart data
- Customizable nautical charts, including depth shading and contour displays
- Integrated environmental data, such as weather, wind, current, and wave forecasts
- Hazard reporting and points of interest, contributed by users

A central aspect of the app is its use of crowdsourcing, allowing boaters to share real-time information such as navigational hazards, anchorage recommendations, and local knowledge. This aggregated data is used to improve situational awareness for other users navigating the same waterways.

Argo also incorporates social networking features, enabling users to connect with other boaters, share locations, form groups, and document trips through a digital “Captain’s Log.” These features are intended to foster a sense of community among recreational boaters while encouraging information sharing on the water.
