= International Hydrographic Organization =

Intergovernmental organization

- Organisation Hydrographique Internationale
- Abbreviation: IHO
- Founded: 21 June 1921; 105 years ago
- Location: Monaco
- Members: 104 member states, but 2 suspended (see list)
- Official languages: English, French
- Secretary-General: Luigi Sinapi (Italy)
- Website: www.iho.int

The International Hydrographic Organization (IHO; French: Organisation Hydrographique Internationale) is an intergovernmental organization representing hydrography. As of August 2025, the IHO comprised 104 member states.

A principal aim of the IHO is to ensure that the world's seas, oceans and navigable waters are properly surveyed and charted. It does this through the setting of international standards and through its capacity building programs and offices.

The IHO enjoys observer status at the United Nations, where it is the recognized competent authority on hydrographic surveying and nautical charting. When referring to hydrography and nautical charting in conventions and similar instruments, it is the IHO standards and specifications that are normally used.

== History ==
During the 19th century, many maritime nations established hydrographic offices to provide means for improving the navigation of naval and merchant vessels by providing nautical publications, nautical charts, and other navigational services. There were substantial differences in hydrographic procedures charts, and publications. In 1889, an International Maritime Conference was held at Washington, D.C., and it was proposed to establish a "permanent international commission." Similar proposals were made at the sessions of the International Congress of Navigation held at Saint Petersburg in 1908 and the International Maritime Conference held at Saint Petersburg in 1912.

In 1919, the national Hydrographers of Great Britain and France cooperated in taking the necessary steps to convene an international conference of Hydrographers. London was selected as the most suitable place for this conference, and on 24 July 1919, the First International Conference opened, attended by the Hydrographers of 24 nations. The object of the conference was "To consider the advisability of all maritime nations adopting similar methods in preparation, construction, and production of their charts and all hydrographic publications; of rendering the results in the most convenient form to enable them to be readily used; of instituting a prompt system of mutual exchange of hydrographic information between all countries; and of providing an opportunity to consultations and discussions to be carried out on hydrographic subjects generally by the hydrographic experts of the world." This is still the major purpose of the IHO.

As a result of the 1919 Conference, a permanent organization was formed and statutes for its operations were prepared. The IHB, now the IHO, began its activities in 1921 with 18 nations as members. The Principality of Monaco was selected as the seat of the Organization as a result of the offer of Albert I of Monaco to provide suitable accommodation for the Bureau in the Principality.

The International Hydrographic Organization (IHO) was established in June 1921 as the International Hydrographic Bureau (IHB), with Vice Admiral Sir John Parry, KCB of the United Kingdom serving as its first President. In 1970, under the leadership of Guy Chatel of France, the organization adopted its current name as part of a new International Convention on the IHO, which was agreed upon by its member nations. The term "International Hydrographic Bureau" continued to describe the IHO's secretariat until 8 November 2016, when a major revision to the Convention took effect. Following this change, the secretariat was renamed the "IHO Secretariat," which consists of an elected Secretary-General, two supporting Directors, and a small permanent staff (18 in 2020) at the Organization's headquarters in Monaco.

== Structure ==
Until 2016 the IHO was administered by a secretariat headed by a Directing Committee comprising a President and two Directors. Since 8 November 2016, upon the entry in to force of revisions to the Convention on the IHO, the secretariat is headed by a Secretary-General, supported by two Directors, with Australia's Robert Ward serving as the first Secretary-General. As before, all three senior members of the secretariat continue to be elected to their positions by the Member States at the regular Assembly of the IHO (formerly, IHO Conferences). The secretariat staff comprise a number of technical specialists, administrators, and support personnel. The bulk of the IHO's technical and specialist expertise comes from Member States' personnel, often assisted by invited industry experts, who all provide technical contributions through participation in various IHO committees and working groups. A Council, comprising a sub-set of all the IHO Member States, meets annually and oversees the work of the IHO. A full description, together with details of the workings of all the organs of the IHO is available on the IHO website.

== Functions ==
=== Standardization ===
Since 1968, the IHO has regularly published updated editions of the Standards of Hydrographic Surveys, with the most recent being published in 2008. Each of these publications was designed to incorporate technological advancements and international shipping demands. This is especially true with regards to the rise of electronic navigation equipment in the 1980s.

The IHO also works to standardize the specifications, style, and symbols used in producing nautical charts. In 1971, the IHO was able to get its member states to use one single chart series, also known as INT charts. According to this IHO agreement, if one member state wants to publish a chart for an area covered by another member's existing chart, the duplicate must be created using the same data as the original chart. IHO Publication M-4, which was published in 1984, set specific international standards for nautical charts.

The advent of the Electronic Chart Display and Information System (ECDIS) made it clear to the IHO it also needed to standardize how electronic navigational data is transferred and displayed on ships. Electronic chart data was standardized and categorized in an international database referred to as Electronic Navigational Charts (ENCs). The way this data is transferred from publishers to users was also standardized, as was the display and capabilities of the ECDIS.

=== International Cooperation ===
The IHO has encouraged the formation of Regional Hydrographic Commissions (RHCs). Each RHC coordinates the national surveying and charting activities of countries within each region and acts as a forum to address other matters of common hydrographic interest. The 15 RHCs plus the IHO Hydrographic Commission on Antarctica effectively cover the world. The IHO, in partnership with the Intergovernmental Oceanographic Commission, directs the General Bathymetric Chart of the Oceans program.

=== Training ===
The IHO ensures the safety of maritime navigation by developing hydrographic survey capability and nautical charting standards. To develop and standardize its member states' hydrographic survey capabilities, the IHO worked with the International Federation of Surveyors (Fédération Internationale des Géomètres) and the International Cartographic Association (ICA) to create the IHO's Standards of Competence. These standards are used to educate and train member states' respective hydrographic offices and nautical chart makers. Additionally, the IHO also creates syllabi higher education institutions who teach hydrography and nautical navigation. The IHO also has an advisory board which is tasked with supervising and approving member states' education and training programs.

=== Achievements ===
1. Standardization and near-global adoption of hydrographic terminology, marine cartographic products, and geographical information systems for navigation
2. Increased rate of exploration and mapping of unsurveyed areas of the world's oceans and coastal seabed
3. Standardized and rapid dissemination of navigation information related to safety at sea
4. Standards and accreditation for the training of hydrographers and nautical cartographers

== Publications ==
Most IHO publications, including the standards, guidelines and associated documents such as the International Hydrographic Review, International Hydrographic Bulletin, the Hydrographic Dictionary and the Year Book are available to the general public free of charge from the IHO website. The IHO publishes the international standards related to charting and hydrography, including S-57, IHO Transfer Standard for Digital Hydrographic Data, the encoding standard that is used primarily for electronic navigational charts.

In 2010, the IHO introduced a new, contemporary hydrographic geospatial standard for modelling marine data and information, known as S-100. S-100 and any dependent product specifications are underpinned by an on-line registry accessible via the IHO website. S-100 is aligned with the ISO 19100 series of geographic standards, thereby making it fully compatible with contemporary geospatial data standards.

Because S-100 is based on ISO 19100, it can be used by other data providers for their maritime-related (non-hydrographic) data and information. Various data and information providers from both the government and private sector are now using S-100 as part of the implementation of the e-Navigation concept that has been endorsed by the UN International Maritime Organization (IMO).

Another in the series of publications of interest is S-23, Limits of Oceans and Seas. The 3rd edition dates back to 1953 while the potential 4th edition, started in 1986, has remained a draft since 2002. It was distributed to IHO members, but its official publication has been suspended pending agreement between South Korea and Japan regarding the international standard name of the sea called "Japan Sea" in the 1953 edition.

== See also ==
- World Hydrography Day
