= Glossary of nautical terms (M–Z) =

This glossary of nautical terms is an alphabetical listing of terms and expressions connected with ships, shipping, seamanship and navigation on water (mostly though not necessarily on the sea). Some remain current, while many date from the 17th to 19th centuries. The word nautical derives from the Latin nauticus, from Greek nautikos, from nautēs: "sailor", from naus: "ship".

Further information on nautical terminology may also be found at Nautical metaphors in English, and additional military terms are listed in the Multiservice tactical brevity code article. Terms used in other fields associated with bodies of water can be found at Glossary of fishery terms, Glossary of underwater diving terminology, Glossary of rowing terms, and Glossary of meteorology.

Contents: Top	A	B	C	D	E	F	G	H	I	J	K	L	M	N	O	P	Q	R	S	T	U	V	W	X	Y	Z	See also	References

== M ==
mack
A structure which combines the radar mast and the exhaust stack of a surface ship, thereby saving valuable deck space.
Mae West
A Second World War personal flotation device used to keep people afloat in the water; named after the 1930s actress Mae West, well known for her large bosom.
magazine

The ammunition storage area aboard a warship.
magnetic bearing
An absolute bearing using magnetic north.
magnetic north
The direction towards the North Magnetic Pole. Varies slowly over time.
maiden voyage
The first voyage of a ship in its intended role, i.e. excluding trial trips.
Maierform bow
A V-shaped bow introduced in the late 1920s which allowed a ship to maintain a given speed with less power, improved seakeeping, increased reserve buoyancy, reduced pitching movements, and improved propeller immersion to increase performance in rough seas.
main
The high sea; the open ocean.
main deck
The uppermost continuous deck extending from bow to stern.
mainbrace
Either of the braces attached to the yard of the mainsail (the largest and lowest sail on the mainmast) on a square-rigged vessel.
mainmast

1. The tallest mast on a ship with more than one mast, especially the tallest mast on a full-rigged ship.
2. On a ship with more than one mast, the second mast from the bow.
mainmast head
The top of a sailing vessel's mainmast.
mainmastman
A sailor assigned to the mainmast.
mains
The main brails on the mainsail.
mainsheet
A sail control line that allows the most obvious effect on mainsail trim. Primarily used to control the angle of the boom, and thereby the mainsail, this control can also increase or decrease downward tension on the boom while sailing upwind, significantly affecting sail shape. For more control over downward tension on the boom, a boom vang may be used.
mainstay
The stay running from the top of the mainmast to the bottom of the foremast, or from the top of the foremast to the ship's stem.
making way
When a vessel is moving under its own power.
man-of-war

A warship from the Age of Sail.
man overboard
1. An emergency call that alerts the crew that someone aboard has gone overboard into the water and must be rescued.
2. A person who has fallen into the water from a ship or boat – the object of the resulting rescue attempt.
man the rails
To station the crew of a naval vessel along the rails and superstructure of the vessel as a method of saluting or rendering honors.
man the yards
To have all of the crew of a sailing vessel not required on deck to handle the ship go aloft and spread out along the yards. Originally used in harbors to display the whole crew to harbor authorities and other ships present to show that the vessel's guns were not manned and hence her intentions were peaceful, manning the yards has since become a display used in harbor during celebrations and other special events.
manifest
A document listing the cargo, passengers, and crew of a ship for the use of customs and other officials.
Marconi rig
An archaic term for Bermuda rig. The mainsail is triangular, rigged fore-and-aft with its luff fixed to the mast. The foresail (jib) is a staysail hanked onto the forestay. Refers to the similarity of the tall mast to a radio aerial.
marina
A docking facility for small ships and yachts.
marine
1. A soldier trained for service afloat in a (primarily) infantry force that specializes in naval campaigns and subordinated to a navy or a separate naval branch of service rather than to an army. Often capitalized (e.g. a Marine or the Marines). Notable examples are the United Kingdom's Royal Marines, formed as the Duke of York and Albany's Maritime Regiment of Foot in 1664 with many and varied duties including providing guard to ship's officers should there be a mutiny aboard, and the US Marine Corps, formed in 1775 as a separate naval service alongside the US Navy. It is incorrect, and often viewed by marines as offensive, to refer to a marine as a "soldier" or "infantryman", as these terms refer to personnel of an army rather than those of a marine force. It also is incorrect, and sometimes considered offensive by both merchant mariners and marines, to refer to merchant mariners as "merchant marines", because merchant mariners are civilian sailors responsible for operating merchant ships and are not marines. Marines sometimes are thought by seamen to be rather gullible, hence the phrase "tell it to the marines", meaning that one does not believe what is being said.
2. An alternative term for a navy, uncommon in English but common in other languages.
3. Of or pertaining to the sea (e.g. marine biology, marine insurance, marine salvage).
4. A painting representing a subject related to the sea.
marine sandglass (or glass)
An hourglass-like timekeeping instrument used aboard ships from at least the 14th century until reliable mechanical timepieces replaced it in the early 19th century. Marine sandglasses measured the passage of time in 30-minute increments to regulate time on watch, to measure a boat's speed, and to assist in determining a ship's position by measuring the time elapsed while she was on a given course.
mariner
A sailor.
maritime
1. Of or related to the sea (e.g., maritime activities, maritime law, maritime strategy).
2. Bordering on the sea (e.g., maritime provinces, maritime states).
3. Living in or near the sea (e.g., maritime animals).
4. Of or relating to a mariner or sailor.
marlinspike
A tool used in ropework for tasks such as unlaying rope for splicing, untying knots, or forming a makeshift handle.
martnet
A type of brail attached to the leech of square sails (particularly the courses) and of the lateen mizzen; superseded by the leechline c. 1650
mast
A vertical pole on a ship that supports sails or rigging. If a wooden multi-part mast, this term applies specifically to the lowest portion.
mast case
A yachtsman's tabernacle. The iron fitting in which the heel of the mast is mounted.
Mast partner
The reinforced area of the deck surrounding the hole through which a mast passes as it rises from its step (usually on the keel) to the above-deck area
mast step
The place in the hull where the lowest point of a mast rests, taking the weight of the mast and the thrust imposed by the tension of the rigging, and preventing lateral and fore and aft movement of the bottom of the mast. With a wooden hull and mast, this is usually achieved by having a socket cut in the top of the keelson, a floor or some other major structural component. A tenon cut into the bottom of the mast sits snugly in the socket. With a deck-stepped aluminium mast, the step may consist of a metal fitting bolted to the deck, to which bolts a matching fitting at the bottom of the mast.
mast stepping
The process of raising a mast.
masthead
A small platform partway up the mast, just above the height of the mast's main yard. A lookout is stationed here, and men who are working on the main yard will embark from here. See also crow's nest.
masthead light
A white running light displayed at the front of a vessel.
master
1. The captain of a commercial vessel.
2. A senior officer of a naval sailing ship in charge of routine seamanship and navigation but not in command during combat.
3. (master) A former naval rank.
master-at-arms
A non-commissioned officer responsible for discipline on a naval ship.
mate
1. In a merchant vessel, a watch-keeping deck officer subordinate to the master. Often qualified with the seniority of the mates: first mate, second mate, etc.
2. Generally, an assistant to a crew member with a specific task, e.g. bo'sun's mate, gunner's mate, sailmaker's mate, etc.
matelot
A traditional Royal Navy term for an ordinary sailor.
material
Military equipages of all descriptions for the naval services. The bombs, blankets, beans, and bulletins of the Navy and Marine Corps. Taken from Nelson's British navy as the US services became professional. See also materiel – military supplies, equipment and weapons.
Mediterranean mooring

A method of mooring stern-to.
merchant marine
A collective term for all merchant ships registered in a given country and the civilians (especially those of that nationality) who man them; the ships and personnel in combination are said to constitute that country's merchant marine. Called the merchant navy in the United Kingdom and some other countries.
merchant mariner
A civilian officer or sailor who serves in the merchant marine. Sometimes such personnel are incorrectly called "merchant marines", but both merchant mariners and marines frown on this term; although merchant mariners are part of the merchant marine, they are civilians and are not in any way marines, which are a specialized type of military personnel.
merchant navy
A name bestowed upon the merchant marine of the United Kingdom by King George V, and since adopted by some other countries as well. The merchant navy's personnel are civilians, and the term "merchant navy" does not imply that they or their ships are a part of the navy. Synonymous with the term merchant marine.
merchantman
A merchant ship - any non-naval passenger- or cargo-carrying vessel, including cargo ships, tankers, and passenger ships but excluding troopships.
mess

1. An eating place aboard a ship.
2. A group of crew who live and eat together.
mess deck catering
A system of catering in which a standard ration is issued to a mess supplemented by a money allowance, which the mess may use to buy additional victuals from the purser's stores or elsewhere. Each mess was autonomous and self-regulating. Seaman cooks, often members of the mess, prepared the meals and took them, in a tin canteen, to the galley to be cooked by the ship's cooks. As distinct from "cafeteria messing" where food is issued to an individual hand, which is now the general practice.
metacenter
The midway point between a vessel's center of buoyancy when upright and her center of buoyancy when tilted.
metacentric height (GM)
A measurement of the initial static stability of a vessel afloat, calculated as the distance between her center of gravity and her metacenter. A vessel with a large metacentric height rolls more quickly and therefore more uncomfortably for people on board; a vessel with a small metacentric height will roll sluggishly and may face a greater danger of capsizing.
Middle Passage
The portion of the triangular trade pattern of the late 16th through the early 19th centuries in the Atlantic Ocean in which slaves were transported from Africa to the Americas. In the terminology of the slave trade itself, the Middle Passage linked the First Passage (the delivery from Europe of the trade goods to be used to purchase slaves) with the Final Passage (the shipment of the products of slave plantations – sugar, tobacco, cotton – to the markets of Europe).
middles
The middle brails on the mainsail, higher than the lowers, and lower than the mains.
midship house
A superstructure built over the midships section of the hull, often housing the bridge and officers quarters, as well as passenger quarters aboard cargo liners. A common feature of tankers, cargo liners, and cargo ships up until the mid-20th century, when ship design moved away from the use of midship houses.
midshipman
1. During the 17th century, a naval rating for an experienced seaman.
2. From the 18th century, a naval commissioned officer candidate.
3. From the 1790s, an apprentice naval officer.
4. From the 19th century, an officer cadet at a naval academy.
5. In contemporary British usage, a non-commissioned officer below the rank of lieutenant. Usually regarded as being "in training" to some degree. Also known as "Snotty". It is "the lowest form of rank in the Royal Navy" where he has authority over and responsibility for more junior ranks, yet, at the same time, relying on their experience and learning his trade from them.
6. In contemporary American usage, a cadet of either sex at the United States Merchant Marine Academy or the United States Naval Academy, or under contract and having sworn the Oath of Office in the Navy Reserve Officer Training Corps (NROTC) program. When plural (midshipmen), the term refers to the student body of either academy, and more formally as "the Regiment of Midshipmen" for the Merchant Marine Academy and "the Brigade of Midshipmen" for the Naval Academy, or for the NROTC unit members usually organized into battalions.
midshipman's hitch
An alternative to the Blackwall hitch, preferred if the rope is greasy. Made by first forming a Blackwall hitch and then taking the underneath part and placing it over the bill of the hook.
midshipman's nuts
Broken pieces of biscuit as dessert.
midshipman's roll
A slovenly method of rolling up a hammock transversely and lashing it endways by one clue.
midships

A shortened form of amidships, with both alternative meanings.
mile
See nautical mile.
military mast
A hollow, tubular mast used in warships in the last third of the 19th century, often equipped with a fighting top armed with light-caliber guns.
millers
Shipboard rats
mine
A self-contained explosive device intended to damage or sink surface ships or submarines, designed to be placed in water and left to wait until they are triggered by the approach of, proximity of, or contact with a surface ship or submarines.
minehunter
A vessel designed or equipped to detect and destroy individual mines. It differs from a minesweeper, which is designed or equipped to clear areas of water of mines without necessarily detecting them first.
minelayer
A vessel designed or equipped to deploy (or "lay") mines.
minesweeper
A vessel designed or equipped to clear areas of water of mines without necessarily detecting them first. It differs from a minehunter, which is designed or equipped to detect and destroy individual mines.
misstay
To be "in irons" (i.e. to lose forward momentum) when changing tack.
mistico
A large coastal sailing vessel used in the Mediterranean in the 18th and 19th centuries. Misticos were decked vessels with long, low hulls and two masts amidships that carried two lateen sails or settee sails and a jib.
mizzen
1. The mizzenmast is (a) on a vessel with three masts, the after-most mast, (b) on a vessel with two masts, the after-most mast if it is shorter than the other mast, (c) on a vessel with four masts, the third mast, counting from forward (d) in the special situation of British luggers with two masts, the after-most mast.
2. The mizzen sail is the lowest sail set on the mizzen mast. This is normally a fore-and-aft sail. Where a lower square sail is set on the mizzen, it is called a cro'jack to differentiate from a sail such as a spanker
3. A mizzen staysail is a fore-and-aft sail set in front of the mizzen mast
mole
A massive structure, usually of stone or concrete, used as a pier, breakwater, or causeway between places separated by water. May have a wooden structure built upon it and resemble a wooden pier or wharf, but a mole differs from a pier, quay, or wharf in that water cannot flow freely underneath it.
molgogger
1. A type of roller fairlead, also known as a cage roller, with vertical and horizontal rollers, mounted on the bulwark or gunwale and used to constrain and guide a fishing net or towing cable for a net or minesweeping paravane.
2. A removable or folding vertical bar or hook fitted to the bulwarks of a tug on either side to prevent the towline moving too far forward, which can endanger stability. Sometimes fitted with a roller. Also called a Norman pin.
monitor
1. A turreted ironclad warship of the second half of the 19th century characterized by low freeboard, shallow draft, poor seaworthiness, and heavy guns, intended for riverine and coastal operations.
2. In occasional 19th-century usage, any turreted warship.
3. A shallow-draft armored shore bombardment vessel of the first half of the 20th century, designed to provide fire support to ground troops, often mounting heavy guns.
4. (breastwork monitor) A 19th-century monitor designed with a breastwork to improve seaworthiness.
5. (river monitor) A monitor specifically designed for riverine operations, used during the 19th and 20th centuries and more recently than other types of monitor. River monitors generally are smaller and lighter than other monitors.
monkey bridge
A high platform above the wheelhouse offering better visibility to the operator while maneuvering.
monkey's fist
A ball woven out of line used to provide heft to heave the line to another location. The monkey fist and other heaving-line knots were sometimes weighted with lead (easily available in the form of foil used e.g. to seal tea chests from dampness) although Clifford W. Ashley notes that there was a "definite sporting limit" to the weight thus added.
moor
1. To attach a boat to a mooring buoy or post.
2. To dock a ship.
3. To secure a vessel with a cable or anchor.
mooring

A place to moor a vessel.
mother ship

A vessel that leads, serves, or carries smaller vessels, in the latter case either releasing them and then proceeding independently or also recovering them after they have completed a mission or operation. A mother ship sometimes contrasts with a tender, which often (but not necessarily) is a vessel that supports or cares for larger vessels.
motorsailer
A type of motor-powered sailing vessel, typically a yacht, that can derive power from its sails or engine, independently of each other and often with both at the same time (motorsailing)
motorsailing
Proceeding under the power of sails and engines at the same time. In a yacht this is usually to windward and may be found more comfortable than using just sails or engines on their own.
motor ship

A ship propelled by an internal combustion engine, usually a diesel engine.
mould
A template of the shape of the hull in transverse section. Several moulds are used to form a temporary framework around which a hull is built.
moulded
(of a timber in a wooden hull) The identifier of a measurement of a timber in a wooden hull, used, together with sided, instead of width and thickness which could be ambiguous – length, the third dimension is not ambiguous. Moulded identifies the measure across the surface of an individual timber where one side of that surface is shaped to fit the overall hull shape, as determined by the moulds. Therefore this is the dimension across the vertical sides of a keel, the athwartships face of a frame, or the fore and aft face of stem or stern post.
moulded beam
moulded breadth
The breadth of the hull lines at the widest point, normally at midships and measured inside the hull planking or plating. Used in some systems of tonnage measurement.
moulded depth
The distance between the horizontal plane of the top of the keel and the top of the main deck beams at the edge of the hull. Compare with freeboard depth.
moulded dimensions
Dimensions of a ship shown by the lines plan, generally excluding planking thickness and shell thickness.
moulded draft
moulded draught
Draught measured relative to the base line. Compare with keel draught.
mould loft
Where the lines of the ship are drawn out full-size and the templates for the timbers are made.
mousing
Several turns of light line around the mouth of a hook, to prevent unhooking accidents.
mulie
A barge rigged with a spritsail main, and a large gaff rigged mizzen afore the steering wheel. It is sheeted to the saddle chock.
multipurpose vessel
A cargo ship that has fittings to carry standard shipping containers and retractable tweendecks that can be moved out of the way so that the ship can carry bulk cargo.
multiservice tactical brevity code
Codes used by various military forces to convey complex information in a few words.
muster drill
An exercise conducted by the crew of a ship prior to embarking on a voyage. Passengers are required to participate in the drill so that they can be instructed how to evacuate safely in the event of an emergency on board the ship.
muster station
A specific location on a vessel planned as a gathering place during an emergency or a muster drill. If a person is believed missing, all passengers must report to their muster station for a head count.
muzzle
Iron ban around the mast to hold the heel of the sprit.
M.S. (or MS)
An abbreviation for motor ship, used before a ship's name.
M.V. (or MV)
An abbreviation for motor vessel, used before a ship's name.
M.Y. (or MY)
An abbreviation for motor yacht, used before a yacht's name.

Contents: Top	A	B	C	D	E	F	G	H	I	J	K	L	M	N	O	P	Q	R	S	T	U	V	W	X	Y	Z	See also	References

== N ==
name ship
A ship whose name also is used to refer to her entire class of ships. Usually but not always the first ship of her class to be completed and enter service, in which case the term name ship can be used as a synonym for lead ship.
natural harbour
A body of water protected from the weather by virtue of its being mostly surrounded by land, and deep enough to provide anchorage for the vessels using it.
narrowboat
A type of boat designed specifically to fit the narrow canal locks of the United Kingdom.
narrows
A narrow part of a navigable waterway.
nautical
Of or pertaining to sailors, seamanship, or navigation; maritime.
nautical chart
A map of a sea or ocean area and adjacent coastal regions, intended specifically for navigation at sea. Nautical charts use map projections designed for easy use with hand instruments, such as the Mercator projection, and indicate depths, hazards, landmarks, aids to navigation such as buoys, and ashore facilities of interest to mariners. Nautical charts are generally originally published by government agencies such as the U.S. National Oceanic and Atmospheric Administration, and are now provided in both print form and digital for use in chartplotters.
nautical mile
A unit of length corresponding to approximately one minute of arc of latitude along any meridian arc. By international agreement, it is equivalent to exactly 1,852 metres (6,076 ft; 1.151 miles).
nautical style
An iconic and enduring style of dress that has its roots in the traditional naval uniforms of Britain and France, but has since transitioned into civilian maritime attire, leisurewear, and a globally recognisable fashion genre.
naval infantry
1. Sailors subordinated to a navy trained and equipped to operate ashore temporarily as an organized infantry force, but at other times responsible for the normal duties of sailors aboard ship.
2. A specialized, permanent force of troops subordinated to a navy and responsible for infantry operations ashore. Although more specialized than sailors trained to operate temporarily as naval infantry and bearing similarities to a marine force or marine corps, such permanent naval infantry forces often lack the full capabilities of a marine force. Naval infantry forces also usually differ from marine forces in being subordinated directly to a navy rather than to a separate branch of naval service such as a marine corps.
naval programme
The British system of authorizing naval construction by an annual bill in Parliament.
navigation
All activities related to determining, plotting, and tracking the position and course of a ship in order to keep track of its position relative to land while at sea. Navigation charts have been used since ancient times, and remain in use as back-ups to modern satellite-based positioning systems. Numerous map projections including the common Mercator projection were developed specifically to make navigation at sea simple to perform with straight-edges and compasses.
navigation light

A source of illumination on a vessel intended to give information to other vessels on her position, heading, of status.
navigation rules
Rules of the road that provide guidance on how to avoid collision and also used to assign blame when a collision does occur.
nay
A reply in the negative, synonymous with "no". The opposite of "aye".
net cutter
1. (Fisheries patrol), also trawlwire cutter: A device employed by the Icelandic Coast Guard during the "Cod Wars" to cut the trawling wires of foreign fishing trawlers working within Iceland's claimed exclusive fisheries zones.
2. (Submarine): A device, sometimes powered by explosives, mounted on the bow of a submarine to cut through anti-submarine netting.
3. (Torpedo): A scissors-like or pistol-powered device on the nose of a torpedo intended to assist the torpedo in breaking through torpedo nets.
net laying ship

A type of naval auxiliary ship equipped for and primarily tasked with laying torpedo nets or anti-submarine nets to protect individual ships at anchor, harbors, or other anchorages from torpedo attack and intrusions by submarines.
net tender
An alternative term for a net laying ship.
New Company ship
A term used for a ship trading between England and ports east of the Cape of Good Hope for the English Company Trading to the East Indies, a new company chartered in 1697 to compete with the "old" East India Company. The term fell into disuse when the two companies merged in 1707.
night boat
(United States) A type of steamboat that provided sleeping quarters for passengers on overnight voyages, as opposed to a day boat that had no need of such facilities.
nipper
A short rope used to bind a cable to the "messenger" (a moving line propelled by the capstan) so that the cable is dragged along, too (used where the cable is too large to be wrapped around the capstan itself). During the raising of an anchor, the nippers were attached and detached from the (endless) messenger by the ship's boys. Hence the term for small boys: "nippers".
nock
The throat of the mainsail.
non-self-sustaining
See self-sustaining.
nun
A type of navigational buoy, often cone-shaped, but if not, always triangular in silhouette, colored green in IALA region A or red in IALA region B (the Americas, Japan, Korea, and the Philippines). In channel marking its use is opposite that of a "can buoy".

Contents: Top	A	B	C	D	E	F	G	H	I	J	K	L	M	N	O	P	Q	R	S	T	U	V	W	X	Y	Z	See also	References

== O ==
oakum
Any material, often tarred hemp fibres picked from old untwisted ropes, used for caulking gaps or seams between the planks of hulls.
oar
A pole, usually of wood, with a blade at one end and a handle at the other, which is pivoted on a fulcrum on the side of a boat to provide propulsion by pushing the blade through the water.
oar crutch
A metal (or sometimes plastic) fitting that acts as the fulcrum point of an oar. It usually takes the form of a U-shape, with a pin underneath the bottom of the "U". The pin rotates in a socket in the boat's gunwale, and the oar rests in the "U". See also rowlock.
ocean liner
See liner.
officer's country
The part of a naval vessel containing the residential quarters and wardroom for commissioned officers. Officer's country is off-limits to enlisted personnel unless they are there on official business.
offing
The more distant part of the sea as seen from the shore, generally implying the open ocean beyond anchoring ground.
offshore
1. Moving away from the shore.
2. (of a wind) Blowing from the land to the sea.
3. At some distance from the shore; located in the sea away from the coast.
oiler
1. (ship) A naval auxiliary ship with fuel tanks which refuels other ships.
1. (occupation) The job title of a seaman holding a junior position in a ship's engineering crew, senior only to the engine room wiper.
oilskins

Foul-weather clothing worn by sailors.
old man
Crew's slang for the captain, master, or commanding officer of a vessel.
old salt
Slang for an experienced mariner.
on board

See aboard.
on her own bottom

Said of a vessel making a voyage without being carried aboard another vessel; e.g. "the yacht crossed the ocean on her own bottom", or in the plural, "yachts rarely cross the ocean on their own bottoms".
on station
A ship's destination, typically an area to be patrolled or guarded.
on the beach
1. A Royal Navy term that means "retired from the Service."
2. On shore leave.
on the hard
A boat that has been hauled and is now sitting on dry land.
open registry
An organization that will register merchant ships owned by foreign entities, generally to provide a flag of convenience.
ordinary
See in ordinary.
ordinary seaman
1. A seaman in the British Royal Navy in the 18th century who had between one and two years of experience at sea. Later, a formal rank in the Royal Navy for the lowest grade of seaman, now obsolete.
2. The second-lowest rank in the United States Navy from 1797 to 1917, between landsman and seaman. Renamed "seaman second class" in 1917.
3. The rating for entry-level personnel in the deck department of a ship in the United States Merchant Marine. An ordinary seaman (abbreviated "OS") is considered to be serving an apprenticeship to become an able seaman.
ore carrier
A type of bulk carrier specially designed to carry ore.
oreboat

A Great Lakes term for a vessel primarily used in the transport of iron ore.
orlop deck
1. The lowest deck of a ship-of-the-line.
2. The deck covering in the hold.
oscar
1. International signal for a man overboard.
2. Nickname for a water rescue training dummy. See also paradummy.
outboard
1. Situated outside the hull of a vessel.
2. Situated within a vessel but positioned away (or farther away, when contrasted with another item) from her centerline.
3. Farther from the hull of a ship; e.g. "the larger boat was tied up alongside the ship outboard of the smaller boat".
4. Farther from the pier or shore; e.g. "the tanker and cargo ship were tied up at the pier alongside one another with the tanker outboard of the cargo ship".
5. An outboard motor.
6. A vessel fitted with an outboard motor.
outboard motor
A motor mounted externally on the transom of a small boat. Outboard motors are often mounted in a way that makes them easily movable, such that the boat may be steered by rotating the whole motor with respect to the boat's bearing, instead of or in addition to using a rudder.
outdrive
The lower part of a sterndrive.
outhaul
A line used to control the shape of a sail.
outrigger
1. Generally, any structure projecting from the side of a vessel.
2. Any contraposing float rigging beyond the side of a vessel to improve the vessel's stability.
3. A thin, long, solid hull used to stabilize the inherently unstable main hull of an outrigger canoe or a sailboat.
4. A variety of structures projecting from a keelboat by which the running rigging may be attached outboard of the hull.
5. A pole or series of poles projecting from a fishing vessel that allow the vessel to trawl with more fishing lines in the water without the lines tangling and allowing lures and bait to simulate a school of fish.
6. A triangular frame on a rowboat or galley that holds the rowlock away from the saxboard or gunwale to optimize leverage for the rowers. Also called a rigger.
outward bound
To leave the safety of port, heading for the open ocean.
over-canvassed
To have too great a sail area up to safely maneuver in the current wind conditions.
over-reaching
Holding a course too long while tacking.
over the barrel
Adult sailors were flogged on the back or shoulders while tied to a grating, but boys were beaten instead on the posterior (often bared), with a cane or cat o' nine tails, while bending, often tied down, over the barrel of a gun, known as kissing the gunner's daughter.
overbear
To sail downwind directly at another ship, stealing the wind from its sails.
overboard
Off or outside a vessel. If something or someone falls, jumps, or is thrown off of a vessel into the water, the object or person is said to have gone overboard. See man overboard.
overfalls
Dangerously steep and breaking seas due to opposing currents and wind in a shallow area, or strong currents over a shallow rocky bottom.
overhead
The ceiling of any enclosed space below decks in a vessel, essentially the bottom of the deck above.
overhaul
Hauling the buntline ropes over the sails to prevent them from chafing.
overtaking sea
Seas approaching a vessel from between 15° to port or starboard of astern at a speed greater than that of the vessel.
overwhelmed
Capsized or foundered.
owner
Traditional Royal Navy term for the captain, a survival from the days when privately owned ships were often hired for naval service.
ox-eye
A cloud or other weather phenomenon that may be indicative of an upcoming storm.

Contents: Top	A	B	C	D	E	F	G	H	I	J	K	L	M	N	O	P	Q	R	S	T	U	V	W	X	Y	Z	See also	References

== P ==
package freighter
A cargo ship that carries packaged cargo in less than railroad car-sized lots, with shipping charges billed by the piece.
packet

1. Originally, a vessel employed to carry post office mail packets to and from British embassies, colonies, and outposts.
2. Later, any regularly scheduled ship carrying cargo or passengers, as in packet trade.
packet trade
Any regularly scheduled cargo, passenger, or mail trade conducted by ship.
packetman
A seaman aboard a ship engaged in packet trade.
paddle box
A covering, usually made of wood, for the upper part of a paddle wheel on a paddle steamer.
paddle guards
See guards.
paddy wester
Traditional Royal Navy term for a young or inexperienced seaman.
pagoda mast
A large and distinctive type of foremast installed aboard Imperial Japanese Navy battleships and battlecruisers during modernization and reconstruction of the ships in the 1930s. A pagoda mast was created by strengthening a ship's existing tripod foremast and adding platforms to it for searchlights, lookouts, shelters, and other structures, giving the mast the appearance of a pagoda temple.
painter
A rope attached to the bow of a vessel, used to make the vessel fast to a dock or a larger vessel, including when towed astern.
palace steamer
A term sometimes used to describe the largest and finest class of American passenger steamboats.
palm
A protective device, usually leather, worn on the hand when working with a sail needle to repair sails.
panting
The pulsation in and out of the bow and stern plating as the ship alternately rises and plunges deep into the water.
paravane
1. (weapon) A device stabilized by vanes that functions as an underwater glider and is usually streamed from the bow of a vessel and towed alongside, intended to cut the mooring of submerged mines or otherwise destroy them.
2. (water kite) A towed underwater object with hydrofoils, of use in commercial and sport fishing, water sports, marine exploration, and military operations, sometimes equipped with sensors and also of use in exerting a sideward holding force on a vessel. Also called a water kite.
parbuckle
A method of lifting a roughly cylindrical object such as a spar. One end of a rope is made fast above the object, a loop of rope is lowered and passed around the object, which can be raised by hauling on the free end of rope.
parley
A discussion or conference, especially between enemies, over terms of a truce or other matters.
parrel
A movable loop or collar, used to fasten a yard or gaff to its respective mast. A parrel still allows the spar to be raised or lowered and swivel around the mast. It is sometimes made of wire or rope and fitted with beads to reduce friction.
part brass rags
Fall out with a friend. From the days when cleaning materials were shared between sailors.
passageway
An interior corridor or hallway on a ship.
passenger-cargoman
See cargo liner.
passenger-cargo ship
See cargo liner.
patache

A type of very light and shallow Spanish sailing vessel of the 15th through 18th centuries with two masts, resembling a cross between a brig and a schooner. Originally a type of warship, but later in use as a trading vessel.
pawls
Small bars used to stop the barrel of a winch or capstan moving backward under an increased load or if the turning power was reduced. In early capstans, the pawls had to be manually moved in and out of the notches in which they worked. Later capstans had automatic pawls that dropped into notches as the barrel turned. In breaking out an anchor, a crew would "heave and pawl" if the bow was rising and falling with the waves, so giving a varying load on the cable.
pay off
1. To let a vessel's head fall off from the wind (to leeward).
2. During the Age of Sail, the practice of paying a crew its wages for the voyage when a vessel completed her voyage, at which point the crew was said to be paid off.
3. In British and Commonwealth usage, to decommission a warship, e.g. "The old destroyer paid off after returning to port at the end of her final cruise."
paying
Filling a seam (with caulking or pitch), lubricating the running rigging; paying with slush, protecting from the weather by covering with slush. See also the devil to pay.
paymaster
The officer responsible for all money matters in Royal Navy ships including the paying and provisioning of the crew, all stores, tools, and spare parts. See also purser.
pea coat
Heavy topcoat originally made from pilot cloth. Officers and chief petty officers wear a variation with gold buttons called a reefer or a longer model called a bridge coat.
peace cruiser
U.S. Navy term of the early 20th century for obsolete cruisers and gunboats used in policing and diplomatic roles.
peak
1. The upper aftermost corner of a fore-and-aft sail; used in many combinations, such as peak-halyards, peak-brails, etc.
2. The narrow part of a vessel's bow, or the hold within it.
3. The extremity of an anchor fluke; the bill.
peaks
The uppermost brails on the mainsail. Upper and lower peaks are normal, but a barge may carry a third set, too.
pelagic
1. Living in the open ocean rather than coastal or inland waters (e.g. a pelagic shark).
2. Taking place in the open ocean (e.g. pelagic fishing, pelagic sealing).
pelican hook

A hook with a hinge in the curve of the hook, normally held closed by a metal ring that keeps the two hinged parts together. Can be instantly released by knocking the ring along the hook so that it frees one of the hinged parts which swings open and releases whatever the hook is holding. Often seen on opening sections of guard rails and life-raft lashings, but also used on more heavily loaded components.
pendant
1. A length of wire or rope secured at one end to a mast or spar and having a block or other fitting at the lower end.
2. A length of wire or rope hooked to a tackle on leeboards.
3. An alternate spelling of pennant.
pennant
A long, thin triangular flag flown from the masthead of a military ship (as opposed to a burgee, the flags thus flown on yachts).
permeability
The ratio μ of the floodable space to the total space in a ship compartment, used for damage stability calculations.
picaroon
An obsolete (circa 17th century) term for a pirate.
picket boat
A boat on sentry duty, or one placed on a line forward of a position to warn against an enemy advance.
pier
A raised structure, typically supported by widely spread piles or pillars, used industrially for loading and unloading commercial ships, recreationally for walking and housing attractions at a seaside resort, or as a structure for use by boatless fishermen. The lighter structure of a pier contrasts with the more solid foundations of a quay or the closely spaced piles of a wharf. In North America, the term "pier" used alone connotes either a pier used (or formerly used) by commercial shipping or one used for fishing, while in Europe the term used alone connotes a recreational pier at a seaside resort.
pier-head jump
When a sailor is drafted to a warship at the last minute, just before she sails.
pilot
A specially knowledgeable person qualified to navigate a vessel through difficult waters, e.g. harbour pilot, etc.
pilot boat
A type of boat used to transport maritime pilots between land and the inbound or outbound ships that they are piloting.
pilot ladder
A highly specialized form of rope ladder, typically used to embark and disembark pilots over the side of a ship. Sometimes confused with Jacob's ladders, but the design and construction of pilot ladders is governed tightly by international regulation and includes spreaders – elongated versions of the standard machined step – rather than the type of steps generally found on Jacob's ladders.
pilothouse
An alternative term for a ship's bridge or wheelhouse.
PIM
Points (or plan) of intended movement. The charted course for a naval unit's movements.
pinas

A type of two-masted schooner with a large bowsprit, clipper bow, and transom stern built in the Terengganu area on the east coast of the Malay Peninsula.
pinnace
1. (ship's boat) A small, light boat propelled by oars or a sail, used as a tender to larger vessels during the Age of Sail.
2. (full-rigged pinnace) A small "race built" galleon, square-rigged with either two or three masts.
3. In modern usage, any small boat other than a launch or lifeboat associated with a larger vessel.
pintle
The pin or bolt on which a ship's rudder pivots. The pintle rests in the gudgeon.
pipe (bos'n's)

A whistle used by boatswains (bosuns or bos'ns) to issue commands. Consisting of a metal tube that directs the breath over an aperture on the top of a hollow ball to produce high-pitched notes. The pitch of the notes can be changed by partly covering the aperture with the finger of the hand in which the pipe is held. The shape of the instrument is similar to that of a smoking pipe.
pipe down
A signal on the bosun's pipe to signal the end of the day, requiring lights (and smoking pipes) to be extinguished and silence from the crew.
piping the side
A salute on the bosun's pipe(s) performed in the company of the deck watch on the starboard side of the quarterdeck or at the head of the gangway, to welcome or bid farewell to the ship's captain, senior officers, and honoured visitors.
piracy
An act of robbery or criminal violence at sea by the occupants of one vessel against the occupants of another vessel (and therefore excluding such acts committed by the crew or passengers of a vessel against others aboard the same vessel). Piracy is also distinguished from privateering, which is authorized by national authorities and therefore a legitimate form of war-like activity by non-state actors.
pirate
One who engages in an act of piracy.
pitch
A vessel's motion, rotating about the beam/transverse axis, causing the fore and aft ends to rise and fall repetitively.
pitchpole
To capsize a boat stern over bow, rather than by rolling over.
pivotting
To turn a sailing barge in shallow water by dropping the leeboard so it drags in the mud, then putting the helm hard over. The maneuver is often used to enter congested harbours.
plane
To skim over the water at high speed rather than push through it.
Plimsoll line

A special marking, positioned amidships, that indicates the draft of the vessel and the legal limit to which the vessel may be loaded for specific water types and temperatures.
plotting room
See transmitting station.
pocket battleship
British term for the German Navy's Deutschland-class cruisers, which entered service in the 1930s. The ships had battleship-like armament and armor but were of cruiser size and faster than battleships of the time and were intended to serve as commerce raiders. Classified by the German Navy as Panzerschiffe ("armored ships").
point
A unit of bearing equal to the angle made by 1/32 of a circle, i.e. 11.25 degrees. A turn of 32 points is a complete turn through 360 degrees.
point up

To change the direction of a sailboat so that it is more upwind, i.e. to bring the bow windward. This is the opposite of falling off.

Points of sail and approximate apparent wind for a conventional sailboat on starboard tack

points of sail
The course of a sailing vessel in relation to the direction of the wind, divided into six points: in irons (pointed directly into the wind), close hauled (sailing as close into the direction of the wind as possible), close reach (between close hauled and beam reach), beam reach (perpendicular to the wind), broad reach (wind behind the vessel at an angle), and running downwind, running before the wind, or simply running (wind directly behind the vessel).
polacca

A 17th-century sailing vessel commonly seen in the Mediterranean, similar to a xebec with two or three masts; two-masted polaccas were known as brig-polaccas and three-masted polaccas as ship-polaccas or polacca-settees. Polacca-settees had a lateen sail on the foremast, a European-style square rig on the mainmast, and a gaff or lateen on the mizzenmast.
polacca-settee
A three-masted polacca.
polacre
Another name for a polacca.
polacre-xebec
A type of xebec with a square rig on her foremast, lateen sails on her other masts, a bowsprit, and two headsails. A polacre-xebec differed from a felucca in that a felucca had only lateen sails.
pontoon
A flat-bottomed vessel used as a ferry, barge, or car float, or a float moored alongside a jetty or a ship to facilitate boarding.
poop deck
A high deck on the aft superstructure of a ship. The deck forms a roof over the "poop cabin" in the aft of the ship.
pooped
1. (of a ship or boat) to have a wave break over the stern when travelling with a following sea. This contingency, that can cause significant damage to the ship, is also referred to as "pooping".
2. (colloquially) Exhausted.
port
1. (facility): A maritime facility on a sea coast, in an estuary, or on a river with loading areas at which a vessel can bring aboard or discharge cargo or passengers.
2. A place along a coast or riverbank where a vessel can take shelter, often including loading and unloading facilities for vessels.
3. A city or town associated with such a facility or sheltering area.
4. (direction): The left side of a ship or vessel when facing forward (formerly larboard). Denoted with a red light at night.
5. Toward the left-hand side of the ship when facing forward (formerly "to larboard").
6. (rowing): A sweep rower who rows with one oar on one side of a boat and primarily on the port (left) side of the boat.
port of registry
The port listed in a vessel's registration documents and lettered on her stern. Often used incorrectly as a synonym for home port, meaning the port at which the vessel is based, but it may differ from the port of registry.
port tack
When sailing with the wind coming from the port side of the vessel. Vessels on port tack must give way to those on starboard tack.
porthole

An opening in a ship's side, especially a round one for admitting light and air, fitted with thick glass and, often, a hinged metal cover, used as a window.
portolan
An obsolete form of nautical chart used prior to the development of lines of latitude and longitude that indicated distances and bearing lines between ports.
position light
An alternative term for navigation light.
post-captain
An obsolete alternative form of the rank of captain in the Royal Navy; once achieved, promotion thereafter was entirely due to seniority.
post ship
The British term used from the second half of the 18th century until 1817 for a sixth rate ship-rigged sailing warship armed with 20 to 26 guns, smaller than a frigate but large enough to require a post-captain as her commanding officer.
powder hulk
A hulk used to store gunpowder.
powder magazine
A small room/closet area in the hull of the ship used for storing gunpowder in barrels, or "kegs", usually located centrally so as to have easy access to the grated loading area. Sometimes may be an enclosed closet with a door, so it can be locked and only the captain would have the key, similar to how rum is stored.
pratique
The license given to a ship to enter port on assurance from her captain that she is free from contagious disease. A ship can signal a request for pratique by flying a square solid-yellow flag. The clearance granted is commonly referred to as free pratique.
predreadnought
A term used retrospectively after 1906 for a wide variety of steam battleships built between the 1880s and c. 1905 designed with only a few large guns for long-range fire, relying on an intermediate secondary battery used at shorter ranges for most of their offensive power, and having triple-expansion steam engines. They were rendered obsolete by the revolutionary dreadnought battleships, which began to appear in 1906 and differed from predreadnoughts in having steam turbine propulsion and an "all-big-gun" armament layout in which the ship's primary gun power resided in a primary battery of its largest guns intended for use at long range, with other gun armament limited to small weapons intended for close-range defense against torpedo boats and other small warships.
press gang
Formed body of personnel from a ship of the Royal Navy (either a ship seeking personnel for its own crew or from a "press tender" seeking men for a number of ships) that would identify and force ("press") men, usually merchant sailors, into service on naval ships, usually against their will.
preventer

A sail control line originating at some point on the boom leading to a fixed point on the boat's deck or rail (usually a cleat or pad eye) used to prevent or moderate the effects of an accidental jibe.
Principal Naval Transport Officer
In British usage, a Principal Naval Transport Officer is a shore-based flag officer or captain responsible for sea transport duties, and for assisting the Senior Naval Officer in the preparation of naval orders and conducting disembarkations.
Principal Warfare Officer (PWO)
One of a number of Warfare branch specialist officers.
prison ship

A vessel used as a prison, often to hold convicts awaiting transportation to penal colonies; particularly common in the British Empire in the 18th and 19th centuries.
private ship
In British usage, a commissioned warship in active service that is not being used as the flagship of a flag officer. The term does not imply in any way that the ship is privately owned.
privateer

A privately owned ship authorised by a national power (by means of a letter of marque) to conduct hostilities against an enemy.
prize
A property captured at sea in virtue of the rights of war, e.g. an enemy warship or merchant vessel.
prize crew
Members of a warship's crew assigned to man a vessel taken as a prize.
promenade deck
An open-air upper deck of a passenger ship on which passengers can stroll or relax.
propeller
1. (fixed) A propeller mounted on a rigid shaft protruding from the hull of a vessel, usually driven by an inboard motor.
2. (folding) A propeller with folding blades, furling to reduce drag on a sailing vessel when not in use.
propeller walk

The tendency for a propeller to push the stern sideways. In theory, a right-hand propeller in reverse will walk the stern to port.
prow
1. The forwardmost part of a vessel's bow above her waterline.
2. An alternative term for the bow of a vessel, sometimes used poetically.
puddening
Fibres of old rope packed between spars or used as a fender.
puffer
See Clyde puffer.
pulling
(of an oar, as used at sea) using an oar for propulsion of a boat where each person (of several) uses one oar. This contrasts with rowing (at sea), where each person uses two oars, one each side of the boat. See row for a full explanation of the complexities of the strict definitions.
pump boat
An outrigger canoe powered by a small gasoline engine or diesel engine, used in the Philippines and by Sama-Bajau migrants and refugees in Sabah and eastern Indonesia.
punt
A flat-bottomed boat with a square-cut bow designed for use in small rivers or other shallow water and typically propelled by pushing against the riverbed with a pole. In this way it differs from a gondola, which is propelled by an oar.
punting
Boating in a punt.
purchase
A mechanical method of increasing force, such as a tackle or lever.
purser
The person who buys, stores, and sells all stores on board ships, including victuals, rum, and tobacco. Originally a private merchant, latterly a warrant officer.

Contents: Top	A	B	C	D	E	F	G	H	I	J	K	L	M	N	O	P	Q	R	S	T	U	V	W	X	Y	Z	See also	References

== Q ==
quarter
Designation for the aft part of the ship between 120° and 180° to starboard (the starboard quarter), or 180° and 240° to port (the port quarter).
quarterdeck
The aftermost deck of a warship. During the Age of Sail, the quarterdeck was the preserve of the ship's officers.
quartering sea
Seas approaching a vessel from between 105° and 165° to port or starboard. Aft of a beam sea and abeam of a following sea.
quartermaster
1. In merchant marine usage, the seaman responsible for steering a ship. In naval usage, additional duties in running the ship's routine are included.
2. US Navy enlisted rating (QM) who, in addition to the above duties, assists with the navigation of the ship.
Queen's Regulations

The standing orders governing the British Royal Navy issued in the name of the current monarch.
quay
1. A stone or concrete structure on navigable water used for loading and unloading vessels, generally synonymous with a wharf, although the solid foundations of a quay contrast with the closely spaced piles of a wharf. When "quay" and "wharf" are used as synonyms, the term "quay" is more common in everyday speech in the United Kingdom, many Commonwealth countries, and Ireland, while "wharf" is more commonly used in the United States.
2. To land or tie up at a quay.
quayside
1. An area alongside a quay.
2. Being alongside a quay, e.g. "The ship is moored quayside."
quickwork

The ceiling inside the hull above the turn of the bilge, usually being of lighter dimensions than the ceiling lower down (spirketting).
quoin
A wedge used to assist in the aiming of a cannon

Contents: Top	A	B	C	D	E	F	G	H	I	J	K	L	M	N	O	P	Q	R	S	T	U	V	W	X	Y	Z	See also	References

== R ==
rabbet

A groove cut in wood to form part of a joint.
radar
An electronic system designed to transmit radio signals and receive reflected images of those signals from a "target" in order to determine the bearing and distance to the target. The term is an acronym for "radio detection and ranging".
radar reflector
A special fixture fitted to a vessel or incorporated into the design of certain aids to navigation to enhance their ability to reflect radar energy. In general, these fixtures materially improve the visibility for use by vessels with radar.
raft
A flat structure used for support or transportation over water, lacking a hull and kept afloat by buoyant materials or structures such as wood, balsa, barrels, drums, inflated air chambers such as pontoons, or extruded polystyrene blocks.
raft ship
Another name for a disposable ship.
rail meat
A term used to describe the members of a sailboat crew that are using their body weight to control the angle of heel of the boat.
rake
To incline from the perpendicular; something so inclined is said to be raked or raking (e.g. a stem, stern, mast, funnel, etc.).
ram
1. A weapon consisting of an underwater prolongation of the bow of a vessel to form an armored beak, intended to be driven into the hull of an enemy vessel in order to puncture the hull and disable or sink that vessel.
2. An armored warship of the second half of the 19th century designed to use such a weapon as her primary means of attack.
3. To intentionally collide with another vessel with the intention of damaging or sinking her.
4. To accidentally collide bow-first with another vessel.
range
1. To lay out a rope or chain on deck in a zig-zag or (for rope) a figure‐eight pattern (as opposed to in a coil) so that it can run freely. The zig-zag pattern may be described as flakes.
2. The difference between the heights of the high and low tides – a figure that will vary from place to place and day to day.
3. The distance from an observer to a target, such as in gunnery.
range clock
A clockwork device used aboard a warship to continuously calculate the distance or range to an enemy ship.
range lights
See leading lights.
rating

1. In British usage, a junior enlisted member of a country's navy; i.e., any member of the navy who is not an officer or warrant officer.
2. In contemporary U.S. Navy and U.S. Coast Guard usage, rating is the occupational specialty of an enlisted member of the service, rate denotes enlisted pay grade, and rank generally applies to commissioned officer pay grades.
3. A classification system of Royal Navy sailing warships.
ratlines

The rungs fastened between the shrouds permanently rigged from bulwarks and tops to the mast to form rope ladders enabling access to the topmasts and yards.
razee
1. A sailing ship that has been cut down to reduce the number of decks.
2. To cut down a sailing ship to reduce the number of decks.
reach
1. A section of a stream or river along which similar hydrologic conditions exist, such as discharge, depth, area, and slope.
2. In sailing usage, a straight section of water that can be traversed in a single reaching maneuver, without tacking.
reaching
Sailing across the wind; i.e. bearing anywhere between about 60° and 160° relative to the direction from which the wind is blowing. Reaching can be further subdivided into "close reaching" (about 60° to 80°), "beam reaching" (about 90°), and "broad reaching" (about 120° to 160°). Compare beating and running.
reaching sail
A sail specifically designed for tighter reaching legs. Reaching sails are often used in racing with a true wind angle of 35 to 95 degrees. They are generally used before the wind angle moves aft enough to permit spinnakers to be flown.
ready about
A call to indicate imminent tacking. See also going about.
Receiver of Wreck
A government official whose duty is to give owners of shipwrecks the opportunity to retrieve their property and ensure that law-abiding finders of wrecks receive an appropriate reward.
receiving hulk

A hulk used in harbor to house newly recruited sailors before they are assigned to a crew.
Red Duster
A traditional nickname for the Red Ensign, the civil ensign flown by civilian vessels of the United Kingdom.
Red Ensign

A British flag flown as an ensign by certain British ships. Since 1854, it has been flown by British merchant ships (except for those authorized to fly the Blue Ensign) as the United Kingdom's civil ensign. Prior to 1864, ships of the Royal Navy's Red Squadron also flew it, but its naval use ended with the reorganisation of the Royal Navy in 1864.
red right return
A phrase used as a mnemonic to remember that the navigational standard for a vessel entering ("returning to") a port in the Americas (excluding Greenland), Japan, South Korea, and the Philippines is for her to steer so that red-marked navigational aids lie to starboard (to the "right") of an observer facing forward on the vessel, while green-marked aids must lie to port (i.e. to the "left"). This contrasts with the rest of the world, where the standard is the opposite, i.e. green markers must lie to starboard and red ones to port.
red-to-red
A passage of two vessels moving in the opposite direction on their port sides, so called because the red navigation light on one of the vessels faces the red light on the other vessel.
reduced cat

A light version of the cat o'nine tails for use on young sailors.
reef
1. (noun) Rock or coral that is either partially submerged or fully submerged but shallow enough that a vessel with a sufficient draft may touch or run aground.
2. (verb) To temporarily reduce the area of a sail exposed to the wind, usually to guard against adverse effects of strong wind or to slow the vessel.
reef-points
Lengths of rope attached to a sail and used to tie up the part of a sail that is taken out of use when reefed. In older systems, such as square or gaff rigs, the reef points take some of the load on the sail and distribute it to the boltrope; with slab reefing, the reef-points just keep the sail fabric controlled in a tidy manner. Reef points pass through the cloth of the sail, either being sewn to each side of the sail to fix them in position or going through eyelets.
reef-bands
Long pieces of rough canvas sewn across the sails to give them additional strength.
reef-tackles
Ropes employed in the operation of reefing.
reefer ship

1. A refrigerated cargo ship used to carry perishable goods that require refrigeration.
2. A shipboard refrigerator.
reeve
To thread a line through blocks in order to gain a mechanical advantage, such as in a block and tackle.
regatta
A series of boat races, usually of sailboats or rowboats but occasionally of powered boats.
regular ship
A term used by the British East India Company from the 17th to the 19th centuries for merchant ships that made "regular voyages" for the company between England (later the United Kingdom) and ports east of the Cape of Good Hope, a trade over which the company held a strict monopoly. The company chartered most of its ships; "regular ships" were those under long-term charter, and the company kept their operations under tight control. A set of "regular ships" set off for Asian ports during each sailing season (September through April), and returned up to two years later. The status and role of "regular ships" differed from that of ships the company referred to as chartered ships, country ships, extra ships, and licensed ships.
relative bearing
A bearing relative to the direction in which the vessel is pointing or traveling; the angle between the vessel's forward direction and an object, as measured clockwise from the bow. See also absolute bearing.
repair ship
A naval auxiliary ship designed to provide maintenance support to other ships.
replenishment oiler
A naval auxiliary ship which provides fuel and dry stores to other ships.
research vessel
A ship designed and equipped to carry out research at sea, especially hydrographic surveys, oceanographic research, fisheries research, naval research, polar research, and oil exploration.
reserve fleet
A collection of naval vessels fully equipped for service but partially or fully decommissioned because they are not currently needed. In the modern United States, a reserve fleet is sometimes informally called a ghost fleet. During the Age of Sail and well into the 19th century, ships in a reserve fleet were said to be in ordinary.
rib tickler
A bargeman's name for the tiller.
riding light
A light hung from the forestay when at anchor.
riding turn
a type of jam of the rope on a winch drum: the heavily loaded part of the rope unintentionally rises over the successive turns on the winch, so stopping them from moving.
rig
1. The arrangement of masts, sails, and rigging on a sailing vessel.
2. To fit a sailing vessel with its masts, sails or rigging.
rigging
The system of masts and lines on ships and other sailing vessels.
rigging chocks
Thick blocks of wood fixed outside the rails to take the chain plates for the shrouds.
rigging screw
A bottle screw used to keep wires taut.
righting
The process of restoring a capsized vessel to upright condition.
righting couple
righting moment
The force that tends to restore a ship to upright equilibrium once a heel has altered the relationship between the vessel's center of buoyancy and center of gravity.
rigol
The rim or "eyebrow" above a porthole or scuttle.
rip rap
A man-made pile of rocks and rubble used as a base to support an aid to navigation, often an offshore lighthouse.
ro-ro
See roll-on/roll-off ship.
roads
See roadstead.
roadstead

A sheltered area outside a harbour where a ship can lie safe at anchor, often situated in a "shallow indentation of the coast".
Roaring Forties
An area of persistent strong westerly winds found in the Southern Hemisphere, generally between the latitudes of 40 and 50 degrees south. During the Age of Sail, ships took advantage of the Roaring Forties to speed their trips, and yacht sailors still do today.
roband
A piece of rope or sennit that fastens a cringle or an eyelet in the edge of a sail to a spar. One roband is used at each position. The alternative is to use a single piece of rope to lace along the whole length the spar. Often seen in bending the head of a square sail to a yard, being tied either to the jackstay or around the whole yard if there is no jackstay.
rode

The anchor line, rope, or cable connecting the anchor chain to the vessel.
rogue wave
Any unusually large wave for a given sea state; formally, a wave whose height is more than twice the significant wave height of that sea state (i.e. the mean of the largest third of waves in a wave record).
roll
1. The side-to-side motion of a vessel as it rotates about the fore-aft (longitudinal) axis. Listing is a lasting, stable tilt, or heel, along this longitudinal axis.
2. Another name for the longitudinal axis itself (e.g. the "roll axis").
roller
rolling swell
Swell that has increased in height due to influence of the bottom in shallow water, but before it is high enough to break.
roll-on/roll-off ship

A vessel designed to carry wheeled cargo that can drive on and off the ship on its own wheels.
rolling-tackle
A number of pulleys, engaged to confine the yard to the weather side of a mast; this tackle is much used in a rough sea.
rolling vang
A second set of sprit-head vangs played out forward to rail near the bows, used to give additional control and support when needed in a seaway.
romper
In a convoy, a ship that breaks ranks and "romps" ahead out of formation with the other ships.
ropes, the
1. All cordage; the lines in the rigging.
2. Any cordage of over 1 inch (2.5 cm) in diameter.
rope's end
A summary punishment device used as a flog.
rope yarn
1. A period, traditionally on Wednesday afternoons, when a tailor boarded a sailing warship while the vessel was in port; the crew was excused from most duties and had light duty mending uniforms and hammocks and darning socks. When the ship was at sea, the crew similarly was excused from most duties on Wednesday afternoons to engage in mending chores. Wednesday afternoons, like Sundays, thus were a more social time when crewmen rested from normal duties, similar to a Sunday, and, because the crew used rope yarn for mending, Wednesday afternoon became known as rope yarn Sunday.
2. After uniforms began to require less care, and through the mid-20th century, a period on Wednesday afternoons when naval crew members were excused from their regular duties to run personal errands.
3. Since the mid-20th century, any period of free time when a naval crew is given early liberty or otherwise excused from its normally scheduled duties.
4. One of the threads in a rope.
round to
To turn the bow of a vessel into the wind.
rove
1. A metal plate (with a hole in it) or washer placed over the protruding end of a nail driven through two timber components. The nail is deformed over the rove, so as to hold the timber components tightly together. Used particularly in clinker construction.
2. Past tense of reeve.
row
1. (in general speech) to propel a boat with oars
2. (more precisely, as used at sea) to propel a boat with oars, where each rower handles two oars, one on each side of the boat. This contrasts with the inland waters definition. When, at sea, a person is working just one oar, this is termed pulling
2. (more precisely, as used in inland waters) to propel a boat with oars, where each rower uses just one oar. On inland waters, one person using two oars, one on each side of the boat, is termed sculling
rowlock
1. The cutout in the washstrake of a boat into which an oar is placed, so providing a fulcrum when the oar is in use.
2. A common term for an oar crutch, the u-shaped metal fitting, with a pin underneath that fits in a socket in the gunwale of a boat to provide the fulcrum for an oar. See also thole pin.
royal
1. On large sailing ships, a mast right above the topgallant mast.
2. The sail of such a mast.
rubbing strake
An extra plank fitted to the outside of the hull, usually at deck level, to protect the topsides.
rudder
A steering device that is placed aft and pivoted about a (usually vertical) axis to generate a yawing moment from the hydrodynamic forces that act on the rudder blade when it is angled to the flow of water over it. There are several types of rudder, which generally divide into outboard or inboard. An outboard rudder is hung (hinged) on the stern of the vessel. An inboard rudder has a stock which passes through a gland in the hull, with the structure of the hull continuing towards the stern above the rudder. A spade rudder is hinged solely on the stock and has no lower bearing to help take the loads. Other rudder types may be hinged on an extension of the keel or on a skeg. Rudders may be balanced, by having some of the blade extend in front of the stock. On simple watercraft, the rudder may be controlled by a tiller—essentially, a stick or pole attached to the top of the rudder to allow it to be turned by a helmsman. In larger vessels, the rudder is often linked to a steering wheel via cables, pushrods, or hydraulics.

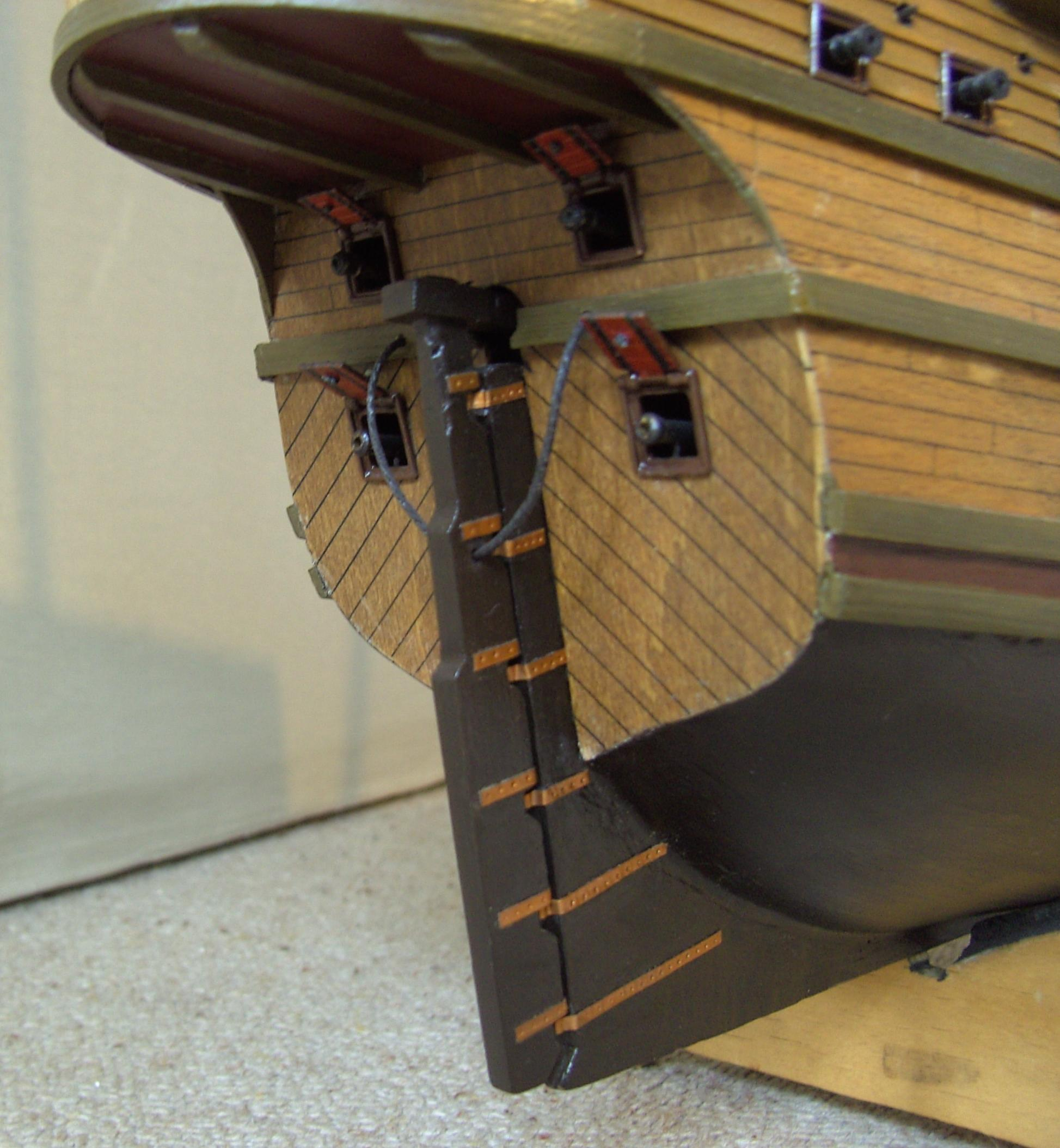
Model of a sternpost-mounted pintle-and-gudgeon rudder

rudder stop
A fitting that limits the swing of the rudder.
rudderstock
The structural part of a rudder that transmits the torque created by the tiller or steering gear to the rudder blade. It may consist of a steel tube which passes through bearings in the hull above the rudder, or with a stern-hung rudder, is the structure carrying all or some of the pintles or gudgeons on which the rudder pivots.
ruffle
A serrated iron ring attached to the barrel of the anchor winch and to which the pawl is applied to prevent backruns of the anchor chain.
rum-runner
See go-fast boat.
rummage

1. A place or room for the stowage of cargo in a vessel.
2. The act of stowing cargo aboard a vessel.
3. To arrange (cargo, goods, etc.) in the hold of a vessel; to move or rearrange such goods; the pulling and moving about of packages incident to close stowage aboard a vessel.
4. To search a vessel for smuggled goods, e.g. "The customs officers rummaged the ship."
rummage sale
A sale of damaged cargo (from French arrimage).
run
1. The stern of the underwater body of a ship from where it begins to curve upward and inward.
2. A voyage, particularly a brief or routine one.
running before the wind

Sailing more than about 160° away from the direction from which the wind is blowing (i.e. moving in the same or nearly the same direction as the wind). If moving directly away from the wind, it is called a dead run. Compare reaching and beating.
running (adjective)
A piece of the ship's rigging that is regularly moved in normal operation, as opposed to permanently or semi-permanently fixed in position. For instance a running bowsprit may only be put into its working position when a sail is set from it.
running backstays
A backstay that can be released and moved out of the way so that it does not interfere with sails or spars on the leeward side. On tacking, the new windward running backstay must be set up promptly to support the mast.
running gear
1. The propellers, shafts, struts, and related parts of a motorboat.
2. The running rigging of a sailing vessel.
running light
An alternative term for navigation light.
running rigging

Rigging used to manipulate sails, spars, etc. in order to control the movement of a sailing vessel. Contrast standing rigging.

Contents: Top	A	B	C	D	E	F	G	H	I	J	K	L	M	N	O	P	Q	R	S	T	U	V	W	X	Y	Z	See also	References

== S ==
safe harbour
A harbour that provides safety from bad weather or attack.
safe haven
A safe harbour, including natural harbours, which provide safety from bad weather or attack.
safety briefing
See muster drill.
saddle chock
A transverse beam placed over the transom with fairleads for mooring warps.
sagging
A condition in which the hull of a vessel deflects downward so the ends of the keel are higher than the middle. The opposite of hogging. Sagging can occur when the trough of a wave is amidships or during loading or unloading of a vessel and can damage her or even break her in half.
sail
1. A piece of fabric attached to a vessel and arranged such that it causes the wind to drive the vessel along. Sails are typically attached to the vessel and manipulated by sailors via a combination of mast, spars, and ropes.
2. The power harnessed by a sail or sails to propel a vessel.
3. To use sail power to propel a vessel.
4. A trip in a boat or ship, especially a sailboat or sailing ship.
5. In American usage, a tower-like structure on the dorsal (topside) surface of submarines constructed since the mid-20th century. A submarine's sail is similar in appearance to a fabric sail or fin, and is referred to as a fin in British and Commonwealth usage. It also superficially resembles the conning tower of submarines built before the mid-20th century, but differs from a conning tower in that a submarine conning tower contained instruments and controls for the periscopes to direct the submarine and launch torpedo attacks, while a submarine sail (or fin) does not perform these functions.
sail drive
A non-steerable drive leg fitted through the bottom of a sailboat carrying a propeller. Compare azimuth thruster and sterndrive.
sail loft
A large open space used by sailmakers to spread out sails.
sail-plan
A set of drawings showing various sail combinations recommended for use in various situations.
sailing canal boat
See canal schooner.
sailing canal schooner
See canal schooner.
sailing skiff
See skiff.
sailmaker
A craftsman who makes and repairs sails, working either on shore in a sail loft or aboard a large, oceangoing sailing ship.
sailorman
London term for a sailing barge, or a bargeman.
sally ship
A method of freeing a vessel grounded on mud, in which the crew forms a line and runs back and forth athwartships to cause her to rock back and forth, breaking the mud's suction and freeing her with little or no damage to the hull. When this is required, the crew is given the order "Sally ship!"
saloon
A social lounge on a passenger ship.
saltie
Great Lakes term for a vessel that sails the oceans.
salty dog
Slang for a sailor, especially for a seaman in the navy.
salvage tug

A specialized tugboat used to assist ships in distress or in danger of sinking, or to salvage ships which have already sunk or run aground.
salvor
A person engaged in the salvage of a ship or items lost at sea.
sampan
A relatively flat-bottomed Chinese wooden boat from 3.5 to 4.5 metres (11 to 15 ft) long, generally used in coastal areas or rivers and as traditional fishing boats. Some have a small shelter, and they may be used as a permanent habitation on inland waters. It is unusual for sampans to sail far from land as they are not designed to survive rough weather.
sampson post
A strong vertical post used to fasten the anchor cable or mooring warps, for towing another vessel, or to support a ship's windlass, the heel of a ship's bowsprit, the base of a cargo derrick or any other heavy load. In a smaller vessel, is usually fastened to the keel at its lower end.
sandsucker
A barge that collects sand from the bottom of lakes.
SB
S.B.
Prefix for "sailing barge", used before a ship's name.
scandalize
To reduce the area and efficiency of a sail by expedient means (slacking the peak and tricing up the tack) without properly reefing, thus slowing boat speed. Also used in the past as a sign of mourning.
scantlings
Dimensions of a ship's structural members, e.g. frame, beam, girder, etc.
schooner
A type of sailing vessel characterized by the use of fore-and-aft sails on two or more masts with the forward mast being no taller than the rear masts. First used by the Dutch in the 16th or 17th century. A topsail schooner has a square topsail (and may also have a topgallant) on the foremast.
schooner barge
A type of barge either converted from a schooner or purpose-built as a barge with a schooner rig, primarily in use from the 1860s to the 1940s, initially on the Great Lakes and later in salt-water environments as well. A schooner barge required a smaller crew than a schooner and needed to be towed, but under favorable conditions could hoist sails to reduce fuel consumption by the vessel towing her.
schuyt
Another name for a Dutch barge.
scope
The length of cable extended when a ship rides at anchor.
scow
1. A method of preparing an anchor for tripping by attaching an anchor cable to the crown and fixing to the ring by a light seizing (also known as becue). The seizing can be broken if the anchor becomes fouled.
2. A type of clinker dinghy, characteristically beamy and slow.
3. An inland racing boat with no keel, a large sail plan, and a planing hull.
scow schooner
A vessel with a scow-like (def. 2) hull and a schooner rig. Scow schooners appeared on the Great Lakes during the 1820s and served there into the 20th century, and also were common on San Francisco Bay and in New Zealand.
scow sloop
A vessel with a scow-like (def. 2) hull and a sloop rig. Scow sloops were common in North America by 1725.
Screaming Sixties

Strong westerly winds found in the Southern Hemisphere, south of 60 degrees. They are stronger than the similar "Roaring Forties" to their north.
screecher
A specialty sail which can be used as an upwind genoa sail, reaching sail, or downwind sail. The name comes from combining "spinnaker" and "reaching".
screw
1. A propeller.
2. Propeller-driven (e.g. a screw frigate or screw sloop).
scud
A name given by sailors to the lowest clouds, which are mostly observed in squally weather.
scudding
A term applied to a vessel when carried furiously along by a tempest.
scull
1. (v.) In sport or recreational rowing, especially on inland water, to propel a boat by oars, where each of one or several persons uses two oars, one on each side of the boat. This contrasts with the maritime traditional working boat or naval usage, where this activity is called rowing.
2. (v.) To propel a boat with a single oar resting in a notch at the stern, using a figure of eight motion of the blade of the oar, which is continuously immersed in the water
3. (n.) An oar used for sculling
4. (n.) A boat propelled by sculling, generally for recreation or racing
scuppers
Originally a series of pipes fitted through a ship's side from inside the thicker deck waterway to the topside planking in order to drain water overboard, with larger quantities drained through freeing ports, which were openings in the bulwarks.
scute

A flat-bottomed boat with a simple sail used to transport wine in the Anjou region of France.
scuttle
1. A small opening, or lid thereof, in a ship's deck or hull.
2. To sink a vessel deliberately.
scuttlebutt
1. A barrel with a hole in it, used to hold water that sailors would drink from. By extension (in modern naval usage), a shipboard drinking fountain or water cooler.
2. Slang for gossip.
scuttling
Making a hole in the hull of a vessel or opening seacocks, especially in order to sink a vessel deliberately.
sea
1. The ocean.
2. A body of salt water smaller than an ocean and generally forming part of, or connecting with, an ocean or a larger sea.
3. A large lake, usually one with salty or brackish water.
4. The swell of an ocean or sea.
5. A single wave, e.g., "A large sea struck the ship."
sea anchor
A stabilizer deployed in the water for heaving to in heavy weather. It acts as a brake and keeps the hull in line with the wind and perpendicular to the waves. Often in the form of a large bag made of heavy canvas. See also drogue.
sea chest
A watertight box built against the hull of the ship communicating with the sea through a grillage, to which valves and piping are attached to allow water in for ballast, engine cooling, and firefighting purposes. Also, a wooden box used to store a sailor's effects.
sea lawyer
an argumentative, captious sailor.
sea shanty/chanty/chantey
Work song to accompany rhythmical labor.
sea state
The general condition of the free surface on a large body of water with respect to wind waves and swell at a certain location and moment, characterized by statistics, including the wave height, period, and power spectrum. The sea state varies with time, as the wind conditions or swell conditions change.
sea trial
The testing phase of a boat, ship, or submarine, usually the final step in her construction, conducted to measure a vessel's performance and general seaworthiness before her owners take delivery of her.
seaboat
1. A ship's boat kept ready for immediate use at sea, and used, for example, for retrieving a man overboard, or taking a boarding party to another vessel. Usually rigged with patent disengaging gear that allows both falls to be released simultaneously and quickly, so enabling the boat to be launched from a ship with way on.
2. A term used for any vessel when assessing her physical behavior at sea. A vessel that performs well in challenging weather or sea conditions such as heavy seas is a good seaboat, while one which does not is a bad seaboat.
seaboots
High waterproof boots for use at sea. In leisure sailing, known as sailing wellies.
seacock
A valve in the hull of a vessel used to allow seawater into or out of the vessel. Seacocks are used to admit seawater for purposes such as cooling an engine, feeding a saltwater faucet, or scuttling a vessel, or to drain a sink or toilet into the sea. On warships, seacocks may be used to flood ammunition magazines with seawater to prevent them from exploding during a fire.
seakeeping
The ability of a watercraft to remain seaworthy in the conditions she encounters while underway. A vessel with a good seakeeping ability is very seaworthy even in rough weather.
sea-kindly
(of a boat or ship) Having a comfortable motion in rough seas
sealer
A vessel designed for or engaged in seal hunting.
sealing
1. The hunting of seals.
2. The internal lining of the sides and bottom of the hold. Also ceiling.
seaman
1. A generic term for a sailor.
2. Part of a low naval rank.
seamount
A large geologic landform rising from the ocean floor that does not reach the surface; an underwater mountain.
seaworthy
Certified for and capable of safely sailing at sea.
second mate

A licensed member of the deck department of a merchant ship, third – or, on some ocean liners, fourth – in command; a watchkeeping officer, customarily the ship's navigator. Other duties vary, but the second mate is often the medical officer and in charge of maintaining distress-signaling equipment. On oil tankers, the second mate usually assists the chief mate with tank-cleaning operations.
see you on the one

Used principally by pilots and river tug and barge deck and officer crew as a friendly farewell (similar to the phrase "catch you later") or more properly used in vessel to vessel VHF (or when needed ship's whistle) communication, along with its companion phrase "see you on the two" to indicate which side a head-to-head vessel crossing is going to occur. The correct response to the challenge is to repeat it back to the apposing vessel in agreement, and if not in agreement to ask for an alternative arrangement. The "on the one" indicates a single whistle sound signal, or port to port crossing, whilst "on the two" is a dual (two) whistle sound signal, or starboard to starboard crossing. In the US, a "one whistle" or port to port crossing is the normal and preferred crossing side.
seekers
London term for sailing barges that sought cargo, carrying cargo for other merchants at a fee, rather than for the owner.
seiner
A fishing vessel rigged to fish by seining.
seize
To bind two ropes together with small line.
self-sustaining
A merchant ship that can unload herself with no assistance from harbor facilities is self-sustaining, while a ship that needs harbor facilities to unload is non-self-sustaining. Self-sustaining ships are more expensive to build, maintain, and operate than non-self-sustaining ships, but have the advantage of being able to operate in less-developed ports that lack infrastructure.
self-unloader
Great Lakes slang term for a vessel with a conveyor or some other method of unloading the cargo without shoreside equipment.
semi-dreadnought
An advanced type of predreadnought battleship of the very early 20th century with an "all-big-gun" armament of mixed calibers. A semi-dreadnought differed from a conventional predreadnought, which had only a few large guns for long-range fire and relied on an intermediate secondary battery used at shorter ranges for most of her offensive power, but also differed from a dreadnought battleship, which dispensed with an intermediate secondary battery in favor of an all-big-gun main battery of the same caliber for use at long range. A semi-dreadnought had greater firepower at longer ranges than a conventional predreadnought, but lacked the long-range firepower of a dreadnought.
sennet
Cord formed by plaiting rope-yarn by hand. There are many types of plait, which may be flat, round, or square in section, and many uses.
sennet whip
A summary punitive implement.
serve
Cover a rope or splice by wrapping with thin line to protect it. Compare with whipping
set
The direction toward which the current flows.
settee
1. (settee) A lateen sail with its front corner cut off, giving it a quadrilateral shape. It requires a shorter yard than a lateen sail, and like a lateen sail requires a shorter mast than square-rigged sails.
2. (settee) A sharp-prowed, single-decked merchant sailing vessel of the 18th and 19th centuries found in the Mediterranean, particularly in the Levant, and also used by Spaniards in the Americas. Settees had two lateen-rigged masts, like xebecs or galleys, but had settee sails. Some polaccas carried a settee sail, giving rise to the polacca-settee (or polacre-settee).
settle
(of a ship or boat): sink lower in the water, often prior to sinking altogether.
sextant
A navigational instrument used to measure a ship's latitude.
shackle
U-shaped iron, with a screw pin at the open end used for securing stays to sails, allowing easy removal.
shaft
1. A propeller shaft. The term shaft can be used instead of "propeller" to describe the number of propellers a ship has, e.g., The ship has two shafts or The ship's engines drive three shafts.
2. To push or propel (a boat) with a pole.
shaft alley
The section of a ship that houses the propulsion shaft, running from the engine room to the stuffing box.
shaft log
A shaped piece of timber or metal fitted to a vessel's deadwood, keel, or keelson at the point where the stern tube passes through the hull.
shakedown cruise

A cruise performed before a ship enters service or after major changes such as a crew change, repair, or overhaul during which the performance of the ship and her crew are tested under working conditions.
shakes
Pieces of barrels or casks broken down to save space. They are worth very little, leading to the phrase "no great shakes".
shallop
1. A term used for a variety of boats and small ships used for coastal navigation beginning in the 17th century.
2. A large boat armed with cannon used by the Danes as gunboats during the Gunboat War (1807–1814).
shanghaied
The condition of a crewman involuntarily impressed into service on a ship.
sheave
(traditionally pronounced "shiv") The wheel in a block, which rotates as the rope runs.
sheave-hole
A hole or slot in a spar, fitted with a sheave to allow a rope to run.
sheer
The upward curve of a vessel's longitudinal lines as viewed from the side.
sheer line
The intersection of the external hull surface and the main deck surface, shown by a line on the sheer plan.
sheer plan
In shipbuilding, a diagram showing an elevation of the ship's sheer viewed from the broadside.
sheet
A rope attached to the clew and used to control the setting of a sail in relation to the direction of the wind. The sheet is often passed through a tackle before being attach to fixed points on the deck, or in the case of a barge, to a traveller on the main horse.
sheet anchor
Historically, the heaviest anchor aboard a sailing ship, to be used only in case of emergency, and located amidships. In more general usage, the term has come to mean a person or thing that is very reliable in times of emergency. For example, during the first inauguration of Thomas Jefferson, he advocated, "the preservation of the General [Federal] Government in its whole constitutional vigor, as the sheet anchor of our peace at home and safety abroad."
sheet bend
A bend to attach a rope to a small eye or clew, e.g. to attach a hammock to a clew or a painter to the Jacobs Ladder.
shell

An extremely narrow, and often disproportionately long, rowing boat outfitted with long oars, outriggers to hold the oarlocks away from the boat, and sliding seats, specifically designed for racing or exercise.
shelter deck
An upper deck having no overhead protection from the weather itself, but sheltering the deck below it.
shift colors
1. Changing the flag and pennant display when a moored vessel becomes underway, and vice versa. A highly coordinated display that ships take pride in; the desired effect is that of one set of flags vanishing while another set flashes out at precisely the same time.
2. Slang for changing out of one's Navy uniform into civilian clothes to go ashore. (The US Navy's newsletter for retired personnel is nicknamed Shift Colors for this reason.)
shift tides
Sighting the positions of the Sun and Moon using a sextant, using a nautical almanac to determine the location and phase of the Moon, and calculating the relative effect of the tides on the navigation of the ship.
ship
1. Strictly, a sailing vessel of three-masts or more and square-rigged on all masts.
2. More generally, any medium or larger seagoing vessel. Smaller vessels or those used in sheltered waters are generally called boats. Exceptions include submarines, which are always referred to as boats.
3. To send (an item or cargo) via waterborne transport, or in the derived meaning, by any means of transport (such as rail).
4. To bring something aboard a vessel.
5. To put something in its place aboard a vessel, ready for use.
6. To take employment to serve aboard a vessel.
7. To embark or travel on a vessel.
8. To take water over the bow or sides of a vessel, e.g., "The freighter shipped a great deal of water during the storm."
ship a sea
(Of a ship or boat): be flooded by a wave.
ship breaking

The demolition of ships for spare parts and scrap metal. A ship on her way to be scrapped is said to be going to the breakers.
ship cemetery
Another name for a ship graveyard.
ship classification society

A non-governmental organization that establishes and maintains technical standards for the construction and operation of ships and offshore structures.
ship-of-the-line
A type of sailing warship constructed from the 1600s through the mid-1800s to serve as part of the line of battle; one of the largest and most powerful warships of the era.
ship graveyard

1. A location where the hulls of discarded ships are left to decay and disintegrate.
2. An area where shipwrecks accumulate due to hazardous navigation conditions, deliberate scuttling, or losses in combat.
3. An anchorage for ships of a reserve fleet.
ship over
To reenlist. When a sailor extends his or her service another term.
ship-polacca
A three-masted polacca.
ship rig
See full-rigged ship.
ship sloop
A type of sloop-of-war introduced in the 1740s that had three square-rigged masts (in contrast to the brig sloop introduced in the 1770s, which had two masts).
ship stores
The materials, supplies and equipment required for the navigation, maintenance, operation and upkeep of a ship.
ship taken up from trade
See STUFT.
ship's bell
Striking the ship's bell is the traditional method of marking time and regulating the crew's watches. Each bell (from one to eight) represents a 30-minute period since the beginning of a four-hour watch. For example, in the classical system, "Three bells in the morning watch" represents 90 minutes since the beginning of the morning watch, or 5:30 AM. "Eight bells" indicates the end of a watch.
ship's biscuit
See hard tack.
ship's company
The crew of a ship.
ship's complement
The number of persons in a ship's crew, including officers.
ship's husband
A legal term for an agent based on land, who has authority to make repairs and attend to the management, equipment, and general management of a ship in the home port.
ships husbandry
All aspects of maintenance, cleaning, and general upkeep of the hull, rigging, and equipment of a ship. It may also be used to refer to aspects of maintenance which are not specifically covered by the technical departments.
shipbreach
Another name for a shipwreck.
shipping
1. Passage or transport on a ship; maritime transport.
2. The body of ships belonging to one country, port, or industry.
shipshape
Meticulously neat and tidy. A sailor is expected to keep his or her quarters shipshape, with all items arranged neatly and securely, both to save space aboard ship and because of the danger posed by loose objects if the ship encounters turbulent seas.
shipwreck
1. The remains of a ship that has sunk.
2. The remains of a ship that has run aground such that she is no longer seaworthy.
3. An event in which a ship sinks or otherwise becomes a wreck.
shipwrecking
To wreck a ship through a mishap.
shipwrecked
A person marooned due to the loss of a ship he or she was aboard is said to be shipwrecked.
shipwright
A person who designs, builds, and repairs ships, especially wooden ones.
shipyard
A facility where ships or boats are built and repaired. Routinely used as a synonym for dockyard, although dockyard is sometimes associated more closely with a facility used for maintenance and basing activities, while shipyard sometimes is associated more closely with a facility used in construction.
shoal
Shallow water that is a hazard to navigation.
shoal draught
An especially shallow draught on a vessel, making the vessel capable of sailing in unusually shallow water.
shore leave
Free time given to officers and crew of a naval vessel when they are off duty and allowed to disembark and spend time on land. See also liberty.
short stay
The relative slackness of an anchor chain; "short stay" means the chain is somewhat slack, and neither vertical nor fully extended.
shorten
1. To take in the slack of (a rope).
2. To reduce (sail) by taking it in, e.g. "shorten sail".
shot across the bow
A shot fired close to and in front of a moving vessel to warn her to stop, often for boarding.
show your true colors
To display the correct flag ("colors") for your ship's sovereign allegiance after using a false or misleading flag, or flying no flag at all, to approach an unsuspecting enemy ship.
Shrieking Sixties
See screaming Sixties.
shrimper
A fishing vessel rigged for shrimp fishing.
shroud
A rope or cable serving to support a mast from either side.
sick bay
A compartment reserved for medical purposes.
sideboy
One of an even-numbered group of seamen posted in two rows on the quarterdeck when a visiting dignitary boards or leaves the ship, historically to help (or even hoist) him aboard.
sided
(of a timber in a wooden hull) The identifier of a measurement of a timber in a wooden hull, used, together with moulded, instead of width and thickness which could be ambiguous – length, the third dimension is not ambiguous. Sided identifies the measure across the surface of an individual timber which is at right angles to the moulded direction. Therefore this is the dimension across the top of a keel, the fore and aft face of a frame, or the athwartships face of stem or stern post.
sidewheel
1. A side-mounted paddle wheel used for propulsion by a paddle steamer.
2. Propelled by sidewheels (e.g. "sidewheel steamer").
sidewheeler
A paddle steamer propelled by a pair of paddle wheels, one mounted on each side.
single-banked
(of the arrangement of oars on a boat) having only one oarsman seated on each thwart, operating one oar on one side of the boat, with the oars alternating between port and starboard along the length of the boat. This contrasts with double-banked, where two oarsmen are seated on each thwart, each of whom operates one oar on their side of the boat. A third arrangement is to have one rower on each thwart working two oars, one on each side of the boat.
single up
to reduce the number of mooring lines to a minimum immediately prior to getting under way. In a small vessel this would usually be a reduction to a mooring line at just the bow and the stern. In a larger vessel this may be a reduction to headrope, sternrope and two springs.
siren
A sound signal that uses electricity or compressed air to actuate either a disc or a cup-shaped rotor.
sister ship
A ship of the same class as, and therefore virtually identical in design and appearance to, another ship. Sister ships share an identical or nearly identical hull and superstructure layout, similar displacement, and roughly comparable features and equipment. Often, sister ships become more differentiated during their service lives as their equipment (and, in the case of military ships, their armament) are separately altered.
skaffie
A type of small sailing vessel used for fishing, primarily during the 19th century and mostly in the Moray Firth region of Scotland.
skeg
A downward or sternward projection from the keel in front of the rudder. Protects the rudder from damage, and in bilge keelers may provide one "leg" of a tripod on which the boat stands when the tide is out.
skeleton crew
A minimal crew, usually employed during an emergency or when a vessel is inactive, generally consisting of the minimum number of personnel required to maintain or operate the vessel.
skiff
A small boat, traditionally a coastal or river craft, for leisure or fishing, with a single person or small crew. Sailing skiffs have developed into high-performance competitive classes.
skipjack
A type of sailboat used as a traditional fishing boat on the Chesapeake Bay for oyster dredging. It arose around the end of the 19th century as the successor to the bugeye as the chief oystering boat on the bay.
skipper
The captain of a ship.
skysail
A square sail set above the royals, typically only carried by large barques and ships, such as the Primrose Hill (1885), Oweenee (1819), and Mushkosa (1819).
skyscraper
A small triangular sail above the skysail. Used in light winds on a few ships.
slack tide
The period between rising tide and falling tide, or the period between falling tide and rising tide when there is no tidal-induced current.
slamming
Slamming occurs when wave or wind action cause part of the vessel to rise out of the water and then slam back down onto the surface of the sea.
slave ship
A large cargo ship specially converted for the transportation of slaves in the slave trade. Also known as a slaver or Guineaman, the latter term deriving from the Guinea coast of West Africa.
slaver
Another name for a slave ship.
slide
The cabin hatch on a barge.
sling
1. To pass a rope around something in preparation for attaching a hoisting or lowering tackle to it.
2. A band of rope or iron for securing a yard to a mast; chiefly used in the plural, slings.
slip
1. To let go a rope at a precise moment, such as when releasing the last attachment to a buoy, when getting under way.
2. To slip an anchor: to let go the anchor cable, abandoning the anchor so as to get under way in an emergency, rather than spend time hauling in the cable to raise the anchor in the normal way. The released anchor cable is usually buoyed to aid recovery later.
3. The difference between the theoretical distance traveled per revolution of a vessel's propeller and the actual advance of the vessel.
4. In marine engineering, the motion of the center of resistance of the float of a paddle wheel or the blade of an oar through the water horizontally.
5. In marine engineering, the difference between a vessel's actual speed and the speed it would have if the propelling instrument acted upon a solid.
6. In marine engineering, the velocity of the backward current of water produced by the propeller relative to still water.
7. In marine insurance, a memorandum of the particulars of a risk for which a policy is to be executed, usually bearing the broker's name and initialled by the underwriters.
slip rope
A mooring rope that is intended to be the last to be released when getting under way and is arranged so that it can be released from on-board. An example of this would be a rope that is led from the ship (or boat), through a ring on a mooring buoy, and then back to the ship.
slipway
A ramp on the shore by which ships or boats can be moved to and from the water. Slipways are used for building and repairing ships and boats. They are also used for launching and retrieving small boats on trailers towed by automobiles and flying boats on their undercarriage.
sloop
1. Since circa the 1850s, a single-masted fore-and-aft sailing rig with one headsail set on the forestay, and a mainsail abaft the mast. The sloop rig is very common in modern leisure sailing vessels.
2. In older usage, a sloop may have more than one headsail, but with the jib (the outer headsail) also set on a stay. This differentiated a sloop from a cutter of the same era, where the jib would be set flying and a running bowsprit was used. Any bowsprit that might be fitted on a sloop was part of the standing rigging and remained in place at all times.
3. Informally, a synonym for "sloop-of-war," although sloops-of-war are not rigged as sloops.
sloop-of-war
1. In the 18th and 19th centuries, a small sailing warship carrying 18 or fewer guns with a single continuous gundeck.
2. In the 18th and 19th centuries, any sailing warship bearing fewer than 20 guns.
3. In the 19th-century U.S. Navy, the term used for the type of sailing warship known in other navies as a corvette.
4. In the early and mid-20th century, a small oceangoing warship not intended for fleet deployments, and used instead for convoy escort, gunboat duties, etc.
slop chest
A ship's store of merchandise, such as clothing, tobacco, etc., maintained aboard merchant ships for sale to the crew.
slush
Greasy substance obtained by boiling or scraping the fat from empty salted meat storage barrels, or the floating fat residue after boiling the crew's meal. In the Royal Navy, it was a perquisite of the ship's cook, who could sell it or exchange it (usually for alcohol) with other members of the crew. Used for greasing parts of the running rigging of the ship and therefore valuable to the master and bosun.
slush fund
The money obtained by the cook selling slush ashore. Used for the benefit of the crew (or the cook).
smack
A traditional fishing boat used off the coast of England and the Atlantic coast of America for most of the 19th century and in small numbers up to the mid-20th century. Originally a cutter-rigged sailing boat, after about 1865 lengthened and given a ketch rig. Some had a topsail on the mizzen mast, others a bowsprit carrying a jib.
small bower
The smaller of two anchors carried in the bow.
smoking lamp
Restricted flame source lighted only during authorized smoking hours.
snag
1. Snag, also deadhead: A tree or tree branch fixed in the bottom of a navigable body of water and partially submerged or rising nearly to the surface that can pierce and sink vessels. Snags were a particularly severe hazard in the 19th and early 20th centuries; to be snagged is to suffer damage from or to be sunk by such a hazard.
2. An underwater obstruction on which equipment trailed from a vessel, such as fishing lines and nets, becomes caught, sometimes resulting in loss of the equipment.
snagboat
A river boat resembling a barge with a superstructure for crew accommodations, equipped with deck-mounted cranes and hoists for removing snags and other obstructions from rivers and other shallow waterways.
snatch block
A block with one cheek that is hinged, so that the bight of a rope can be inserted in the block (as opposed to threading the end of the rope into an ordinary block).
snipe
1. Member of a ship's engineering department.
2. Mythical object of a "snipe hunt" for inexperienced crewmembers.
snotter
A short rope, spliced together at the ends and covered with hide, that is seized to the mast to hold the lower end of a sprit.
snotty
Royal Navy slang for a midshipman.
snow
A form of brig where the gaff spanker or driver is rigged on a "snow mast", a lighter spar supported in chocks close behind the mainmast.
snub
To quickly stop a line that is running out - usually by taking or tightening a turn on a bollard, cleat or winch drum.
snug loaded
When all the cargo on a barge is stowed below in the hold and there is nothing on deck. In contrast to carrying a stack.
soft eye
An eye splice without a thimble fitted.
SOG
An abbreviation of "speed over ground", the speed of the vessel relative to the Earth (and as shown by a GPS). Referenced on many fishing forums.
soogee
To wash down (as the deck and paintwork of a ship.)
SONAR
1. An acronym for "sound navigation and ranging", a method of using sound pulses to detect, range, and sometimes image underwater targets and obstacles or the bed of the sea. See also echo sounding and ASDIC.
2. The equipment used to conduct such searches, ranging, and imaging.
SOS
International distress signal.
sou'wester
1. A storm originating from the southwest.
2. A type of waterproof hat with a wide brim over the neck, worn in storms.
soul, souls
With a quantifier, can apply to the number of people on board ship; hence, SOS, "Save Our Souls".
sounding

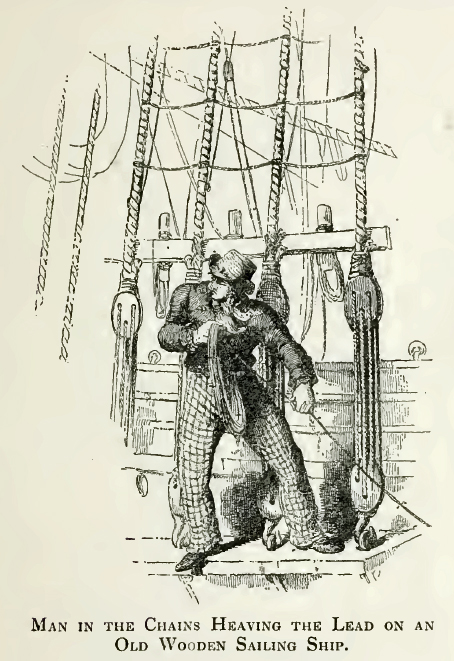
Sounding

1. Measuring the depth of the water. Traditionally done by "swinging the lead", now more commonly by echo sounding.
2. Measuring the depth of liquid stored in a tank onboard a vessel, typically used to determine its volume. See also Ullage.
spanker
A fore-and-aft or gaff-rigged sail on the aftmost mast of a square-rigged vessel and the main fore-and-aft sail (spanker sail) on the aftmost mast of a (partially) fore-and-aft rigged vessel such as a schooner, barque, or barquentine.
spanker-mast
The aftmost mast of a fore-and-aft or gaff-rigged five-masted vessel such as a schooner or barquentine. A full-rigged ship has a spanker sail but not a spanker-mast (see jigger-mast).
spar
A wooden (in later years also iron or steel) pole used to support various pieces of rigging and sails. The big five-masted full-rigged tall ship Preussen (German spelling: Preußen) had crossed 30 steel yards, but only one wooden spar – the little gaff of its spanker sail.
spar torpedo
A weapon consisting of a bomb placed at the end of a long spar and attached to a boat.
speaking tube
See communication tube.
spencer
A trysail.
speronara
A small merchant sailing ship originating in Malta and used in the Mediterranean Sea from the 16th to the early 20th centuries. A speronara usually had no deck and only one mast, often with a lateen sail or spritsail, although some larger speronaras had a half deck or up to three masts.
spider band

An iron band around the base of a mast that holds a set of iron belaying pins.
spindrift
Finely divided water swept from the crests of waves by strong winds. The presence of spindrift may be used to approximately estimate wind speed.
spinnaker
1. A large sail flown in front of the vessel while heading downwind.
2. A headsail set windward when running before the wind. The bargeman's spinnaker is his topmast staysail, tacked to the mast, and sheeted round the weather crosstree.
spinnaker pole
A spar used to help control a spinnaker or other headsail.
spirketting
The thicker planks of the ceiling, found at the bottom of the hold and continuing up the inside of the hull to the start of the quickwork (or lining).
splice
To join lines (ropes, cables, etc.) by unravelling their ends and intertwining them to form a continuous line; to form an eye or a knot by splicing.
splice the mainbrace
An order given aboard naval vessels to issue the crew with a drink, traditionally grog. The phrase "splice the mainbrace" is used idiomatically meaning to go ashore on liberty, intending to go out for an evening of drinking.
splinter fleet

Informal term for wooden boats of various types the United States armed forces used during World War II. Some of the boats were civilian vessels brought into service for the war, while others were built during the war specifically for wartime service. Some were transferred to Allied countries.
split lugsail
Two sails, foresail and mainsail on a lugsail yard, removing the need to dip the yard around the mast every time the vessel tacked.
sponson
A projection from the side of a vessel for protection, stability, or the mounting of equipment such as armaments or lifeboats. A sponson that extends a hull dimension at or below the waterline serves to increase flotation or add lift when underway. In salvage of a damaged or disabled vessel, a sponson may be a flotation tank attached to provide stability or buoyancy.
spoke
Spoke (to) another ship, as in "Spoke a brig from Rio" in Narrative of Arthur Gordon Pym of Nantucket by Edgar Allan Poe.
sponsor
The person, traditionally a woman, who christens a ship at its launching ceremony.
spotting top
A platform on a mast used to aid in gun laying.
spreader
A spar on a sailboat used to deflect the shrouds to allow them to better support the mast.
spring
A mooring warp that goes from the bow to a position on the quayside level with the stern (backspring) or led forward from the stern to a point level with the bow (forespring). A spring may be used in conjunction with the engine to swing the bow or stern away from a quayside to enable safe departure.
springs
Big tides caused by the alignment of the Moon and Sun.
sprit
A spar that supports a spritsail. It is attached to the mast near the deck and extends diagonally up to the peak of the sail. It is steadied by vangs.
spritsail
1. A fore-and-aft sail, where the peak is supported by a sprit. It may be free-footed or use a boom.
2. A rig that uses a spritsail.
3. A square-sail flown beneath the bowsprit.
sprittie
A spritsail-rigged barge.
spurling pipe
A pipe that connects to the chain locker, from which the anchor chain emerges onto the deck at the bow of a ship.
squadron
1. In general, any significant group of warships considered too small to be a fleet, but otherwise not strictly defined by size. In some navies, the term flotilla may be used instead of or in addition to squadron.
2. Such a group of warships assigned to and named after a particular ocean, sea, or geographical region, commanded by an admiral who may be the naval commander-in-chief in that theatre, e.g. the Asiatic Squadron, the North Atlantic Squadron, etc.; generally synonymous with similar naval formations known as stations.
3. During the Age of Sail, a temporary subdivision of a fleet.
4. A temporary detachment of ships from a fleet.
5. Especially in the late 19th and early 20th centuries, a permanent battle formation of a fleet, equipped and trained to operate as a tactical unit under the overall command of the fleet or when detached from the fleet.
6. Especially in modern usage, an administrative naval command responsible for the manning, training, supply, and maintenance of a group of ships or submarines but not for directing their operations at sea.
square
To place at right angles with the mast or keel and parallel to the horizon, e.g. "to square the yards".
square meal
A sufficient quantity of food. Meals on board ship were served to the crew on a square wooden plate in harbor or at sea in good weather. Food in the Royal Navy was invariably better or at least in greater quantity than that available to the average landsman. However, while square wooden plates were indeed used on board ships, there is no established link between them and this particular term. The OED gives the earliest reference from the US in the mid-19th century.
square rig
A generic type of sail and rigging arrangement in which the primary driving sails are carried on yards that are perpendicular, or "square", to the keel of the vessel and to the masts. A ship mainly so rigged is said to be square-rigged.
square rigger
A square-rigged ship.
squared away
Yards held rigidly perpendicular to their masts and parallel to the deck. This was rarely the best trim of the yards for efficiency but made a pretty sight for inspections and in harbor. The term is applied to situations and to people figuratively to mean that all difficulties have been resolved or that the person is performing well and is mentally and physically prepared.
squat effect
The phenomenon by which a vessel moving quickly through shallow water creates an area of lowered pressure under its keel that reduces the ship's buoyancy, particularly at the bow. The reduced buoyancy causes the ship to "squat" lower in the water than would ordinarily be expected, and thus its effective draught is increased.
squid
A derogatory term for a US Navy sailor.
SS
S.S.
An abbreviation, used as a prefix to ship names, for "Steam Ship" or—for the purist—"Screw Steamer" (ie, a steamship with screw propulsion). Compare with "PS", which stands for "Paddle Steamer".
stack
1. Another name for a funnel.
2. Deck cargo.
stack marking
A logo or other type of livery on a ship's stack indicating which private entity, such as a shipping line, or government agency owns or operates her. Generally, all the ships belonging to the fleet of a single company or agency will have the same stack marking.
stackie
A barge designed to take a large deck cargo, usually of hay or straw needed to feed working horses.
stanchion
A vertical post near the edge of a deck that supports life-lines; a timber fitted in between the frame heads on a wooden hull or a bracket on a steel vessel, approx one meter high, to support the bulwark plank or plating and the rail.
stand
(of a ship or its captain) To steer, sail, or steam, usually used in conjunction with a specified direction or destination, e.g. "The ship stood out of the harbor" or "The ship stood toward the east" or "The ship stood toward the missing vessel's last known position".
stand-on (vessel)
A vessel directed to keep her course and speed where two vessels are approaching one another so as to involve a risk of collision.
standing part
The section of a rope at a cleat or a block that is under tension, as opposed to the loose end.
standing rigging
Rigging that supports masts and spars and is not manipulated during normal operations. Contrast running rigging.
stanliff
A heavy wire cable attached to the mast at the hounds to support the weight of a spritsail at the heel.
starboard
The right side of a ship or boat; towards the right-hand side of a vessel facing forward (toward the bow). Denoted with a green light at night. Derived from the old steering oar or "steerboard", which preceded the invention of the rudder.
starboard tack
When sailing with the wind coming from the starboard side of the vessel. Vessels on starboard tack generally have right-of-way over vessels on port tack.
starter
A rope used as a punitive device. See teazer and togey.
stateroom
1. Originally a first-class passenger cabin. In modern usage, any passenger cabin may be described as a stateroom.
2. A superior cabin for a vessel's officer.
station
1. In chiefly 19th- and early 20th-century usage, a naval formation under a commander-in-chief who controls all naval operations, and sometimes all naval shore facilities, within a specified geographic area (e.g. the China Station, the East Indies Station, etc.); sometimes synonymous with squadron.
2. In Newfoundland, a harbour or cove with a foreshore suitable for a facility to support nearby fishing.
3. Naval station: a naval base (a naval air station is a base for naval aircraft).
4. Coaling station: a facility that supplies ships with coal.
station ship
A ship assigned to a particular station, such as a port or a geographic area, usually to support naval vessels and operations. A station ship may patrol the local area, or provide personnel to other ships, or provide fuel or services such as repairs.
stay
1. A strong rope supporting a mast and leading from the head of one mast down to some other mast or other part of the vessel; any rigging running fore (forestay) and aft (backstay) from a mast to the hull. The stays support a mast's weight forward and aft, while the shrouds support its weight from side to side.
2. To incline forward, aft, or to one side by means of stays, e.g. to "stay a mast".
3. To tack; put on the other tack, e.g. to "stay ship".
4. To change; tack; go about; be in stays, as a ship.
5. A station or fixed anchorage for vessels.
6. In stays or hove in stays: in the act of going about while tacking.
7. Miss stays: an unsuccessful attempt to tack.
stayfall
A flexible wire cable rove through blocks, one on the stemhead and one on the end of the forestay. This is the means by which the mainmast is lowered.
staysail
A sail whose luff is attached to a stay. If set on the most forward (or only) mast, a staysail is a headsail. Where more than one headsail is set, the staysail is generally the one closest to the mast.
steamer
steam vessel

A ship or boat powered by a steam engine.
steerage
1. The effect of the helm on a vessel; the act of steering a vessel.
2. A 19th- and early 20th-century term for the section of a passenger ship that provided inexpensive accommodation with no individual cabins.
steerageway
The minimum speed at which a vessel answers the helm, below which she cannot be steered. Speed sufficient for the rudder to "bite".
steering flat
The compartment on a vessel that contains the steering gear.
steering oar

A long, flat board or oar that went from the stern to well underwater, used to steer vessels before the invention of the rudder. Traditionally on the starboard side of a ship (the "steering board" side).
steersman
Another name for a helmsman.
steeve
1. A spar or derrick with a block at one end, used for stowing cargo.
2. To incline upwards at an angle (used especially of a bowsprit) rather than lie horizontally; to set at a particular upwards incline.
stem
1. An extension of the keel at the forward end of a ship.
2. On a barge, the foremost timber set vertically to the keel, forming the head of the stem; it carries the forestay and other rigging.
stern
The rear part of a ship, technically defined as the area built up over the sternpost, extending upwards from the counter rail to the taffrail. Contrast bow.
stern chaser
See chase gun.
stern tube
1. The tube under the hull bearing the tailshaft for propulsion (usually at the stern).
2. A torpedo tube mounted in the stern of a submarine.
sterncastle
Another name for an aftercastle.
sterndrive
stern drive

A propeller drive system similar to the lower part of an outboard motor extending below the hull of a larger power boat or yacht, but driven by an engine mounted within the hull. Unlike a fixed propeller (but like an outboard), the boat may be steered by twisting the drive. See also inboard motor.
sternender
Great Lakes slang for a vessel which has all of her cabins aft.
sternlight
A white running light displayed on the stern of a vessel.
sternpicker
A gillnetter that fishes by deploying a gillnet from the stern.
sternpost
The upright structural member (or post) at the stern of a (usually wooden) ship or boat, to which are attached the transoms and the rearmost corner part of the stern. It rests on ("fays to") the ship's keel, and may be vertical or tilted ("raked") slightly aft.
sternsheets
1. The area at the stern of an open boat.
2. The benches at the stern of an open boat that forms the or seating in the stern.
sternwalk
An external walkway or gallery for the use of officers installed on the stern, chiefly of British warships until the early 20th century.
sternway
The reverse movement of a boat or watercraft through the water.
sternwheel
1. A stern-mounted paddle wheel used for propulsion by a paddle steamer.
2. Propelled by a sternwheel (e.g. a "sternwheel steamer").
sternwheeler
A paddle steamer propelled by a sternwheel.
steward
A member of a vessel's crew involved in commissary duties or in personal services to passengers or other crew members.
stiff
A stiff vessel is one with a metacentric height high enough to make her more stable and less prone to rolling than other vessels. A stiff vessel contrasts with a tender vessel.
stood
See stand.
stocks
The frame that supports a ship or boat when it is being built.
stoker
See fireman.
Stone Fleet
A fleet of old ships loaded with stone, sand, or dirt and scuttled by the United States Navy during the American Civil War to block ports of the Confederate States of America in 1861 and 1862.
stone frigate
Informal Royal Navy term for a naval shore establishment.
stopper knot
A knot tied in the end of a rope, usually to stop it passing through a hole; most commonly a figure-eight knot.
stoppers
A short rope to check a cable in a fixed position. Anchor stoppers hold the anchor when catted, bitt stoppers and deck stoppers are used to retain the cable when at anchor, shroud stoppers contain a damaged shroud, and foretack and sheet stoppers secure the tacks until they are belayed.
storeship

1. During the Age of Sail and immediately afterwards, a captured ship used to stow supplies and other goods for naval purposes.
2. Since the mid-20th century, a type of naval ship that provides supplies, such as frozen, chilled, and dry provisions, and propulsion and aviation fuel to warships at sea for an extended period. In some navies, synonymous with replenishment oiler, fleet replenisher, or fleet tanker.
stove

(past tense of stave, often applied as present tense) To smash inward; to force a hole or break in, as in a cask, door, ship's hull, or other (wooden) barrier.
stow
To store or put away, e.g. personal effects, tackle, or cargo.
stowage
The amount of room for storing materials on board a ship.
stowaway
A trespasser on a ship; a person aboard a ship without permission and/or without payment, who usually boards undetected, remains hidden aboard, and jumps ship just before making port or reaching a port's dock; sometimes found aboard and imprisoned in the brig until the ship makes port and the prisoner can be transferred to the custody of police or military.
straggler
In a convoy, a ship that is unable to maintain speed and falls behind.
straight decker
1. Originally, a ship built with her pilothouse forward and engines aft to provide a continuous hold in between, a design commonly associated with ships which operate on the Great Lakes in North America.
2. In more recent usage, a Great Lakes bulk carrier which lacks self-unloading machinery.
strake
A continuous line of planking on a wooden hull going from bow to stern. In a small boat, this is usually a single plank, in a larger vessel a strake is several planks joined end to end. In a steel hull the same term can be applied to a continuous line of steel plates all fastened at the same level.
stretcher
A foot rest attached to a boat for a rower to use, taking some of the load created by the force applied to the oar. In competitive sport rowing, the feet may be attached to the stretcher. In working boats, it may be a simple adjustable wooden bar.
strike
1. To haul down or lower (a flag, mast, etc.).
2. To surrender the vessel to the enemy, from "strike the colors".
3. To remove a naval vessel's name from a country's naval register (after which the vessel is considered stricken).
4. An attack by a naval combat asset.
5. To undergo training (as a "striker") to qualify for an enlisted rating.
strike the colors
To surrender the vessel to an enemy, from the custom during the Age of Sail of lowering the vessel's ensign to indicate that she is surrendering.
stringer
a longitudinal structural element of a hull. In a wooden hull this is usually a timber fastened to the inner faces of the frames, going the length of the hull. In a fibreglass hull, stringers are usually moulded in fibreglass against the inner skin of the hull over a lightweight timber or other core material, so having a "top hat" section – this moulded structure runs in a generally fore and aft direction.
studding sails
(pronounced /ˈstʌnsəl/) Long and narrow sails, used in lighter winds, on the outside of the large square sails.
STUFT
British and Commonwealth acronym for Ship Taken Up From Trade, which refers to a civilian ship requisitioned for naval or other government service.
stumpy
1. A spritsail barge without a topmast. Normal form before 1850, the stumpies sprit was longer than those used in topsail barges, as the mainsail was cut with a higher peak.
2. A tops'l barge underway without her topsails set.
STW
An abbreviation of "speed through (the) water"; the speed of the vessel relative to the surrounding water (and as shown by a Log). Used in navigation.
subchaser
See submarine chaser.
submarine
1. Generally, a watercraft capable of independent operations underwater, able to renew its own power and breathing air. A submarine differs from a submersible, which has more limited underwater capabilities. By naval tradition, any submarine is referred to informally as a "boat" regardless of its size.
2. Most commonly, a large, crewed vessel capable of independent underwater operations.
3. Historically and colloquially, a broad category of vessels capable of submerged operations, including large, crewed submarines but also medium-sized and smaller vessels such as midget submarines and wet subs and vessels technically considered submersibles because they require external support, such as remotely operated vehicles and autonomous underwater vehicles.
submarine chaser

A small naval vessel designed for antisubmarine warfare, introduced during World War I and obsolete by the late 20th century.
submarine pen

A type of bunker designed to serve as a base for submarines that protects the submarines from air attack. The term primarily is associated with the submarine pens Germany constructed in France, Germany, and Norway during World War II to protect U-boats and therefore also known as U-boat pens. Submarine pens served as protected areas for the construction, fitting-out, and repair of submarines and to provide shelter for operational submarines in port and for submarines using a lock. Submarine pens also included offices, medical facilities, communication facilities, generators, ventilators, anti-aircraft guns, personnel accommodation, workshops, water purification plants, electrical equipment, radio testing facilities, and storage space for spare parts, fuel, and ammunition.
submarine tender
A naval auxiliary ship designed to supply submarines and support their operations. Known in British English as a submarine depot ship.
submersible
A small watercraft capable of operating underwater but which requires the support of a surface vessel, a surface platform, a shore team, or a larger undersea vessel such as a submarine. A submersible contrasts with a submarine in that a submarine is capable of fully autonomous operations, including generation of its own power and breathing air. However, colloquially, the term "submarine" often indiscriminately refers to any vessel capable of underwater operations, including those that technically are submersibles.
sunfish
A personal-sized, beach-launched sailing dinghy with a pontoon-type hull, daggerboard, and lateen sail mounted to an un-stayed mast.
supercargo
A person aboard a vessel who is employed by the cargo owner. Duties include selling merchandise in ports, as well as buying and receiving goods for the return voyage.
superfiring
Superfiring armament is a naval military building technique in which two (or more) turrets are located in a line, one behind the other, with the second turret located above ("super") the one in front so that the second turret can fire over the first.
superstructure
The parts of a ship or boat, including a sailboat, fishing boat, passenger ship, or submarine, that project above her main deck. This does not usually include its masts or any armament turrets.
surface warfare officer/specialist
U.S. Navy qualification and insignia for surface warfare training.
surfboat

An oar-driven boat designed to enter the ocean from a beach in heavy surf or large waves. Surfboats often play a lifesaving or rescue role when rescuers need to reach victims of a mishap directly from a beach.
surge
1. A vessel's transient motion in a fore and aft direction.
2. To let a small amount of rope on a bollard or winch drum pay out – a controlled slackening of a rope under tension.
survey vessel
Any type of ship or boat that is used for mapping a body of water's bottom, benthic zone, full water column, and surface for purposes of hydrography, general oceanography, marine salvage, dredging, marine archaeology, or the study of marine habitats.
S/V
An abbreviation of "Sailing Vessel", used before the ship's name.
swallow
The gap in the shell of a block through which a line passes over a sheave.
swatchway
A twisting channel navigable by shallow vessels at high water, generally found between sandbanks (e.g. in the Thames Estuary) or between a sandbank and the shore.
sway
1. A vessel's lateral motion from side to side.
2. (verb) To hoist, e.g. "sway up my dunnage".
sweep
1. A long oar used to row, steer, or maneuver an unpowered lighter or sailing vessel when there is no wind.
2. Rowing: A rower who rows with a single oar and primarily on only one side of a boat.
3. (verb) To search for an underwater object using a towed submerged line or device which will snag on the target.
4. (verb) To clear a body of water of dangers such s naval mines and obstructions, e.g., minesweeping.
swept
Cleared of dangers such as naval mines and obstructions, e.g., "The swept channel was safe for vessels to use."
swig
swigging
To take up the last bit of slack on a line such as a halyard, anchor line, or dockline by taking a single turn round a cleat and alternately heaving on the rope above and below the cleat while keeping the tension on the tail.
swimhead
swim-head
Having a straight overhanging bow and stern.
swimmie

A barge with a square overhanging bow, such as a swimhead lighter.
sweat
A technique to finally tension a halyard, by pulling alternatively on the tail from the cleat and at right angles on the taut standing line.
swinging the compass
Measuring the accuracy in a ship's magnetic compass so its readings can be adjusted, often accomplished by turning the ship and taking bearings on reference points. Essentially synonymous with "swinging the ship".
swinging the lamp
Telling sea stories. Refers to lamps slung from the deckhead that swing while at sea, and often used to describe a storyteller who is exaggerating.
swinging the lead
1. Measuring the depth of water beneath a ship using a lead-weighted sounding line. Regarded as a relatively easy job.
2. Feigning illness, etc., in order to avoid a difficult job.
swinging the ship
Turning the ship and steadying her on various headings while taking bearings on reference points to measure the accuracy of her magnetic compass. Essentially synonymous with "swinging the compass".
switch tack

To change course or heading.

Contents: Top	A	B	C	D	E	F	G	H	I	J	K	L	M	N	O	P	Q	R	S	T	U	V	W	X	Y	Z	See also	References

== T ==
tabernacle

A large bracket attached firmly to the deck, to which the foot of the mast is fixed. It has two sides or cheeks and a bolt forming the pivot around which the mast is raised and lowered.
tack
1. A leg of the route of a sailing vessel, particularly in relation to tacking and to starboard tack and port tack.
2. Another name for hardtack.
3. The front bottom corner of a sail.
4. A rope or purchase holding down the clew of a course.
tacking
1. A sailing manoeuvre by which a sailing vessel whose desired course is into the wind (i.e. in the opposite direction from which the wind is blowing) turns its bow toward and through the wind, such that the direction from which the wind fills the sails changes from one side of the boat to the other, thereby allowing progress in the desired direction. A series of tacking moves, effectively "zig-zagging" back and forth across the wind, is called beating, and allows the vessel to sail directly upwind, which would otherwise be impossible.
2. Another name for going about.

Overhead diagram of a tacking manoeuvre. The red arrow is the direction of the wind; note how the side of the sail that is filled by the wind changes as the vessel turns its bow.

tacking duels
In sailboat racing, on an upwind leg of the race course, the complex manoeuvres of lead and overtaking boats to vie for the aerodynamic advantage of clear air. This results from the ongoing strategy of the lead boat's effort to keep the following boat(s) in the blanket of disturbed bad air he is creating.
tackle
A pair of blocks through which is rove a rope to provide an advantageous purchase. Used for lifting heavy loads and to raise and trim sails.
tactical diameter
The perpendicular distance between a ship's course when the helm is put hard over and her course when she has turned through 180 degrees; the ratio of the tactical diameter divided by the ship's length between perpendiculars gives a dimensionless parameter that can be used to compare the manoeuvrability of ships.
taffrail
A rail at the stern of a boat that covers the head of the counter timbers.
tail
The loose end of a rope that has been secured to a winch or a cleat.
tailshaft
A kind of metallic shafting (a rod of metal) to hold the propeller and connected to the power engine. When the tailshaft is moved, the propeller may also be moved for propulsion.
taken aback
An inattentive helmsman might allow the dangerous situation to arise where the wind is blowing into the sails "backwards", causing a sudden (and possibly dangerous) shift in the position of the sails.
taking the wind out of his sails
To sail in a way that steals the wind from another ship. Compare overbear.
taking on water

Said of a vessel, to fill with water slowly, either because of a leak or because of waves washing across the deck. The term can be used to describe water entering the vessel by waves washing over her bow or stern, e.g., "The freighter took water over her bow," or "The motorboat took water over her stern." A vessel which continues to take on water eventually will sink.
tall ship
A large, traditionally-rigged sailing vessel.
tally
The operation of hauling aft the sheets, or drawing them in the direction of the ship's stern.
tanker

A ship designed to transport liquids in bulk.
target ship
A vessel, typically an obsolete or captured warship, used for naval gunnery practice or for weapons testing. The term includes both ships intended to be sunk and ships intended to survive and see repeated use as targets.
tartane

A small, lateen-rigged, single-masted sailing ship used in the Mediterranean for fishing and coastal trade from the 16th century to the late 19th century.
Task Force
Any temporary naval organisation composed of particular ships, aircraft, submarines, military land forces, or shore service units, assigned to fulfill certain missions. Seemingly drawn originally from Royal Navy heritage, the emphasis is placed on the individual commander of the unit, and references to "CTF" are common for "Commander Task Force".
tattle tale
Light cord attached to a mooring line at two points a few inches apart with a slack section in between (resembling an inchworm) to indicate when the line is stretching from the ship's rising with the tide. Obviously only used when moored to a fixed dock or pier and only on watches with a flood tide.
tell-tale

A light piece of string, yarn, rope, or plastic (often magnetic audio tape) attached to a stay or a shroud to indicate the local wind direction. They may also be attached to the surface and/or the leech of a sail to indicate the state of the air flow over the surface of the sail. They are referenced when optimizing the trim of the sails to achieve the best boat speed in the prevailing wind conditions. See dogvane.
tender
1. n. A type of naval auxiliary ship designed to provide advanced basing services in undeveloped harbors to seaplanes, flying boats, torpedo boats, destroyers, or submarines.
2. n. Also ship's tender, a vessel used to provide transportation services for people and supplies to and from shore for a larger vessel.
3. n. A vessel used to maintain navigational aids, such as buoys and lighthouses.
4. adj. A tender vessel is one with a metacentric height low enough to make her less stable and more prone to rolling than other vessels. A tender vessel contrasts with a stiff vessel.
TEV
T.E.V.
A prefix for "turbo-electric vessel", used before a ship's name.
texas
A structure or section of a steamboat that includes the pilothouse and the crew's quarters, located on the hurricane deck, in this case also called the texas deck.
texas deck

The deck of a steamboat on which its texas is located.
thimble
A round or heart-shaped grooved ring of iron inserted into an eye-splice.
third mate

A licensed member of the deck department of a merchant ship, typically fourth, or on some ocean liners fifth, in command; a watchkeeping officer, customarily also the ship's safety officer, responsible for the ship's firefighting equipment, lifeboats, and other emergency systems. Other duties of the third mate vary depending on the type of ship, its crewing, and other factors.
third officer
See third mate.
thole pin
A vertical wooden peg or pin inserted through the gunwale to form a fulcrum for oars when rowing. Often used in pairs to create a gap in which the oar is placed, but used singly if either the oar has a thickened section pierced with a hole which takes the thole pin, or if a leather strap holds the oar in place on the recovery stroke. See also rowlock.
throat
1. The forward top corner of a square fore-and-aft sail.
2. The end of the gaff, next to the mast.
three sheets to the wind
On a three-masted ship, having the sheets of the three lower courses loose will result in the ship meandering aimlessly downwind. Also used to describe a sailor who has drunk strong spirits beyond his capacity.
thunderboat
Alternative term for a hydroplane.
thwart

A bench seat across the width of an open boat.
tier
Vessels moored alongside each other offshore.
tiller
A lever used for steering, attached to the top of the rudder stock. Used mainly on smaller vessels, such as dinghies and rowing boats.
tilt boat
A square-sail ferry operating especially between London and Gravesend. Not less than 15 tons, carrying no more than 37 passengers, it had 5 oarsmen afore the mast. The "tilt" functioned as an awning.
timber
A general term for the individual pieces of the structural framework on which a wooden hull is built – for example a component of a frame
timber drogher
Another name for a disposable ship.
timber ship
Another name for a disposable ship.
timoneer
A name given, on particular occasions, to the steersman of a ship. From the French timonnier.
tin can
United States Navy slang for a destroyer; often shortened to can.
tinclad
A lightly armored steam-powered river gunboat used by the United States Navy during the American Civil War (1861–1865). Also called a light draft. A tinclad had thin iron armor, or in some cases thick wooden bulwarks rather than armor, sufficient to protect her machinery spaces and pilothouse against rifle fire but not against artillery fire. A tinclad contrasted with an ironclad, which had armor thick enough for protection against artillery fire.
tingle
A thin temporary patch.
toe-rail
A low strip running around the edge of the deck like a low bulwark. It may be shortened or have gaps in it to allow water to flow off the deck.
toe the line

At parade, sailors and soldiers were required to stand in line, their toes in line with a seam of the deck.
tompion

A block of wood inserted into the barrel of a gun on a 19th-century warship to keep out the sea spray; also used for covers for the ends of the barrels of the guns on more modern ships, the larger of which are often adorned with the ship's crest or other decoration.
tonnage
1. Any of various measures of the size or cargo-carrying capacity of a ship in terms of weight or volume.
2. Builder's Old Measurement, also tons burden: a volumetric measurement of cubic capacity used to calculate the cargo capacity of a ship, used in England and later the United Kingdom, from approximately 1650 to 1849 and in the United States from 1789 to 1864. It estimated the tonnage of a vessel based on her length and maximum beam. The British formula yielded a slightly higher value than the U.S. formula.
3. Deadweight tonnage: the total weight a vessel can carry, exclusive of the mass of the vessel itself.
4. Displacement tonnage: the total weight of a vessel.
5. Gross register tonnage: the total internal volume of a vessel, with one gross register ton equal to 100 cubic feet (2.8316846592 cubic meters).
6. Gross tonnage: a function of the volume of all of a ship's internal spaces.
7. Lightship or lightweight tonnage: the weight of a ship without any fuel, cargo, supplies, water, passengers, etc. on board.
8. Net register tonnage: the volume of cargo a vessel can carry.
9. Net tonnage: the volume of all cargo spaces on a ship.
10. Thames Measurement tonnage: the volume of a small vessel, calculated based on her length and beam.
top
The platform at the upper end of each (lower) mast of a square-rigged ship, located at the hounds. The top has two main functions. First, to provide a wide base for the shrouds of the topmast, so giving the correct geometry to give lateral support to the topmast. Secondly, to provide working space for those working aloft. See also fighting top.
topgallant
The mast or sails above the tops. See topgallant mast and topgallant sail.
tophamper
1. A collective term for the masts, yards, sails, and rigging of a sailing ship, or for similarly insubstantial structures above the upper deck of any ship.
2. Unnecessary spars and rigging kept aloft on a vessel's masts.
topman
A crewmember stationed in a top.
topmast
The second section of the mast above the deck; formerly the upper mast, later surmounted by the topgallant mast; carrying the topsails.
topmast pole
Part of the spar between the hounds and the truck.
topping lift
A line that is part of the rigging on a sailing boat; it applies upward force on a spar or boom. The most common topping lift on a modern sailing boat is attached to the boom.
topsail
The second sail (counting from the bottom) up a mast. These may be either square sails or fore-and-aft ones, in which case they often "fill in" between the mast and the gaff of the sail below.
topsail schooner
A schooner that sets a square topsail on yards carried on the foremast. A topgallant may also be set above the topsail. (The term does not apply to a schooner setting just fore and aft topsails above gaff sails.) There is some terminological variation, both over time and place, on what square sails a vessel may set and still be termed a schooner.
topsides
The part of the hull between the waterline and the deck. See also above-water hull.
torpedo
1. Prior to about 1900, the term for a variety of explosive devices designed for use in water, including mines, spar torpedoes, and, after the mid-19th century, "automotive", "automobile", "locomotive", or "fish" torpedoes (self-propelled weapons which fit the modern definition of torpedo).
2. Since about 1900, a term used exclusively for a self-propelled weapon with an explosive warhead, launched above or below the water surface, propelled underwater towards a target, and designed to detonate either on contact with its target or in proximity to it.
torpedo boat
A small, fast, cheap naval vessel of the latter part of the 19th century and first half of the 20th century designed to carry torpedoes into combat, thus threatening much larger warships. Replaced during the second half of the 20th century by the fast attack craft.
torpedo net
A heavy net a ship could deploy around herself using booms or spars while at anchor, moored, or otherwise stationary to protect herself from torpedo attack. A torpedo net hung at a distance from the hull sufficient to detonate a torpedo without significant damage to the ship. Torpedo nets first appeared in the late 1870s and were used through the World War I era, and they were used again during World War II.
touch and go
1. The bottom of the ship touching the bottom, but not grounding.
2. Stopping at a dock or pier for a very short time without tying up, to let off or take on crew or goods.
3. The practice of aircraft on aircraft carriers touching the carrier deck and taking off again without dropping hooks.
towing
The operation pulling a vessel or equipment through the water by means of lines.
track
The path traced by a vessel.
traffic separation scheme
Shipping corridors marked by buoys that separate incoming from outgoing vessels. Sometimes improperly called sea lanes.
trailboard
A decorative board at the bow of a vessel, sometimes bearing the vessel's name.
training ship
A ship used to train students as sailors, especially a ship employed by a navy or coast guard to train future officers. The term refers both to ships used for training at sea and to old, immobile hulks used to house classrooms.
tramp freighter
A cargo ship engaged in the tramp trade.
tramp steamer
A steamship engaged in the tramp trade.
tramp trade
The shipping trade on the spot market in which the vessels involved do not have a fixed schedule or itinerary or published ports of call. This contrasts with freight liner service, in which vessels make regular, scheduled runs between published ports.
tramper
Any vessel engaged in the tramp trade.
transmitting station
British term for a room located in the interior of a ship containing computers and other specialised equipment needed to calculate the range and bearing of a target from information gathered by the ship's spotters and range finders. These were designated "plotting rooms" by the United States Navy.
transom
1. A lateral member fastened inside the sternpost, to which the hull and deckplanks are fitted.
2. The aft "wall" of the stern; often the part to which an outboard unit or the drive portion of a sterndrive is attached.
3. A more or less flat surface across the stern of a vessel. Dinghies tend to have almost vertical transoms, whereas yachts' transoms may be raked forward or aft.
Transom stern
A stern which ends in a vertical "wall," or transom, a flat area that extends from the waterline or a point above the waterline up to the deck.
transport
See troopship.
travellers
1. Small fittings that slide on a track, rod, or line. The most common use is for the inboard end of the mainsheet.
2. A more esoteric form of traveller consists of "slight iron rings, encircling the backstays, which are used for hoisting the top-gallant yards, and confining them to the backstays".
An iron ring that moves on the main horse on a sailing barge. It is fitted with an eye onto which is hooked the main sheet, of the loose-footed mainsail.
trawler
1. Commercial trawler: a fishing boat that uses a trawl net or dragnet to catch fish.
2. A fisherman who uses a trawl net.
3. Naval trawler: a converted trawler, or a boat built in that style, used for naval purposes.
4. Recreational trawler: a pleasure boat built in the style of a trawler.
treenail

A wooden peg, pin, or dowel used to fasten pieces of wood together, such as the hull, gunwales, thwarts, etc.
trial trip
A (usually short) voyage for a new ship to test its capabilities and ensure that everything is functioning correctly. A new ship will usually have one or more trial trips before embarking on its maiden voyage.
triangular trade
A historical term for a pattern of trade among three ports or regions in which each port or region imports goods from one of the other two ports or regions in which there is no market for its exports, thus rectifying trade imbalances between the three ports or regions as well as allowing vessels to take the best advantage of prevailing winds and currents along the three trade routes. The best known example is the Atlantic triangular trade pattern of the late 16th through the early 19th centuries, in which vessels carried finished goods from northeastern North America or Europe to Africa, slaves from Africa to the Americas, and cash crops and raw materials from the Americas to either northeastern North America or Europe.
trice
To lift up something by means of a rope running through a block set above it, to get it out of the way. Most commonly used in tricing up the tack of a loose-footed gaff sai to reduce sail area and (sometimes) to give better visibility to the helmsman.
trick
A period of time spent at the wheel, e.g. "my trick's over".
trim
1. The relationship of a ship's hull to the waterline.
2. Adjustments made to sails to maximize their efficiency.
trimaran
A vessel with three hulls.
trimmer

A person responsible for ensuring that a vessel remains "in trim" (that the cargo and fuel are evenly balanced). An important task on a coal-fired vessel, as it could get "out of trim" as coal is consumed.
tripod mast
A type of mast introduced aboard warships in the first decade of the 20th century, consisting of three large cylindrical tubes or columns supporting a raised platform for lookouts and fire control equipment and later for radar antennas and receivers. In succeeding decades, tripod masts replaced the earlier pole masts and lattice masts. Tripod masts persisted in some navies until the 1960s, when plated-in structures began to replace them, and in other navies until the early 2000s, when stealth designs began to move away from any type of open mast.
tripping line
A buoyed line attached to the crown of an anchor to facilitate breaking it out.
troller
A fishing vessel rigged to fish by trolling.
trooping
Operating as a troopship.
troopship

Any ship used to carry soldiers. Troopships are not specially designed for military operations and, unlike landing ships, cannot land troops directly onto a shore; instead they unload troops at a harbor or onto smaller vessels for transportation to shore.
truck
1. A circular disc or rectangle of wood or a wooden ball- or bun-shaped cap near or at the top of a wooden mast, usually with holes or sheaves in it through which signal halyards can be passed. Trucks are also used on wooden flagpoles to keep them from splitting. The main truck is located on the main mast, the mizzen truck on the mizzen mast, and so on.
2. A temporary or emergency place for a lookout.
true bearing
An absolute bearing using true north.
true north
The direction of the geographical North Pole.
truncated counter
A counter stern that has been truncated to provide a kind of transom. It may have windows, serving a large aft stateroom. Popular on larger cruising yachts.
truss
The rope or iron used to keep the center of a yard to the mast.
trysail

A small, strong, fore-and-aft sail set abaft (behind) the mainmast or other mast of a sailing vessel in heavy weather.
tugboat

A boat that manoeuvers other vessels by pushing or towing them. Tugs are powerful for their size and strongly built, and some are ocean-going.
tumblehome
A hull shape, when viewed in a transverse section, in which the widest part of the hull is someway below deck level.
tuna clipper
A fishing boat based on the United States West Coast and used for commercial tuna fishing. A typical tuna clipper is diesel-powered, has her deckhouse forward and her bait tanks aft, and is outfitted with iron racks around her stem from which her crew uses heavy bamboo poles to fish for tuna.
turn
A rope passing behind or around an object such as a cleat, bollard or winch drum, usually with the purpose of controlling the rope. See also riding turn
turn to (turn two)
A term meaning "get to work", often hand-signed by two fingers and a hand motion in turning fashion.
turnbuckle
See bottlescrew.
turret
1. Originally (in the mid-to-late 19th century), a rotating, enclosed, armored, cylindrical box with guns that fired through gunports. Turret-equipped ships contrasted sharply with those equipped with barbettes, which in the second half of the 19th century were open-topped armored rings over which rotating gun(s) mounted on a turntable could fire.
2. Since the late 19th century, an enclosed, armored, rotating gunhouse mounted above a barbette, with the gun(s) and their rotating turntable mounted in the barbette protected by the gunhouse; in 20th- and 21st-century usage, this generally is any armored, rotating gun installation on a warship.
turtleback deck
A weather deck that has a distinct convex rounded over shape, similar to the back of a turtle. Used on ships of the whaleback type and on the forward weather deck of torpedo boats."
turtling
In dinghy sailing especially (but also in other boats), a boat is said to be "turtling" or to "turn turtle" when the boat is fully inverted with the mast pointing near vertically downwards, but may remain floating. (Note: However, "to turn turtle" means putting a turtle on its back by grabbing it by the flipper, and conversely is used to refer to a vessel that has turned upside-down, or has cast off its crew.)
tweendeck
A deck on a general cargo ship located between the main deck (or weather deck) and the hold space. A general cargo ship may have one or two tweendecks (or none at all).
tweendeck space
The space on a tweendeck available for carrying cargo or other uses.
tweendecker
A general cargo ship equipped with one or more tweendecks.
two six heave
A command used to co-ordinate a group of people pulling on a rope. Originally a sailing navy term referring to the two members of a gun crew (numbers two and six) who ran out the gun by pulling on the ropes that secured it in place.
two blocks
When the two blocks in a tackle have become so close that no further movement is possible as in chock-a-block.
tye
A chain or rope used for hoisting or lowering a yard. A tye runs from the horizontal center of a given yard to a corresponding mast and from there down to a tackle. Sometimes more specifically called a chain tye or a rope tye.

Contents: Top	A	B	C	D	E	F	G	H	I	J	K	L	M	N	O	P	Q	R	S	T	U	V	W	X	Y	Z	See also	References

== U ==
ullage
A measurement of the empty space in large tanks or holds for bulk solids. Used to determine quantity of material in tank for volume and stability calculations. Often used in place of sounding for tanks which may carry more viscous or aggressive liquids; or if the tank is extremely deep.
unassisted sailing
Any sailing voyage, usually single-handed, with no intermediate stops or physical assistance from external sources.
under the weather
Serving a watch on the weather side of the ship, exposed to wind and spray.
under keel clearance
The available depth of water below the keel.
under way
underway
(of a vessel) At sea; i.e. not at anchor, made fast to the shore, or aground. This definition has legal importance in the International Regulations for Preventing Collisions at Sea.
underwater hull

The underwater section of a vessel beneath the waterline, normally not visible except when in drydock or, historically, when careened.
underway replenishment
A method employed by navies to transfer fuel, munitions, and stores from one ship to another while underway. Sometimes abbreviated as UNREP.
U.N.P.O.C.
An abbreviation for "Unable to navigate, probably on course"; a 19th-century term used in log books of vessels left without accurate navigational guidance due to poor visibility and/or proximity to the North Pole (where magnetic compasses are difficult or impossible to use). Dropped out of common usage in the 1950s with improvements in maritime navigational aids.
unreeve
To remove a rope from a sheave or block.
unship
1. To remove from a vessel.
2. To remove an oar or mast from its normal position.
up-and-down
The description given to the position of the anchor chain, usually used when the anchor is being raised and indicating that the chain has been hauled in tightly such that the vessel is floating directly above the anchor, which is just about to be broken out of the ground. Used more rarely to refer to a situation where the anchor chain is slack and hangs vertically down from the hawsepipe.
up-behind
An order to slack off quickly and run slack to a belaying point. This order is given when a line or wire has been stopped off or falls have been four-in-hand and the hauling part is to be belayed.
upbound
1. Traveling upstream, against the current.
2. In the Great Lakes region, traveling westward (terminology used by the Great Lakes St. Lawrence Seaway Development Corporation).
uppers

The brails above the mains.
upper-yardmen
Specially selected personnel destined for high office.
urca
1. A type of ship of the 16th century that was used to transport military stores. Urcas were used mostly by Spain and mostly in the Mediterranean. An urca's rigging was similar to that of a galleon, but an urca usually was smaller and more lightly armed than a galleon.
2. An armed, flat-bottomed, high-sterned Spanish flyboat of the 17th and 18th centuries. Urcas were rigged in various ways, including lateen and square rigs. Urcas served as coastal trading vessels, and some saw use as naval dispatch boats.

Contents: Top	A	B	C	D	E	F	G	H	I	J	K	L	M	N	O	P	Q	R	S	T	U	V	W	X	Y	Z	See also	References

== V ==
V-hull
The shape of a boat or ship in which the sections of the hull bottom slope downward in a straight line to the keel.
vang
1. A line leading from the gaff to either side of the deck, used to prevent the gaff from sagging.
2. One of a pair of ropes leading from the deck to the head of a spritsail. It steadies the sprit and can be used to control the sail's performance during a tack. The vang fall blocks are mounted slightly afore the main horse while rolling vangs are extra preventers which lead forward to keep the sail to leeward in heavy weather.
3. An abbreviation of boom vang or gaff vang.
vanishing angle
The maximum degree of heel after which a vessel becomes unable to return to an upright position.
vedette

A small naval patrol boat used for scouting enemy forces.
veer
With regard to the wind, a clockwise shift relative to the vessel's current course. When this shift is counterclockwise, it is referred to as backing.
veer away
To let go a rope gently.
vertical replenishment
A method of supply of seaborne vessels by helicopter. Abbreviated VERTREP.
very good
very well
An affirmative response given by a senior to the report of a junior, e.g. if the helmsman reports, "Rudder is amidship, sir," an officer might respond, "Very good" or "very well."
vessel
Any craft designed for transportation on water, such as a ship or boat.
vessel of opportunity
A vessel not normally used for a specific function, but available and suitable for temporary application, often requiring temporary fitting or loading of necessary equipment.
viol

A large rope used to unmoor or heave up the anchor.
voice pipe
voice tube
See communication tube.
voyage
1. A long journey by ship.
2. To go on such a journey.
voyl
See viol.

Contents: Top	A	B	C	D	E	F	G	H	I	J	K	L	M	N	O	P	Q	R	S	T	U	V	W	X	Y	Z	See also	References

== W ==
waft
Another name for a signal flag.
waist
The central deck of a ship between the forecastle and the quarterdeck.
waist clothes

Colored cloths or sheets hung around the outside of a ship's upper works, both fore and aft, and before the cubbridge heads, used as an adornment during ceremonious occasions and as a visual screen during times of action in order to protect the men aboard.
wake
Turbulence in the water behind a moving vessel. Not to be confused with wash.
wale
1. A thicker strake, consisting of a wooden plank or group of planks, in the outer skin of the hull, running in a fore-and-aft direction, to provide extra stiffening in selected regions.
2. Alternative term for a gunwale.
wardroom
1. The living quarters of a naval ship that are designated for the use of commissioned officers other than the captain.
2. A collective term for the commissioned officers of a naval ship excluding her captain; e.g. "The captain rarely referred to his wardroom for advice, and this led to their discontent".
warm the bell
Royal Navy slang from the Age of Sail for doing something unnecessarily or unjustifiably early. Holding a half-hour marine sandglass used until the early 19th century to time watches under one's coat or in one's hand to warm it allegedly expanded the glass's neck to allow the sand to flow more quickly, justifying ringing the bell rung every half-hour to announce the passage of time on watch earlier than if the glass was cold, hence warming the bell and shortening the length of the watch.
warp
1. To move a vessel by hauling on a line or cable that is fastened to an anchor or pier, especially so as to move a sailing ship through a confined or restricted space such as in a harbour.
2. A line or cable used in warping a ship.
3. The length of the shrouds from the bolster to the deadeye.
warship
Also combatant ship, a ship that is built and primarily intended for naval warfare, typically belonging to the armed forces of a state, usually a navy. Unlike a merchant ship, which carries cargo or passengers, a warship carries only weapons, ammunition, and supplies for its crew. An auxiliary warship is a merchant ship taken into naval service and armed for use as a warship. The term battleship sometimes is used as a synonym for warship, but this is incorrect, as battleship has a far narrower meaning and refers only to a specific type of warship.
wash
The waves created by a moving vessel. Not to be confused with wake.
washstrake
An additional strake fastened above the level of the gunwale of an open boat to increase the freeboard.
watch
A period of time during which a part of the crew is on duty. Changes of watch are marked by strokes on the ship's bell.
watchstanding

The allocation of crew or staff to specific roles on a ship in order to operate it continuously. These assignments, known as watches, are divided into regularly scheduled work periods of several hours or longer to ensure that some portion of the crew is always occupying the roles at all times. Those members of the crew who are on watch at a given time are called watchkeepers.
water bus
A watercraft used to provide transportation on a scheduled service with multiple stops, usually in an urban environment, analogous to the way a bus operates on land. It differs from a water taxi, which is a similar watercraft that provides transport service to various locations on demand rather than on a predetermined schedule, analogous to the way a taxicab operates on land, although in North America these terms are often used interchangeably. A water bus also differs from a ferry, which usually refers to a watercraft that shuttles between only two points.
water kite
See paravane (definition 2).
water taxi
A watercraft used to provide transportation on demand to various locations, usually in an urban environment, analogous to the way a taxicab operates on land. It differs from a water bus, which is a similar watercraft that provides transportation on a scheduled service with multiple stops rather than at the rider's will, analogous to the way a bus operates on land, although in North America these terms are often used interchangeably. A water taxi also differs from a ferry, which usually refers to a watercraft that shuttles between only two points.
watercraft
Any vessel intended for transportation on water, e.g. ships, boats, personal watercraft, etc.
waterline
The line where the hull of a ship meets the water's surface.
watersail
A sail hung below the boom on gaff rig boats for extra downwind performance when racing.
watertender
See fireman (definition 1).
waterway
1. Any navigable body of water.
2. A strake of timber laid against the frames or bulwark stanchions at the margin of a laid wooden deck, usually about twice the thickness of the deck planking.
way
Speed, progress, or momentum, or more technically, the point at which there is sufficient water flow past a vessel's rudder for it to be able to steer the vessel (i.e. when the rudder begins to "bite", sometimes also called "steerage way".) To "make way" is to move; to "have way on" or "to have steerage way" is to have enough speed to control the vessel with its rudder; to "lose way" is to slow down or to not have enough speed to use the rudder effectively. "Way enough" is a coxswain's command that the oarsmen stop rowing and allow the boat to proceed by its existing momentum.
way-landing
An intermediate stop along the route of a steamboat.
way-lay
The verb's origin, from wegelage, means "lying in wait, with evil or hostile intent". So to be waylaid refers to a ship that has been taken off its course, route, or way by surprise, typically by unfortunate or nefarious means. In Herman Melville's 1851 novel Moby-Dick, the great white whale waylaid the Pequod and sank it, with only a few souls surviving in lifeboats.
waypoint
A location defined by navigational coordinates, especially as part of a planned route.
ways
The timbers of shipyard stocks that slope into the water and along which a ship or large boat is launched. A ship undergoing construction in a shipyard is said to be on the ways, while a ship scrapped there is said to be broken up in the ways. Also known as a slipway.
wearing ship
Tacking away from the wind in a square-rigged vessel. See also gybe.
weather deck
A deck that is continually exposed to the weather – usually either the main deck or, in larger vessels, the upper deck.
weather gage

Favorable position over another sailing vessel with respect to the wind.
weather helm
The tendency of a sailboat to turn to windward in a strong wind when there is no change in the rudder's position. This is the opposite of lee helm and is the result of a dynamically unbalanced condition. See also center of lateral resistance.
weather ship
A ship stationed in the ocean as a platform from which to record surface and upper-air meteorological observations for use in weather forecasting.
weather side

The side of a ship exposed to the wind, i.e. the side facing upwind or the direction from which the wind is blowing. Contrast lee side.
weatherly
A ship that is easily sailed and maneuvered, or which makes little leeway when sailing to windward.
weigh anchor
To heave up an anchor preparatory to sailing.
well
A place in the ship's hold for pumps.
well-found
Properly set up or provisioned.
West Indiaman
A British term used in the 18th and 19th centuries for any merchant sailing ship making voyages between the Old World and the West Indies or the east coast of the Americas, in contrast to an East Indiaman, which made voyages to the East Indies or South Asia. The term most frequently was applied to British, Danish, Dutch, and French ships.
wet
(of a ship) Prone to taking water over her decks at sea. For example, a ship that tends to take water over her bow can be said to be "wet forward."
wetted area
In sailboating, the portion of the hull immersed in water (i.e. below the waterline).
whaleback
1. A type of cargo steamship of unusual design formerly used on the Great Lakes of North America, notably for carrying grain or ore. The hull continuously curved above the waterline from vertical to horizontal, and when the ship was fully loaded, only the rounded portion of her hull (the "whaleback" proper) was visible above the waterline. With sides curved in towards the ends, whalebacks had a spoon-shaped bow and a very convex upper deck.
2. A type of high-speed launch first designed for the Royal Air Force during World War II, or certain smaller rescue and research vessels most common in Europe that, like the Great Lakes vessels, have hulls that curve over to meet the deck, although the "whaleback" designation comes not from the curve along the gunwale as in the Great Lakes vessels, but from the fore-and-aft arch in the deck.
3. A sheltered portion of the forward deck on certain British fishing boats designed, in part, so that water taken over the bow is more easily shed over the sides. The feature has been incorporated into some pleasure craft – aboard which it is known as a whaleback deck – based on the hull design of older whaling boats.
whaleboat
1. A type of open boat that is relatively narrow and pointed at both ends, enabling it to move either forwards or backwards equally well.
2. On modern warships, a relatively light and seaworthy boat used for transport of the ship's crew.
3. A type of vessel designed as a lifeboat or "monomoy" used for recreational and competitive rowing in the San Francisco Bay area and coastal Massachusetts.
4. Informally, any whaling ship of any size.
5. Informally, any vessel engaged in whale watching.
whaler
1. Also whaling ship. A specialized vessel designed for catching or processing whales.
2. A person engaged in the catching or processing of whales.
3. In the Royal Navy, a Montagu whaler, a ship's boat often used as a seaboat.
wharf
A structure on the shore of a harbor or on the bank of a river or canal where ships may dock to load and unload cargo or passengers. Such a structure includes one or more berths (i.e. mooring locations), and may also include piers, warehouses, or other facilities necessary for handling the ships. The term "wharf" is generally synonymous with quay, although the solid foundations of a quay contrast with the closely spaced piles of a wharf. When "quay" and "wharf" are used as synonyms, the term "quay" is more common in everyday speech in the United Kingdom, many Commonwealth countries, and Ireland, while "wharf" is more commonly used in the United States.
wharfage
1. A collective term for docks, piers, quays, and wharfs.
2. A collective term for all wharfs in a given port, area, country, region, etc.
3. A fee charged for the use of a wharf.
wheel

The usual steering device on larger vessels: a wheel with a horizontal axis, connected by cables to the rudder.
wheelhouse

The location on a ship where the wheel is located.
whelkie
A small sailing pram.
wherry
A type of boat traditionally used for carrying cargo or passengers on rivers and canals in England, particularly on the River Thames and the Norfolk and Suffolk Broads.
whiff
A chiefly British term for a narrow clinker-built skiff having outriggers and designed for one oarsman.
whip
A small single block tackle, used to raise light loads from a hold.
whip upon whip
Connecting two whips together. This runs more smoothly than using a double block with single block tackle, which would have the equivalent purchase. Can be used for topsail and top-gallant halliards.
whipping
The binding with twine of the loose end of a rope to prevent it unravelling.
whipstaff
A vertical lever connected to a tiller, used for steering on larger ships before the development of the ship's wheel.
whiskers
Spreaders from the bow to spread the bowsprit shrouds.
whiskerstay
One of the pair of stays that stabilize the bowsprit, horizontally affixed to the forward end of the bowsprit and just aft the stem.
white horses

Foam or spray on wave tops caused by stronger winds (usually above Force 4).
White Ensign
A British flag flown as an ensign by certain British ships. Prior to 1864, ships of the Royal Navy's White Squadron flew it; since the reorganisation of the Royal Navy in 1864, it has been flown by all Royal Navy ships and shore establishments, yachts of members of the Royal Yacht Squadron, and ships of Trinity House escorting the reigning monarch of the United Kingdom.
wide berth
To leave room between two ships moored (berthed) in order to allow space for manoeuvring.
Williamson turn
A type of man overboard rescue turn. Other variations include the Anderson turn, the quick turn, and the Scharnow turn.
winch
A mechanical device for pulling on a rope (such as a sheet or halyard), usually equipped with a pawl to assist in control. It may be hand-operated or powered.
wind-over-tide
Sea conditions in which a tidal current and a wind are moving in opposite directions, leading to short, heavy seas.
windage
The wind resistance of a boat.
windbound
A condition wherein a ship is detained in one particular station by contrary winds.
winding tackle
A tackle formed of two triple blocks or a triple and a double, used to raise heavy loads such as guns and anchors.
windjammer
A large iron- or steel-hulled square-rigged sailing ship of the late 19th and early 20th centuries with three, four, or five masts, built mainly between the 1870s and 1900 to carry cargo on long voyages.
windlass
A winch mechanism, usually with a horizontal axis, designed to move very heavy loads. Used where mechanical advantage greater than that obtainable by block and tackle was needed (such as raising the anchor on small ships).
windsail
A wide tube or funnel of canvas used to convey a stream of air into the lower compartments of a ship for ventilation.
wind deflector
A structure fitted on the bow of some containerships to decrease drag and improve fuel efficiency.
windward
In the direction that the wind is coming from. Contrast leeward.
wing
An extension on the side of a vessel, e.g. a bridge wing is an extension of the bridge to both sides, intended to allow bridge personnel a full view to aid in the manoeuvring of the ship.
wiper
The most junior rate among personnel who work in the engine room of a ship, responsible for cleaning the engine spaces and machinery and assisting the engineers as directed. A wiper is often serving an apprenticeship to become an oiler.
working up
Training on a warship to achieve the best possible effectiveness, usually after commissioning or a refit.
worm, parcel and serve

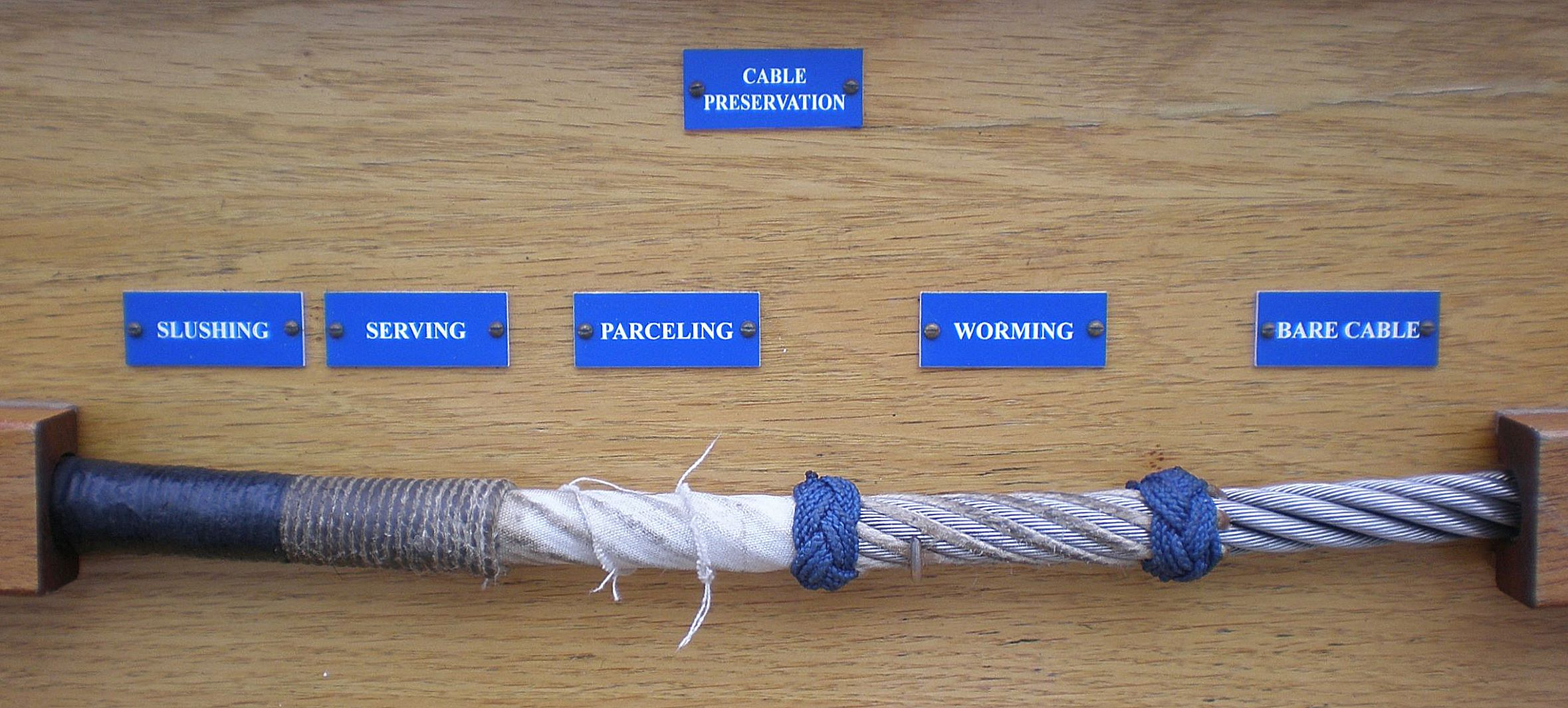
Example of the preservation of a cable, showing different sections serviced by various techniques, including worming, parcelling and serving

To apply a multilayered protection against chafing and deterioration to a section of line by laying yarns to fill in the cuntlines (worming), wrapping marline or other small stuff around it (serving), and stitching a covering of canvas over all (parcelling). It can be applied to the entire length of a line, such as a shroud, or selectively to specific parts of a line, such as over the spliced ends of a stay, where the chafe on the middle section of the stay precludes complete protection.
wrecking tug
Another name for a salvage tug.

Contents: Top	A	B	C	D	E	F	G	H	I	J	K	L	M	N	O	P	Q	R	S	T	U	V	W	X	Y	Z	See also	References

== X ==
xebec

1. A Mediterranean sailing ship, usually employed for trading, that is propelled by a combination of lateen sails and oars and characterized by a distinctive hull with a pronounced overhanging bow and stern; early xebecs had two masts and later ones had three.
2. A small, fast warship of the 16th to 19th centuries similar in design to a trading xebec and used almost exclusively in the Mediterranean Sea. This kind of xebec was slightly smaller than a contemporary frigate and mounted slightly fewer guns.
xebec-frigate
A European warship that appeared late in the history of the xebec. It was fully square-rigged but otherwise designed like an ordinary xebec.
XO
X.O.
An abbreviation of executive officer.

Contents: Top	A	B	C	D	E	F	G	H	I	J	K	L	M	N	O	P	Q	R	S	T	U	V	W	X	Y	Z	See also	References

== Y ==
yacht
Any boat or ship designed specifically for recreational use. The term includes sailing yachts, motor yachts, and steam yachts.
yard
1. A horizontal spar from which a square sail is suspended.
2. The spar on which a lugsail or Gunter sail is set.
3. A dockyard or shipyard.
yard name
The name initially given to a ship during its construction. The yard name may or may not be the same as the officially registered name, which is provided after completion of the vessel.
yard number
The number assigned to a ship built by a particular shipyard. Each shipyard typically numbers the ships that it has built in consecutive order. One use is to identify the ship before a name has been chosen.
yard tackle
Tackle used to raise boats.
yardarm
The very end of a yard. Often mistaken for the yard itself, which refers to the entire spar. As in to hang "from the yardarm" and the sun being "over the yardarm" (late enough to have a drink).
yar
(of a vessel, especially a sailing vessel) Quick, agile, and easy to steer, hand, and reef.
yarr
Acknowledgement of an order, or agreement. Also aye, aye.
yaw
A vessel's rotational motion about the vertical axis, causing the fore and aft ends to swing from side to side repetitively.
yawl
1. A fore-and-aft-rigged sailing vessel with two masts, main and mizzen, the mizzen stepped abaft the rudder post.
2. An un-decked boat, often beach-launched, worked under both oar and sail, and generally clinker-built. Used for fishing, serving ships in anchorages, salvage work, etc. Those from the northern parts of Britain tended to be double-ended.
yawl boat
A rowboat on davits at the stern of the boat.
yeoman
A U.S. Navy enlisted rating (YN) responsible for administrative duties.

Contents: Top	A	B	C	D	E	F	G	H	I	J	K	L	M	N	O	P	Q	R	S	T	U	V	W	X	Y	Z	See also	References

== Z ==
zebec
An alternative spelling of xebec.
zulu
A type of Scottish sailboat introduced in 1879, used for fishing. A zulu is carvel-built, with the vertical stem of a fifie and the steeply raked stern of a skaffie; two masts rigged with three sails (fore, mizzen, and jib); and a longer deck and shorter keel than previous Scottish fishing boats, allowing greater maneuverability. The term "zulu" came from the Zulu War, which the United Kingdom fought in 1879 at the time the zulu was introduced.

Contents: Top	A	B	C	D	E	F	G	H	I	J	K	L	M	N	O	P	Q	R	S	T	U	V	W	X	Y	Z	See also	References

== See also ==
- Articles that link to this glossary
- Glossary of nautical terms (A–L)
- List of ship directions
