= Seamanship =

Art, competence, and knowledge of operating a craft on water

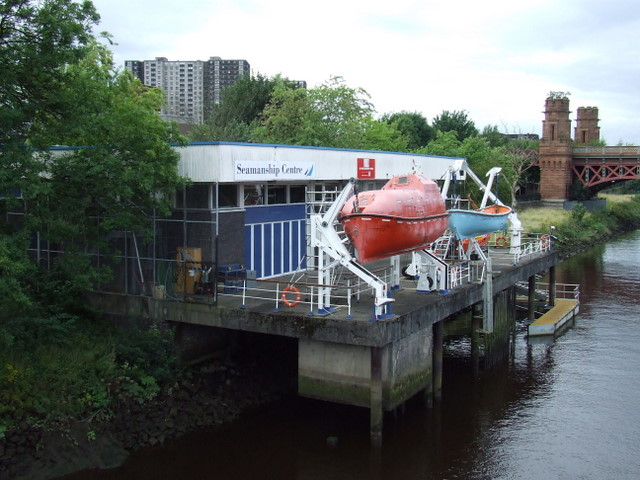
An example of a seamanship training establishment at the Glasgow College of Nautical Studies in the United Kingdom

Seamanship is the art, competence, and knowledge of operating a ship, boat or other craft on water. The Oxford Dictionary states that seamanship is "The skill, techniques, or practice of handling a ship or boat at sea."

It involves topics and development of specialised skills, including navigation and international maritime law and regulatory knowledge; weather, meteorology and forecasting; watchkeeping; ship-handling and small boat handling; operation of deck equipment, anchors and cables; ropework and line handling; communications; sailing; engines; execution of evolutions such as towing; cargo handling equipment, dangerous cargoes and cargo storage; dealing with emergencies; survival at sea and search and rescue; and fire fighting.

The degree of knowledge needed within these areas is dependent upon the nature of the work and the type of vessel employed by a seafarer.

== History ==
Before the 1600s, Seamanship skills were taught by hands-on instruction, after the 1600s, and 1700s, seamanship started being taught by literature.

== Ship knowledge, ship stability, and cargo operations ==
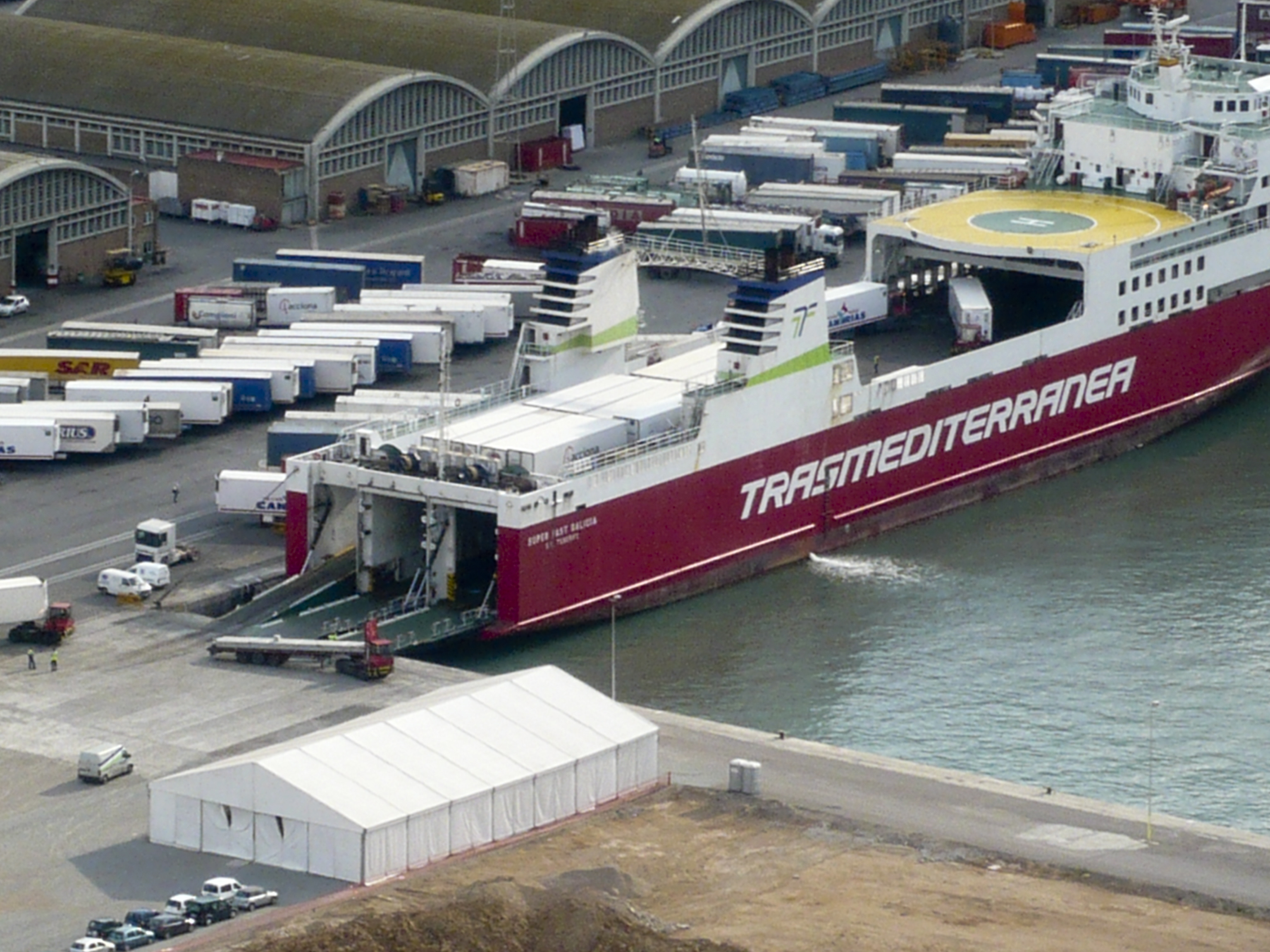
Seamanship involves loading cargo, calculating its effect on ship stability and ensuring it is correctly stowed and secured, such as on this car carrier.

Seamanship on a commercial level involves a knowledge of all the different ship types (such as bulk carriers, container ships, oil tankers, cruise ships, platform supply vessels, and others), including a basic knowledge of ship recognition, a basic understanding of nautical terms, ship structure and naval architecture and cargo operations, specific to the vessel the seafarer is working on. Some ship types will have specialist cargo equipment and tools; for example, a bulk carrier may have gantry cranes or grabs for cargo or a container ship may have container lashings. Cargoes should be properly stowed and secured to prevent shifting while at sea. Oil tankers and gas carriers can be somewhat complex due to the hazardous nature of their cargoes, and therefore a greater degree of seamanship may be necessary for some vessel types compared to others.

Seamanship involves paying close attention to the stability of the vessel at all times. This involves calculation of the vessel and the effects of its cargo at various stages of the voyage (on departure, at sea and on arrival in port) to allow for safe passage and prevent capsizing (where a vessel turns on to its side or is upside down). This includes familiarity and application of the Load Line Convention, where a vessel can only be safely loaded to its markings to ensure residual stability for the likely weather conditions. Seafarers should regularly inspect their vessel and ensure the hull is in good condition for navigation.

Seamanship skills apply to the safe use of various types of lifting gear, whether for cargo operations or for bringing on board stores, supplies, and provisions. These example Derricks, Union purchase arrangements, midship or aft cranes, heavy lifting gear, rigging other sheer legs etc. This should include knowledge of calculations of stresses and effects on stability.

== Navigation ==
Navigation is the art and science of safely and efficiently directing the movements of a vessel from one point to another. Piloting uses water depth and visible references, while dead reckoning uses courses and distances from the last known position. More than just finding a vessel's present location, safe navigation includes predicting future location, route planning, and collision avoidance. Nautical navigation in Western nations, like air navigation, is based on the nautical mile. Navigation also includes electronics such as GPS and Loran (Long Range Navigation). Celestial navigation involves taking sights with a sextant on the planets, moon, stars, and sun, and using the data, along with a nautical almanac and sight reduction tables, to determine position. Accurate time information is also needed. After nautical dusk, navigation at sea referencing the horizon is no longer possible, and after nautical dawn such navigation again becomes possible. Ice navigation involves navigating and operating a ship within sea ice conditions.

Along with general navigation, seamanship involves being able to respond to weather at sea. For example, the onset of heavy or rough weather may require an alternative passage plan (or weather routeing) for the ship, as well as the use of an alternative heading to keep the vessel from rolling (Heaving to). Additionally, heavy weather precautions onboard, such as lashing furniture in the accommodation or keeping crew off the deck, are considered good seamanship when navigating in heavy weather.

Navigation and seamanship also involve a working knowledge of correct marine communications and the Global Maritime Distress and Safety System.

Seamanship also involves recognition of and navigation with Buoys including IALA maritime buoyage such as Lateral marks, Cardinal marks, Safe water marks, Special marks and Isolated danger marks.

== Ship-handling and pilotage ==
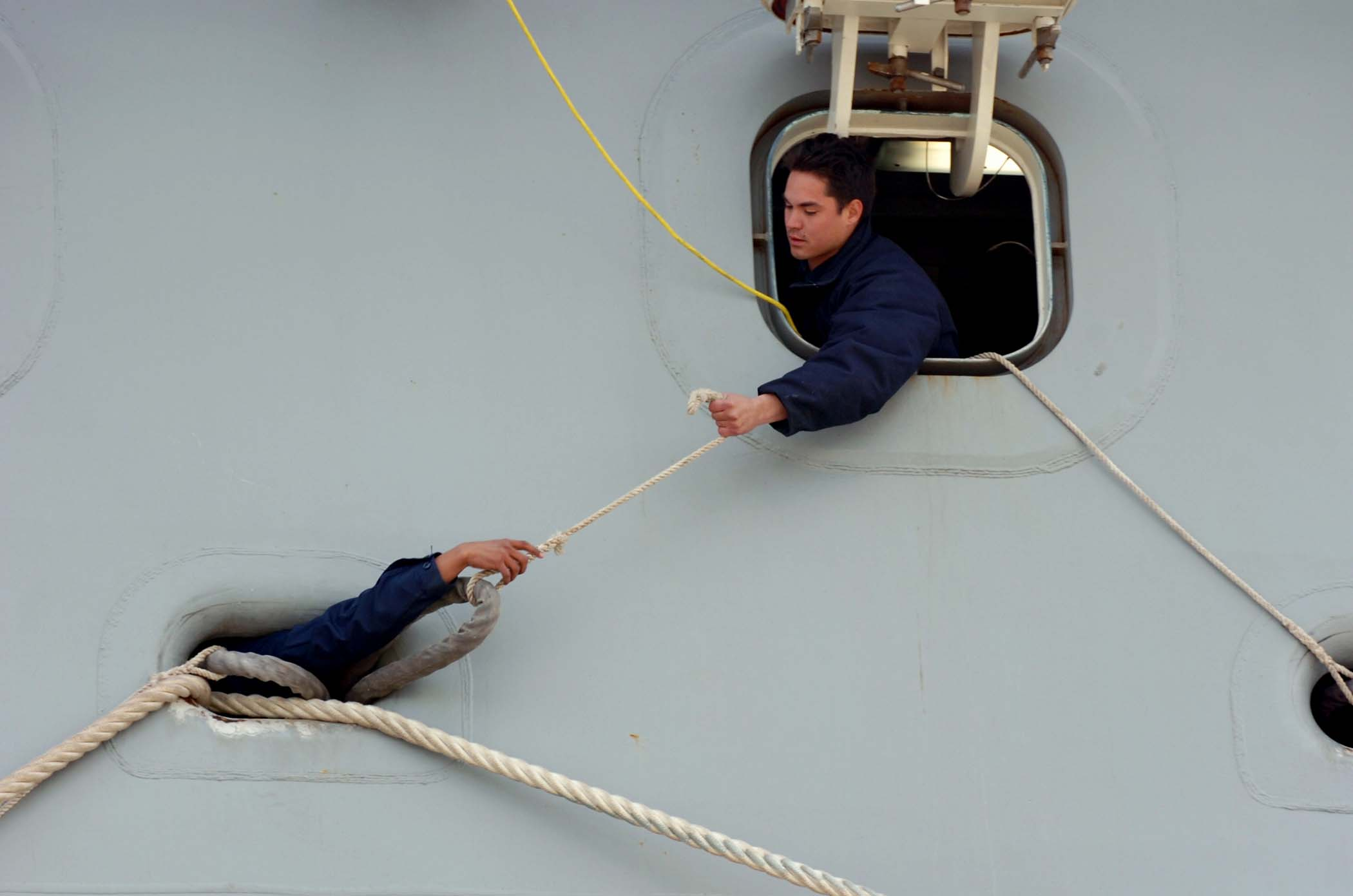
Sailors aboard USS San Antonio handle mooring lines.

A fundamental skill of professional seamanship is being able to manoeuvre a vessel safely with accuracy and precision both at sea and also in port and during pilotage. Unlike land based vehicles, a ship afloat is subject to the forces of the water in which it floats, as well as the resistance and effects of marine weather. A complicating factor is that the mass of a ship that has to be accounted for when stopping and starting, as the inertia of large vessels may take large distances to stop and therefore ship-handlers must be aware of basic Hydrodynamics and the charted area, including the depth of water in which their ship is navigating.

Ship-handling in coastal areas may involve arriving and departing a berth, anchorage, or buoy, maneuvering in confined channels and harbours, and in proximity to other ships, whilst at all times navigating safely. Seamanship also involves safe navigation in restricted waterways, for example, in river and canal transits, e.g., along the Suez canal. Crew should be able to keep the vessel from collisions, moor the vessel during canal lockgate operations, and also respond to local currents and river conditions while on passage. Two other types of operations, berthing alongside another ship (usually for Ship-to-ship cargo transfer and replenishment at sea, are occasionally included in ship-handling seamanship for some vessel types. In addition to being fully conversant with the principles of ship-handling, a good shiphandler or pilot will have developed their sense of 'situational awareness' to a point well beyond that of an ordinary member of a ship's crew; their reactions will appear instinctive, positive, and always safe.

A key ability for a ship-handler with good seamanship is to possess an understanding of how wind, tide, and swell influence vessel movement, along with passing vessels and the shape of the nearby seabed (the interaction effect). These must also be combined with an understanding of a specific vessel's performance, including its propulsion and stopping distance, to allow safe handling. Fundamental to low-speed maneuvering of most vessel types is an understanding of the configuration and handedness of the propeller(s). An effect known as propeller walk will kick the stern of the vessel to port or starboard, depending on the configuration and the type of propeller, when large variations in propeller rotation speed or changes in propeller rotation direction take place. (In single-screw vessels where the rotation of the propeller is reversed on an astern bell, a standard was established that the propeller would turn clockwise when viewed from astern. This would mean that the propeller would turn counterclockwise when going astern, and the stern would walk to port. This aided docking operations, where "port side to" was preferred; the vessel would be brought to the dock with a small bow-in angle, and backing would flatten the angle, slow or stop the vessel, and walk it alongside. An exception to this is vessels that use a controllable-pitch propeller, where the pitch, not the direction of rotation, is reversed to go astern. These propellers rotate counterclockwise at all times, and so the "walk" is "normal".

Other variations on propulsion include what are known as bucket rudders and Kort Nozzles, where instead of a conventional rudder, a pair of dish-shaped rudders, one on either side of the propeller, can be swivelled vertically to direct the propeller thrust through 360 degrees. Thus, to put the vessel into astern mode, the rudder can be rotated through 180 degrees without altering the speed and direction of the engine. Since with the conventional propeller or rudder configuration, the propeller is designed to operate at maximum efficiency when going ahead, it produces far less thrust when going astern. But with the Kort Nozzle, the ahead and astern thrust is the same. Other advantages of the nozzle are that the ship can be steered astern, which a conventional rudder cannot, and that it can be brought to a standstill under full control by switching between ahead and astern modes, giving complete control over speed.

=== Mooring and anchoring ===
Seamanship applies to general Mooring practices and anchoring (anchors are a device used to secure a vessel to the bed of a body of water to prevent the craft from drifting) and established marine procedures for anchoring (anchorwork). This also includes the use of drogues as applicable.

Anchor work includes understanding and awareness of anchor types, anchor marks, cable, and shackles. It includes learning established procedures for securing anchors and cable, use of windlasses, how to prepare the anchors/clearing away anchors for letting go, letting-go (dropping) the anchor, keeping an anchor watch, clearing a foul Hawse, weighing anchor and securing anchors for sea.

=== Pilotage ===
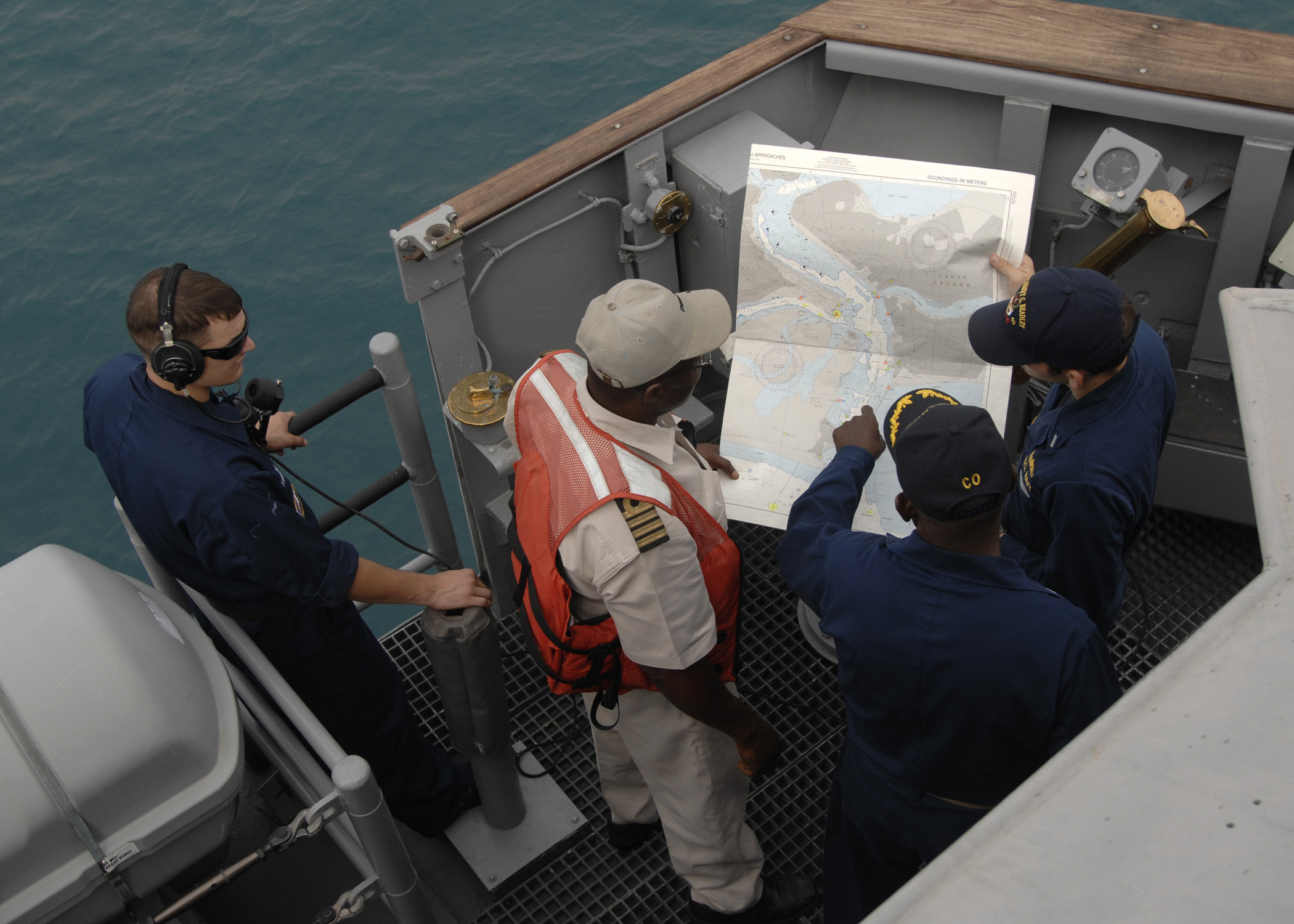
Navigation on a US naval vessel in Nigerian waters with a local pilot.

Most commercial vessels in excess of size limits determined by local authorities are handled in confined areas by a maritime (or marine) pilot. Marine pilots are seafarers with extensive seafaring experience and are usually qualified master mariners who have been trained as expert ship-handlers. These pilots should be conversant with all types of vessels in their local waters and possess a good knowledge of the different propulsion systems, as well as handling ships of all sizes in all weather and tidal conditions. They are also experts in the geographical areas they work. In most countries, the pilot takes over the 'conduct' of the navigation from the ship master. This means that the master and crew should adhere to the pilot's orders in respect of the safe navigation of the vessel when in a compulsory pilotage area. However, the master may, with good cause, resume 'conduct' of the vessel's navigation, but this is not done lightly. In some countries and areas (e.g., the United Kingdom and the United States of America), the pilot's role is as an advisor. However, in practice, they are likely to have the vessel's conduct, especially on larger ships, assisted by tugboats. In some places, specifically in the Panama Canal, a pilot assumes command of a vessel and is not classed as "an advisor". Other instances may include crossing the sill of a drydock or any port in Russia (or ex-Soviet States). This distinction is important because when a pilot is in command, the master cannot take any action and is limited to advising the pilot on any circumstance that he considers dangerous.

== Regulatory knowledge ==
A working knowledge of the relevant rules and regulations, including those of the International Maritime Organization, is good seamanship as it ensures compliance with international, flag, and port State requirements. For example, the International Regulations for Preventing Collisions at Sea are the principal international rules for navigation between vessels at sea. Rule 2 sets out responsibility for safe navigation by stating

Nothing in these Rules shall exonerate any vessel or the owner, master, or crew thereof, from the consequences of any neglect to comply with these Rules or of the neglect of any precaution, which may be required by the ordinary practice of seamen, or by the special circumstances of the case.

The ordinary practice of seamen is seen as equivalent wording for seamanship. Other accepted practices of seamanship relating to the COLREGs include maintaining a proper look-out (Rule 5), proceeding at a safe speed (Rule 6) and taking correct actions to avoid collision (Rule 8).

== Maintenance and dry-docking ==
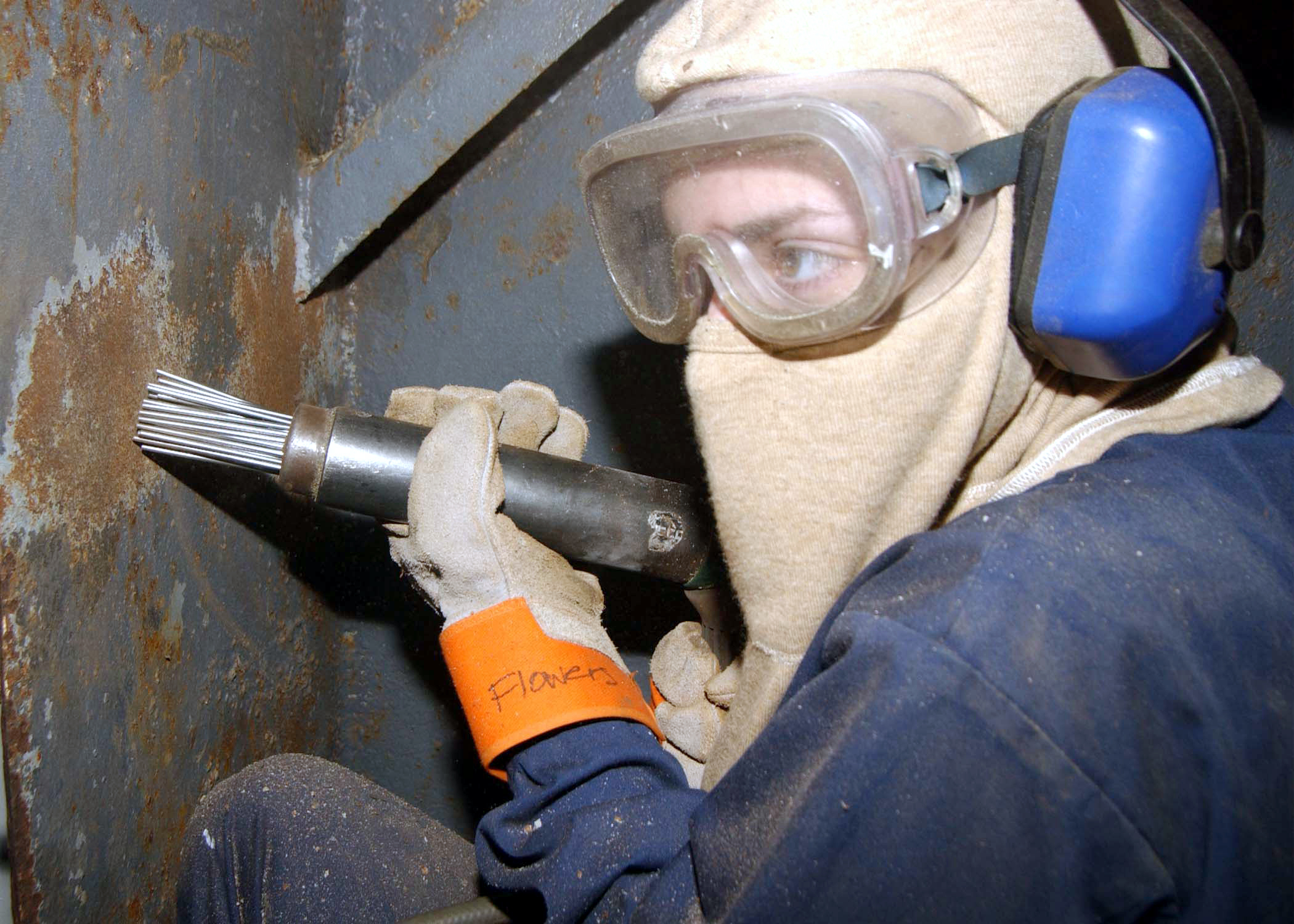
Preparation for painting on a ship with a needle gun to remove previous paint layers

Seamanship involves the correct and adequate maintenance of the ship’s structure and equipment to keep the vessel seaworthy. This involves knowledge of tasks such as painting, greasing, and renewing ropes, wires, and other equipment. Seamanship also involves a working knowledge of the relevant wires, ropes, chains, shackles, and slings onboard. This includes mooring ropes used to keep the vessel secure in port. Seamanship on some vessel types may involve being able to maintain and use marine cranes and lifting equipment if fitted on a ship. Larger ship types usually have a crane for cargo operations and to bring on board stores, provisions, and supplies for the crew.

Seamanship knowledge and experience are an integral part of Dry-docking. This includes careful planning (of all jobs, tasks, and repairs), adequate preparations (e.g., painting), dry-dock calculations (primarily stability and upthrust), safety within the dry-dock, and checks upon departure (e.g., plugs returned and sealed).

Lifeboat, rescue boat, and survival craft maintenance and operation are an essential part of seamanship. This involves being able to operate survival craft in emergencies, but also to be able to maintain them effectively to operate in accordance with SOLAS requirements. The STCW Convention requires that modern seafarers be familiar with emergency operations, including fire fighting. Personnel at sea are required to undertake firefighting training at shore-based training establishments. It is a statutory requirement and considered good seamanship to regularly practice (drill) these skills when at sea. Other emergency skills include the Man overboard rescue turn.

== Traditional seamanship skills ==
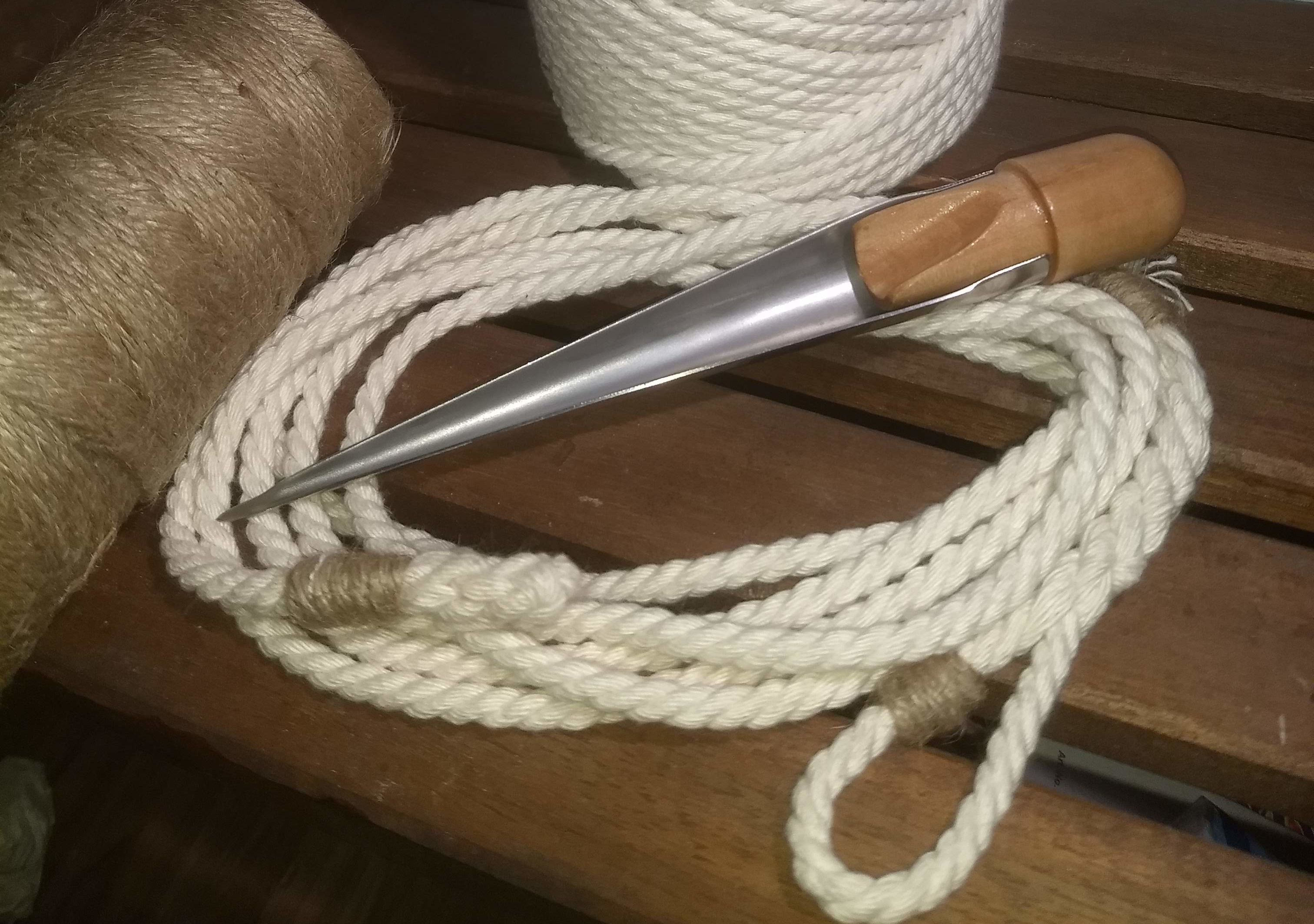
A Swedish fid, used ropework techniques and a traditional aspect of seamanship.

Historic or traditional seamanship skills are less frequently used on modern commercial ships. However, they are usually still practiced in training colleges and used on smaller ships, fishing vessels, and leisure craft. These include ropework (included tying knots, rope splicing, wire splicing, lashings and whippings), as well as rigging of a stage, rigging of a bosuns ladder, canvas work, use of chain blocks and pulleys, etc. Other traditional practices apply to life onboard, such as forms of address to the Captain and in use of marine flag, including courtesies and flag signalling. Specifically, these include items such as flag signalling terms, single and double letter meanings according to the International Code of Signals, flag maintenance, the use of ensigns, and also Morse code procedure and practice.

In the days of sailing ships, an able seaman was expected to be able to "hand, and reef, and steer" and to "know the ropes", the basic knowledge on the identity of the many ropes with different functions. This latter knowledge was essential for both safety and efficient working - those without it would be dismissed or derated at the first opportunity.

Training is more formal in the merchant navy and naval forces, but still covers the basics of traditional seamanship. Smaller vessel types may have traditional seamanship methods unique to them, for example, turtling on dinghies and small sailing boats.

Boatwork is a traditional seamanship skill. On commercial ships, this is usually limited to rescue boats and lifeboats, however, yachts and other vessels such as passenger ships may have tenders and small boats for transporting people between ship/shore. Boatwork includes knowledge and operation of different types of boats, launching procedures, recovery of boats (in normal and in heavy weather conditions), how to beach a boat if possible, the use of oars or sails, as well as basic sail theory, sail terminology, and markings on sails.

One other aspect of traditional good seamanship is housekeeping on the vessel. This involves correct stowage of stores, supplies, crew personal effects, etc. It also involves keeping the decks, engine room and accommodation clean and free of debris or spills. This reduces the chances of fire at sea and reduces the chance of injury, e.g., due to slips, trips, and falls.

== Progression in seamanship ==
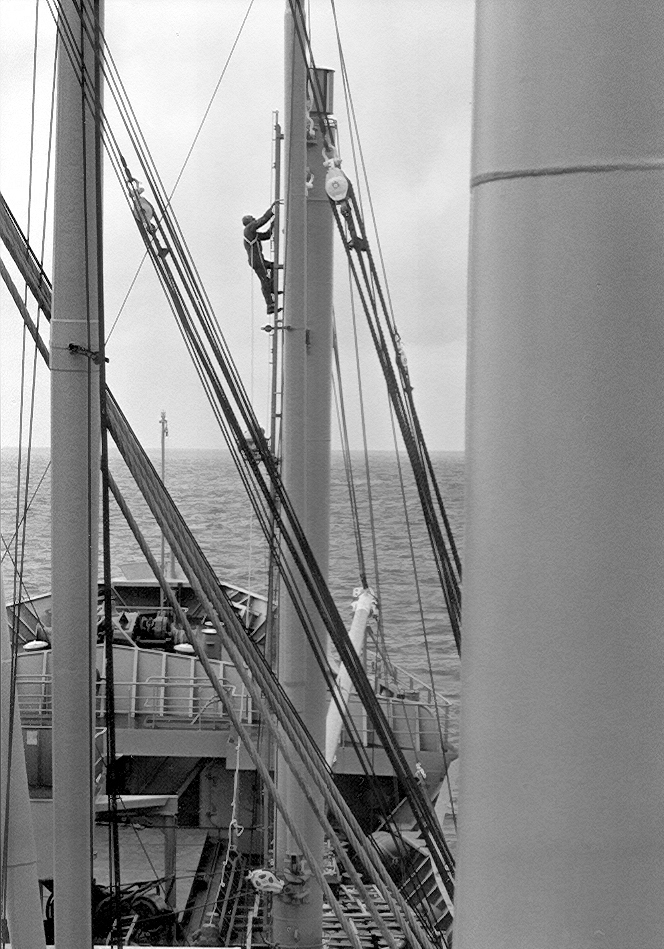
An able seaman climbs a kingpost to perform maintenance aboard a general cargo ship or freighter.

Officers and Masters must pass formal examinations to demonstrate their knowledge at various levels, in accordance with national laws and the STCW Convention. These examinations have a progression based on the size and complexity of the ship, including its sailing area, as well as by rank. Globally, most seafarers are required to possess a basic seamanship certificate. In the U.S., the progression begins with what is known as "the six pack", a license that allows fishing guides to operate with up to six passengers. In the United Kingdom, all seafarers, both deck officers and crew, must complete an Efficient Deck Hand (EDH Course) at an approved training provider under direction of the UK Merchant Navy Training Board.

The crew of a large ship will typically be organized into "divisions" or "departments", each with its own specialty. For example, the deck department is responsible for navigation, ship handling, and general maintenance, while the engineering division is responsible for propulsion and other mechanical systems. Crew members start on the most basic duties, and as they gain experience and expertise, they advance within their area. Crew who have gained proficiency become "able seamen", "petty officers", "rated", or "mates", depending on the ship type and organisation.

On smaller commercial craft, there is little or no specialisation. The deck crew performs all boat-handling functions. The officers of the ship are responsible for navigation, communication, and watch supervision.

== See also ==
- United States Merchant Marine Academy

== Sources ==
- Admiralty Manual of Seamanship, ISBN 0-11-772696-6.
- Bowditch's American Practical Navigator
- Knight's Modern Seamanship Wiley. p. ix-x. ISBN 9780471289487.
- Naval Shiphandler's Guide / James Alden Barber — Naval Institute Press, 2005 — ISBN 1-55750-435-0.
- Royal Navy (Book of Reference) BR67.
- Seamanship: A Guide for Divers / Kris Pedder, BSAC, ISBN 0-9538919-7-6.
- Seamanship Techniques Butterworth-Heinemann. p. 25-57. ISBN 978-0750622035.
- 21st Century Seamanship, Witherby Publishing Group, 2015, ISBN 1-85609632-7.
