= Day beacon =

Unlighted nautical sea mark

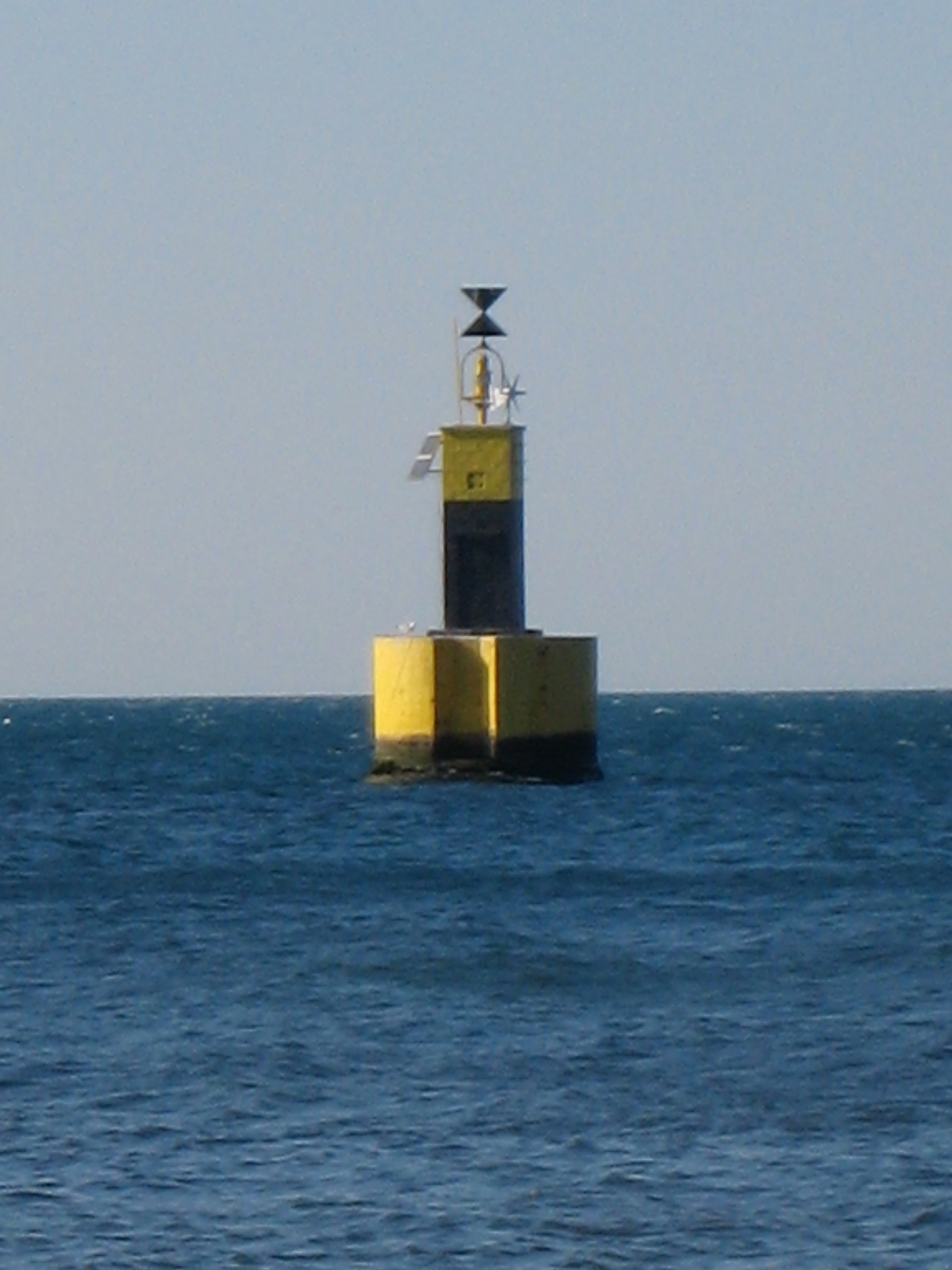
A day beacon off Punta Grossa in the Gulf of Trieste, marking the west side of a hazard

A day beacon (sometimes daybeacon) is an unlighted nautical sea mark. A daymark is a signboard attached to it that presents navigational information in a standard shape (square, triangle, rectangle, rhombus) and color. Day beacons typically mark channels whose key points are marked by lighted buoys. They may also mark smaller navigable routes in their entirety. They are the most common navigation aid in shallow water, as they are relatively inexpensive to install and maintain. Navigation around them is similar to that around other navigation aids.

== Identification ==
=== Lateral marking ===
For historical reasons, there are two systems for lateral day beacons. When proceeding from open water towards harbor, marks with cylindrical topmarks or square dayboards are kept to port in both regions, but colors and numbers are reversed.

Differences between the two IALA regions
IALA Region	Area covered, very roughly	Colors when approaching harbors from seaward	Numbers	Shape
Region A	Europe, Africa, most of Asia, Australia	Lefthand side marks are red Right: green	Left: even numbers Right: odd numbers	Left: cylindrical topmarks, square dayboards, can buoys Right: conical topmarks, triangular dayboards, nun buoys
Region B	N&S America, Japan, Philippines, Eastern Pacific	Left: green Right: red	Left: odd Right: even	The same

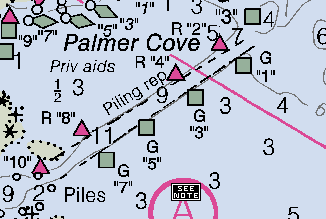
This channel is designated by day beacons, though beacons "6" and "9" are omitted. Simple, unnumbered piles are used instead of them.

When lateral beacons are paired, vessels should pass between the pairing. However, beacons are also frequently placed individually. Generally, single lateral beacons are at the inside corner of a turn. Interior or exterior placement can be determined based upon the passing side (port or starboard) dictated by beacon designation. However, a current chart should always be consulted for all but the shallowest-draft vessels, as channel conditions are rarely ideal.

=== Cardinal marking ===
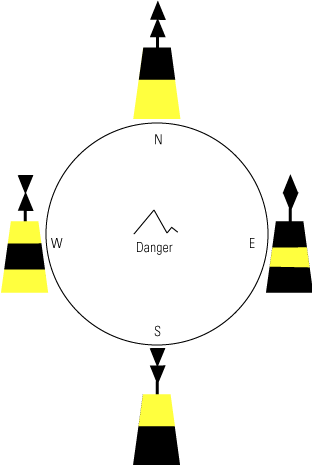
Sketch of cardinal beacons placed around an obstruction

Cardinal day beacons are used to indicate the position of a hazard and the direction of safe water as a cardinal direction (north, east, south or west) relative to the mark. This makes them meaningful regardless of the direction or position of the approaching vessel, in contrast to the lateral mark system.

A cardinal day beacon indicates one of the four compass directions by:

- the direction of its two conical top-marks, which can both point up, indicating north; down, indicating south; towards each other, indicating west; or away from each other, indicating east
- its distinctive pattern of black and yellow stripes, which follows the orientation of the cones – the black stripe is in the position pointed to by the cones (e.g. at the top for a north cardinal, in the middle for a west cardinal)

== See also ==
- Bowditch's American Practical Navigator
- Foghorn
- Isolated danger mark
- Lighthouse
- Lightvessel
- Safe water mark
- Special mark
