= Navigational hazard =

Situation causing risk to air or water navigation

A navigational hazard or hazard to navigation has been defined in various, slightly different, ways:

- An obstruction, usually sunken, that presents sufficient danger to navigation so as to require expeditious, affirmative action such as marking, removal, or redefinition of a designated waterway to provide for navigational safety.
- Any obstacle encountered by a vessel in route posing risk or danger to the vessel, its contents or the environment.
- An obstruction determined to have a substantial adverse effect on the safety and efficient utilization of the navigable airspace.

== Types ==
Maritime hazards to navigation and airspace hazards to navigation.

=== Hazards to marine navigation ===
Hazards may be permanent, or temporary, including seasonal, and fixed or mobile,

- Fog is temporary, but may occur frequently in some areas and seasons
- Icebergs are mobile and temporary, and also seasonal in some areas
- Some river channels are variable
- Some underwater obstructions are unidentified, others may be known.
- Both shipwrecks with a fixed position and floating derelicts and other flotsam can be hazards
- Seabed obstructions
- Mined international waterways

The risk associated with a hazard is aggravated when the position is uncertain, or the hazard is unmarked or obscured by poor visibility.

=== Consequences ===
- Marine accidents can occur, which can cause loss of life and vessels, or delays of shipping, unreliable transport of people and goods, and environmental damage.

=== Hazards to airspace navigation ===
- Weather conditions such as high winds, icing, thunderstorms, wind shear and clear air turbulence, low visibility.
- Physical obstructions such as tall buildings, radio masts, cranes, wires, mountains, cliffs, power lines.
- Volcanic ash.
- Smoke and convection from wildfires.
- Human factors, such as fatigue, poor navigation, inattention, bad communication and aircrew error.
- Entering restricted airspace without proper authorisationand warning.
- Wildlife such as birds can be a hazard, particularly during takeoff and landing.
- Dysfunctional navigation systems such as radio and radar beacons, lights, etc.

== Conditions determining a hazard ==
When deciding whether a static hazard will be marked,the following factors may be considered:

- Location of the obstruction relative to the navigable channel and relative to other hazards
- Difficulty of navigation near the obstruction
- Depth of water over the hazard, and how much it is likely to vary
- Type of vessel traffic in the vicinity of the hazard, particularly draft, but also amount of traffic
- Physical characteristics of the hazard
- Probability that the hazard may move
- Weather conditions that are likely in the vicinity
- How long the hazard has existed in that location, and any history of accidents involving the hazard, and
- Whether the object is considered a hazard in terms of alternative legislation

== Marking of navigational hazards ==
An aid to navigation (ATON) is any device external to a vessel or aircraft specifically intended to assist navigators in determining their position or safe course, or to warn them of dangers or obstructions to navigation.

- Lighthouse – Structure designed to emit light to aid navigation
- Lightship – Ship that functions as a lighthouse
- Navigational buoy – Moored floating object intended to aid navigation
  - Emergency wreck buoy – Marker buoy warning of a wreck
  - Isolated danger mark – Sea mark indicating a danger spot
  - Safe water mark – Type of sea mark
  - Cardinal mark – Sea mark indicating where safe water is near to a hazard
  - Bell buoy – Audible navigational warning used in low visibility
- Radar beacon – Transmitter-receiver associated with a fixed navigational mark
- Foghorn – Device using sound to warn shipping in fog
- Notice to mariners – Advisory document updating navigational safety information
- Nautical chart – Topographic map of a maritime area and adjacent coastal regions

== Navigational warnings ==
A navigational warning is information published or broadcast providing information on the status of one or more navigational hazards.
