= Emergency wreck buoy =

Marker buoy warning of a wreck

Light pattern

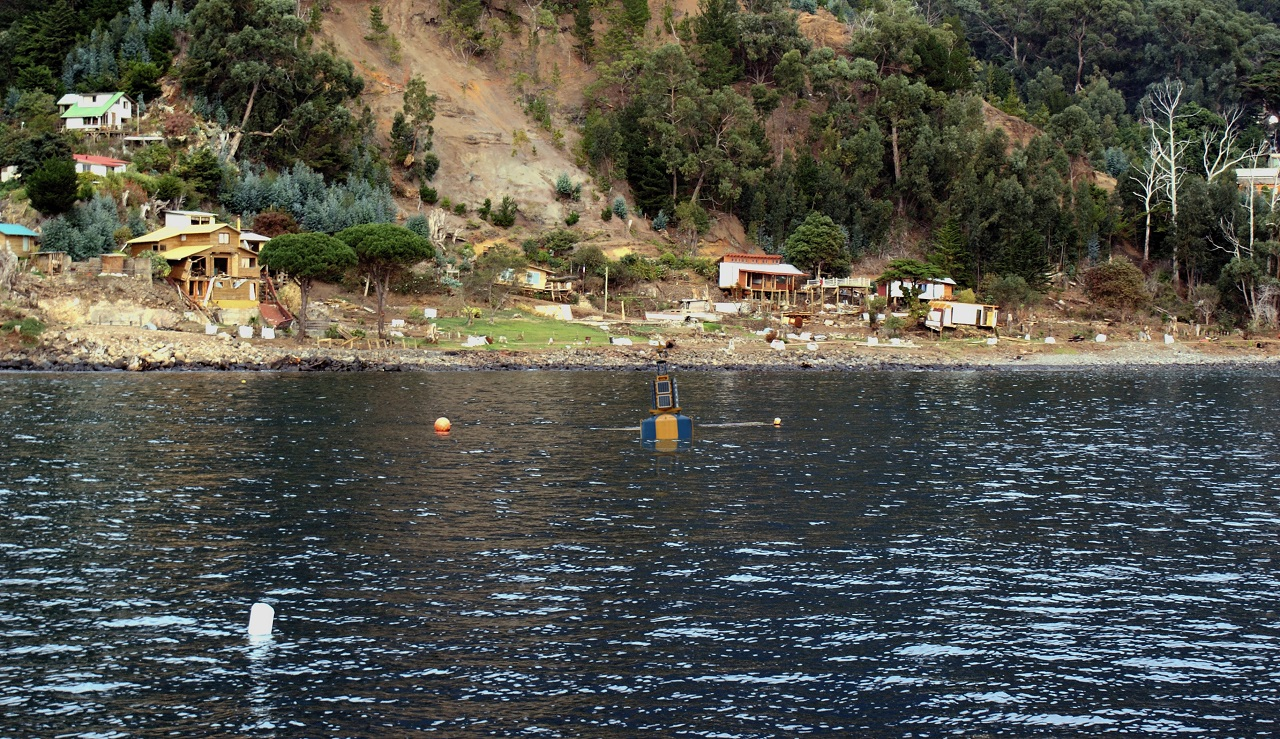
Buoy deployed

Emergency Wreck Buoy

An Emergency wreck buoy is used to warn of a new wreck which has not yet been listed in maritime documents. The buoy is expected to be deployed for the first 24-72 hours after the wreck occurs. After that time more permanent buoyage (such as isolated danger marks or cardinal marks) should be deployed and charts updated.

The buoy is designed to "provide a clear and unambiguous" mark of a new and uncharted danger.

Emergency wreck marks are recognisable by the following characteristics:

- Pillar or spar shape.
- Colour pattern of 6 to 7 alternating blue and yellow vertical stripes of equal widths.
- If a topmark is attached, it is a yellow "+" (also known as Saint George's Cross) shape.
- Always having a light fitted which repeats an occulting ("Oc") alternating ("Al") light characteristic of the following pattern, abbreviated as "OcAlBY":
  - Blue ("B") light emitted for 1 second.
  - Eclipse (duration of darkness) of 500 milliseconds.
  - Yellow ("Y") light emitted for 1 second.
  - Eclipse (duration of darkness) of 500 milliseconds.

An emergency wreck mark may also have the word "WRECK" painted on it. No other navigation mark uses the colour blue or uses blue light.

The International Association of Marine Aids to Navigation and Lighthouse Authorities (IALA) defined the buoy in response to the sinking of the MV Tricolor and the subsequent collisions with the wreck by the Dutch vessel Nicola and Turkish-registered fuel carrier Vicky.

== See also ==
- Navigation
- Lateral mark
- Cardinal mark
- Safe water mark
- Special mark
- Isolated danger mark
- Light characteristic
