= John Bury (captain) =

Captain John Bury (28 July 1915 – 17 October 2006) was a master mariner and Elder Brother of Trinity House. He was involved in the adoption of a standardised buoyage system internationally.

Bury was born in Moose Jaw, Saskatchewan. His parents were Welsh immigrants who had taken up farming on the Canadian prairie, but later returned to Wales.

Bury took up a maritime career in 1931, becoming an apprentice on the Anchor Line. He joined the New Zealand Shipping Company in 1940 and served in the Merchant navy in World War II. He was promoted within the company to command its ships, before being elected to Trinity House.

Mutually inconsistent buoyage systems had proliferated in the 19th and early 20th centuries, leading to many accidents at sea. As chairman of the IALA Buoyage Committee, Bury oversaw the introduction in the 1970s of a standardised maritime buoyage systems, involving cardinal marks painted yellow and black with topmarks and lights to indicate to mariners the direction of maritime dangers, and lateral marks painted red or green to indicate whether the mark was to be passed on the port or starboard. The new standardised system was ratified in 1980, and the buoyage system remains in international use.

== External source ==
- Obituary, The Times, 8 December 2006
