= Region B =

Region B may refer to:

- Region B of the IALA Maritime Buoyage System
- Region B of the Blu-ray disc storage system
