= Sea mark =

Maritime navigation aid

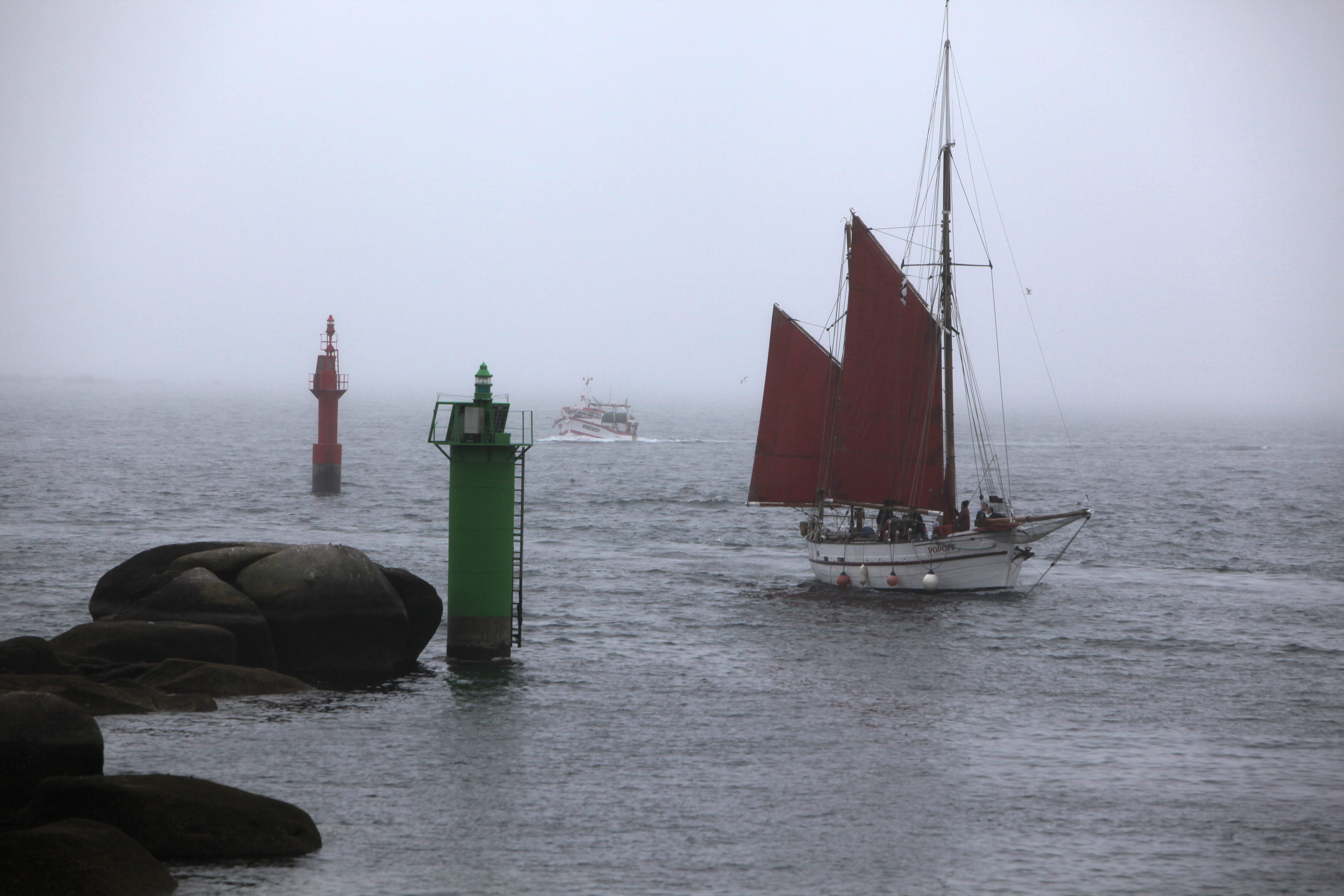
The Ketch Popoff, approaching Concarneau harbour and passing between the sea mark buoys of the entrance, while an approaching trawler in the background sails around the red buoy

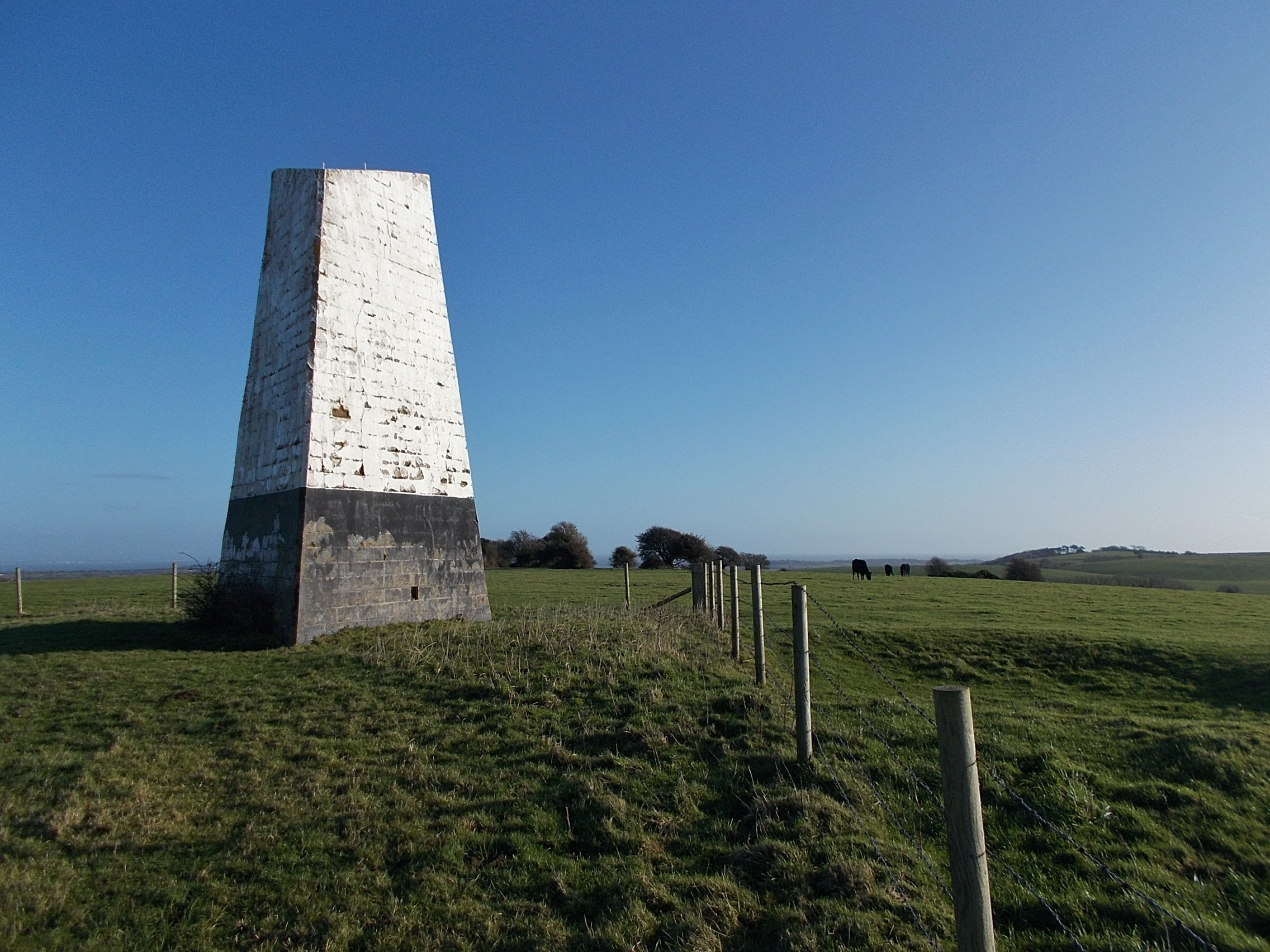
Inland sea mark on Ashey Down, Isle of Wight, built in 1735 and now a historical monument

A sea mark, also seamark and navigation mark, is a form of aid to navigation and pilotage that identifies the approximate position of a maritime channel, hazard, or administrative area to allow boats, ships, and seaplanes to navigate safely.

There are three types of sea mark: beacons fixed to the seabed or on shore, towers (sometimes rock cairns) built on the shore or on a submerged rock/object (especially in calmer waters), and buoys (consisting of a floating object that is usually anchored to a specific location on the bottom of the sea or to a submerged object).

Sea marks are used to indicate channels, dangerous rocks or shoals, mooring positions, areas of speed limits, traffic separation schemes, submerged shipwrecks, and for a variety of other navigational purposes. Some are only intended to be visible in daylight (daymarks), others have some combination of lights, reflectors, fog bells, foghorns, whistles and radar reflectors to make them usable at night and in conditions of reduced visibility.

Marks are shown on nautical charts, using symbols that indicate their colour, shape and light characteristic, and are usually identified by name or number.

In a wider sense the phrase "sea mark" is often understood to include all types of landmarks, structures and devices that can be used to provide warning and guiding signs to mariners. Thus a sea mark can be and often is located on dry land. Examples of land-based sea marks are various signal lights and leading marks. The latter are mainly used to indicate the centerline of a fairway in narrow passages. Sea marks may also on occasion be used to help mark the boundaries of defensive sea minefields, or the safe lanes through same, especially during wartime.

== Definitions ==
The International Association of Lighthouse Authorities defines one system of marks specifying the shapes, colours and characteristic lights of buoys depending on their purpose, the IALA Maritime Buoyage System. For historical reasons, there are two regions of lateral marks in use:

- IALA Region B in the Americas, the Philippines, South Korea and Japan
- IALA Region A everywhere else.

The two regions differ principally in the colours used to denote the two sides of a channel. When approaching a harbour from seaward, Region A places conical green marks to starboard and cylindrical red ones to port. In Region B these are replaced with conical red marks to starboard and cylindrical green ones to port. This can be remembered (for Region B) with the mnemonic "Red, right, return". Another Region B mnemonic, which also helps with buoy numbering is "Even Red Left Port" (as in Eric the Red) - Even Numbered buoys are red, on your left (port) side leaving port. In any case, since in many harbours it is not always apparent which direction is seaward, buoys should be used in connection with the appropriate nautical chart. Additionally, since marks may be off station due to collision with ships, storms or other factors, they should be used with caution and not relied on solely for navigation. The two regions are often referred to as two systems, which was the original intent. In 1980 it was decided however to combine these systems and distinguish between regions.

== Image gallery ==
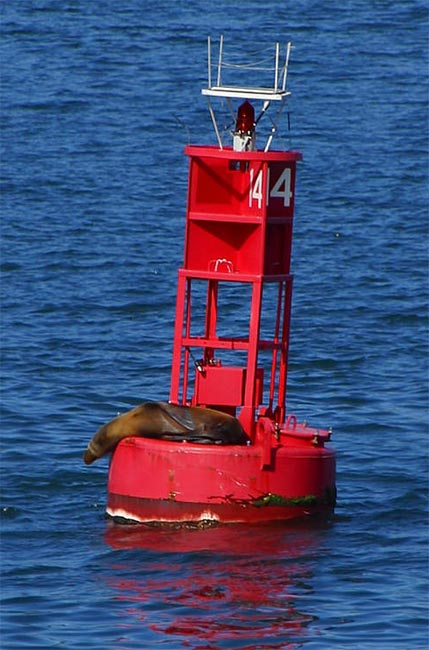
Red buoy in San Diego Harbor, with a light, number, and radar corner reflectors.

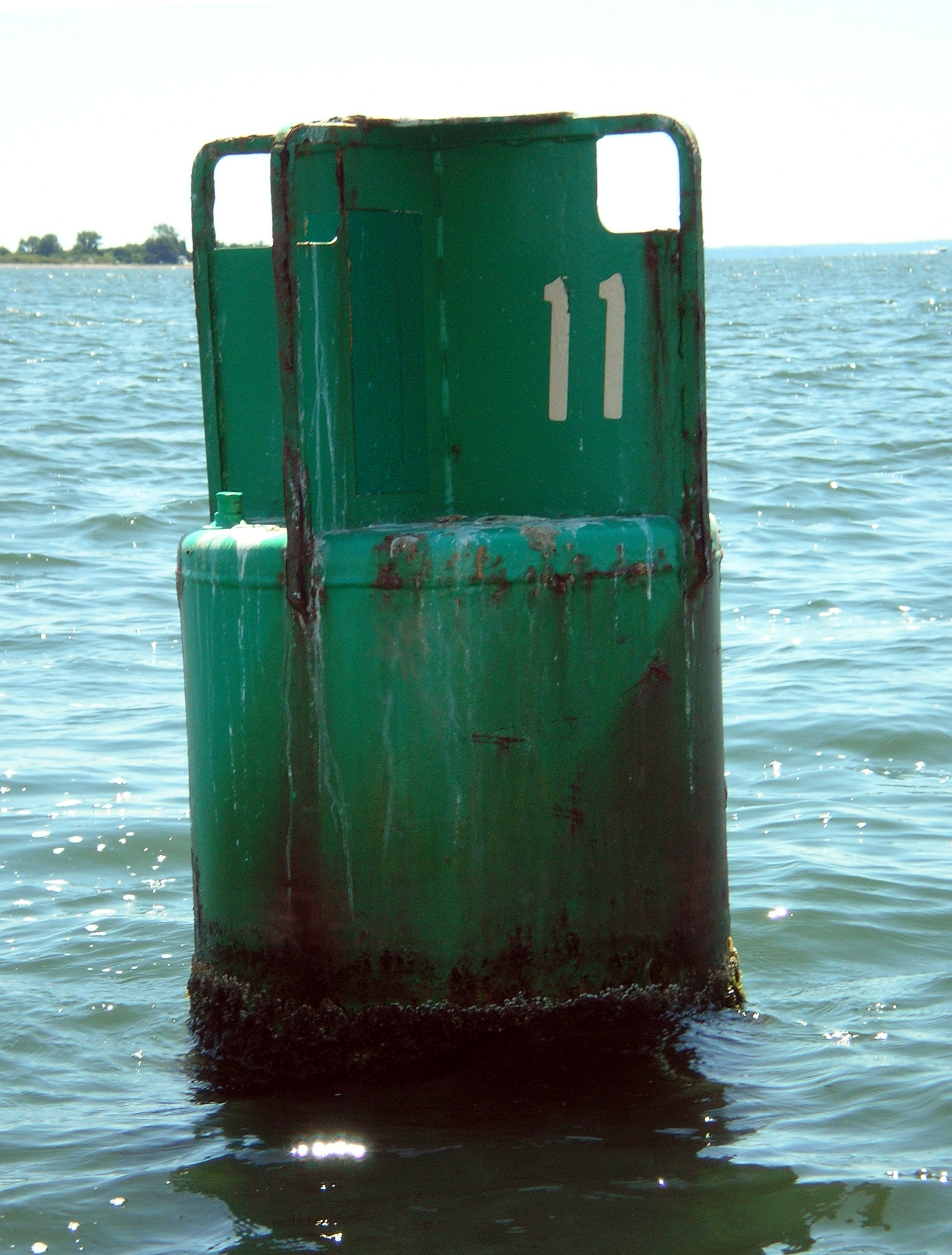
Green can #11 near the mouth of the Saugatuck River.

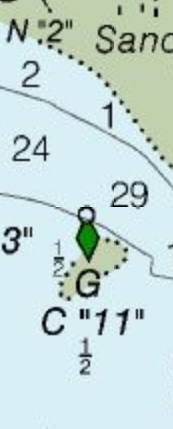
Same green can #11, on a NOAA nautical chart.

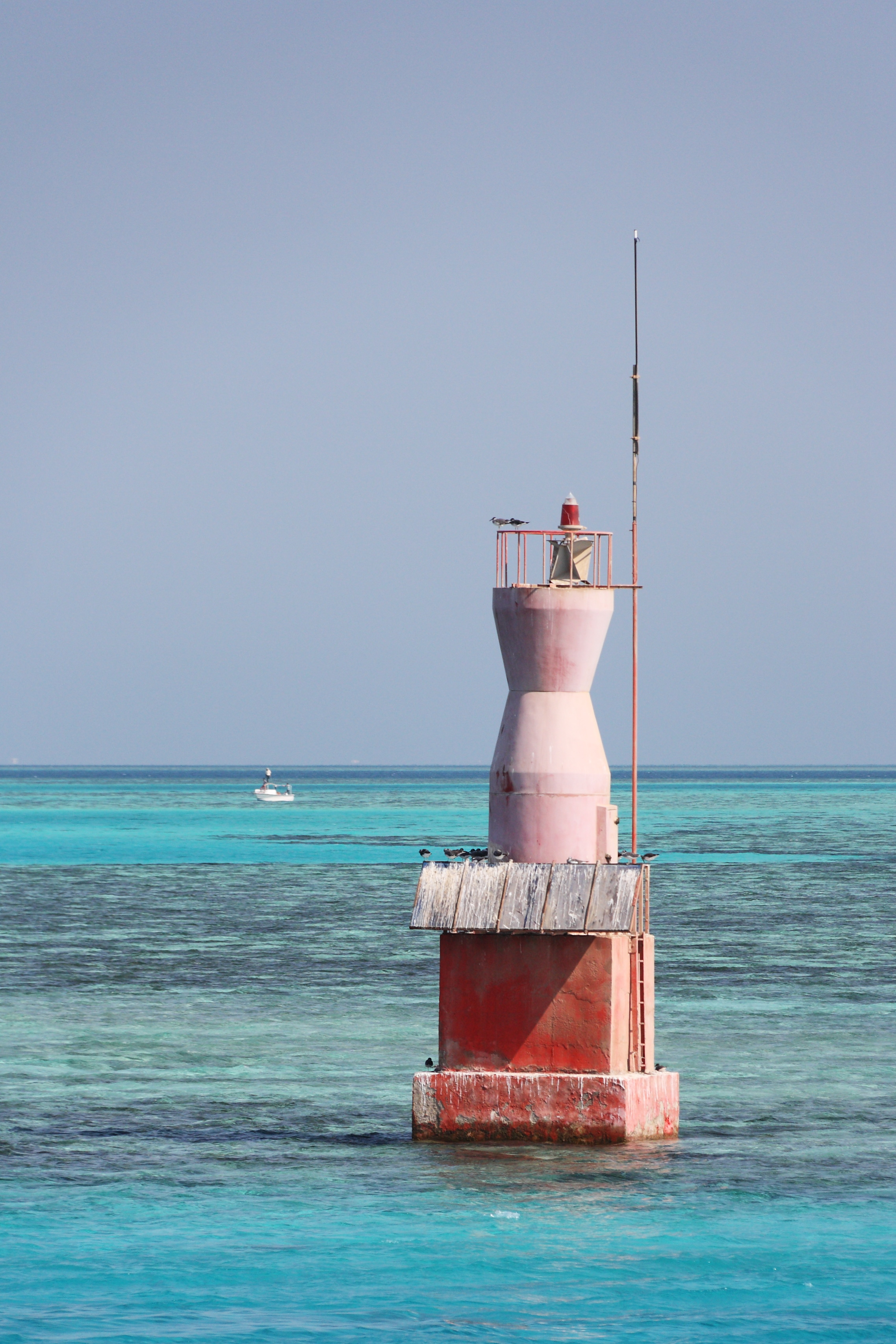
Sea mark near Hurghada, Egypt

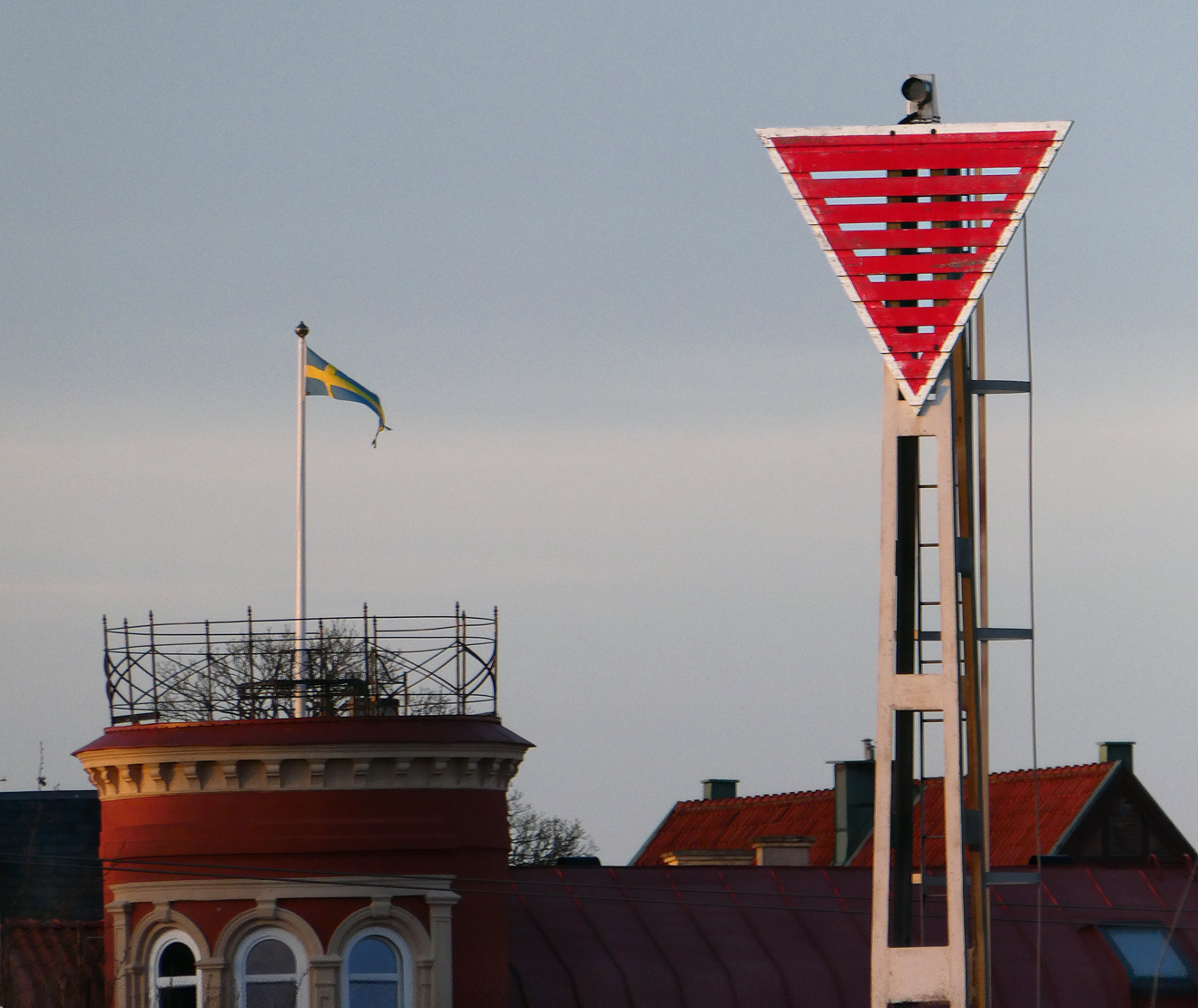
Triangular daymark in the marina of Ystad 2021.

== See also ==
=== Mark types ===
- Cardinal mark
- Emergency wreck buoy
- Isolated danger mark
- Lateral mark
- Leading lights
- Safe water mark
- Special mark

=== Other ===
- ATON
- Buoy
- Daymark
- Landmark
- Lighthouse
- Lightvessel
- Racon
