= IALA (disambiguation) =

IALA can stand for:

- International Association of Lighthouse Authorities (International Association of Marine Aids to Navigation and Lighthouse Authorities)
- International Auxiliary Language Association
