= Light characteristic =

Description of navigational light

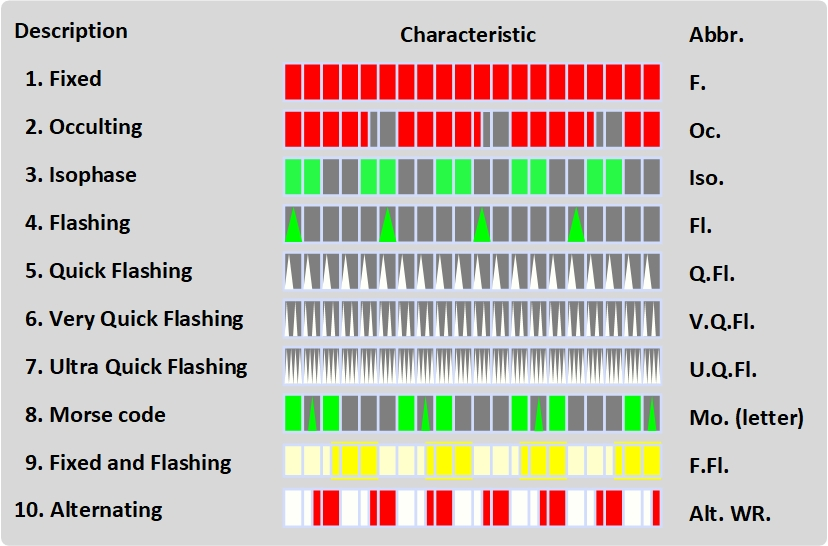
Symbols and abbreviations for light characteristics

A light characteristic is all of the properties that make a particular navigational light identifiable. Graphical and textual descriptions of navigational light sequences and colours are displayed on nautical charts and in Light Lists with the chart symbol for a lighthouse, lightvessel, buoy or sea mark with a light on it. Different lights use different colours, frequencies and light patterns, so mariners can identify which light they are seeing.

== Standardisation ==
The International Association of Marine Aids to Navigation and Lighthouse Authorities (IALA) publishes a recommendation R1001, "The IALA Maritime Buoyage System (MBS)", which is stated within to be adopted by almost all marine aids to navigation authorities. This recommendation sets out recommended light characteristics for different types of marine aids to navigation within the categories of lateral marks, cardinal marks, isolated danger marks, safe water marks, special marks, emergency wreck marks and other marks such as lighthouses. Depending on the marine aid to navigation, this recommendation includes specification of light colours (such as "red") and light patterns (such as "Fl" for flashing).

Light colours are defined in recommendation R0201, "Marine Signal Lights-Colours (E200-1)". This recommendation specifies for each named colour a polygon within the CIE 1931 color space for acceptable shades of the named colour a marine aid to navigation may exhibit.

Light patterns, including abbreviations, are defined in recommendation R0110, "Rhythmic Characters of Lights on Aids to Navigation".

== Abbreviations ==
Lightcharacter of the "Egmond aan Zee" (NL) lighthouse

While light characteristics can be described in prose, e.g. "Flashing white every two seconds", lists of lights and navigation chart annotations use abbreviations. The abbreviation notation is slightly different from one light list to another, with dots added or removed, but it usually follows a pattern similar to the following (see the chart to the right for examples).

- An abbreviation of the type of light, e.g. "Fl." for flashing, "F." for fixed.
- The color of the light, e.g. "W" for white, "G" for green, "R" for red, "Y" for yellow, "Bu" for blue. If no color is given, a white light is generally implied.
- The cycle period, e.g. "10s" for ten seconds.
- Additional parameters are sometimes added:

- The height of the light above the chart datum for height (usually based on high water). e.g. "15m" for 15 metres.
- The range in which the light is visible, e.g. "10M" for 10 nautical miles. (ca. 18.5 kilometers)
- A light that only shines in one direction, "Dir.". This is also indicated by a sector in which the light can be seen. In the figure of the lighthouse at "Egmond aan Zee" (Netherlands) two sectors are indicated; a white sector from 10° to 175° and a red sector from 175° to 188°.

An example of a complete light characteristic is "Gp Oc(3) W 10s 15m 10M". This indicates that the light is a group occulting light in which a group of three eclipses repeat every 10 seconds; the light is white; the light is 15 metres above the chart datum, and the nominal range is 10 nautical miles.

== Light patterns ==
=== Fixed light ===
Fixed lights, abbreviated "F", are a continuous and steady light. The IALA Marine Buoyage System does not include use of a fixed light pattern due to lack of differentiation as a marine aid to navigation light.

=== Flashing light ===
==== Single flashing light ====
Single flashing lights continuously repeat a flash of light of duration $l$ followed by an obviously longer duration $d$ of darkness. Every repetition is identical. Single flashing lights are abbreviated as "Fl".

The IALA Marine Buoyage System allows (but does not mandate) single flashing lights to be used for the following purposes:

- Port hand lateral marks, if the single flashing light has a colour of red and the mark is in region "A".
- Starboard hand lateral marks, if the single flashing light has a colour of green and the mark is in region "A".
- Port hand lateral marks, if the single flashing light has a colour of green and the mark is in region "B".
- Starboard hand lateral marks, if the single flashing light has a colour of red and the mark is in region "B".
- Special marks, if the single flashing light has a colour of yellow.

IALA recommendation R0110 specifies that a single flashing light should:

- Have a period of repetition within the range of $2 \leq p \leq 15$ seconds for countries which do not use "quick lights". This corresponds to frequency of 4 to 30 flashes per minute.
- Have a period of repetition within the range of $2.5 \leq p \leq 15$ seconds for countries which do use "quick lights". This corresponds to frequency of 4 to 24 flashes per minute.
- Have a duration $l$ of light less than 2 seconds within each period $p$.
- Have a duration $d$ of darkness between two successive flashes being three times or more the duration of a flash $l$. For example, if the frequency is 20 flashes per minute (period $p$ of 3 seconds), the duration $l$ of a flash may be 0.75 seconds and duration $d$ of darkness following may be 2.25 seconds to satisfy constraint $d\geq3l$.

If the duration $l$ of light is greater than or equal to 2 seconds, the flashing light may alternatively be classified as a "long flashing light".

If the frequency is greater than or equal to 50 flashes per minute (a period $p$ less than or equal to 1.2 seconds), the flashing light may alternatively be classified as a "quick light".

==== Long flashing light ====
Long flashing lights are a variant of single flashing lights where the duration $l$ of light is within the inclusive range of 2 to 5 seconds. Long flashing lights are abbreviated as "LFl", and in certain publications abbreviated alternatively as "L.Fl".

The IALA Marine Buoyage System allows (but does not mandate) long flashing lights to be used wherever a single flashing light is allowed to be used. The long flashing light must be used for the same purpose and have the same light colour as an equivalent single flashing light.

A white coloured long flashing light with a period $p$ of 10 seconds is additionally specified as an option for safe water marks.

To satisfy the $d\geq3l$ constraint specified by IALA recommendation R0110, a long flashing light has a minimum period $p$ of 8 seconds. The recommendation also specifies a maximum period $p$ of 20 seconds for long flashing lights, restricting duration $l$ to be no greater than 5 seconds. A long flashing light is therefore specified by the recommendation to have a frequency within the inclusive range of 3 to 7.5 flashes per minute.

==== Group flashing light ====
Group flashing lights continuously repeat a pattern consisting of a group of flashes followed by a duration of darkness between successive groups. The duration of darkness between successive groups must be obviously longer than the duration of darkness between flashes within a group. Every repetition is identical. Group flashing lights are abbreviated as "Fl(2)" for a group of two flashes, and in certain publications abbreviated additionally as "Gr Fl(2)".

The IALA Marine Buoyage System specifies group flashing lights be used for isolated danger marks where each group consists of two flashes of white light.

The IALA Marine Buoyage System allows (but does not mandate) group flashing lights to additionally be used wherever a single flashing light is allowed to be used. The group flashing light must be used for the same purpose and have the same light colour as an equivalent single flashing light.

IALA recommendation R0110 specifies that a group flashing light should:

- Have a period of repetition $p$ of no more than 20 seconds if each group consists of two flashes.
- Have a period of repetition $p$ of no more than 30 seconds if each group consists of three or more flashes.
- Have between 2 and 5 flashes in a group. By exception, the recommendation also allows groups to have 6 flashes.
- Have the same number of flashes in every group.
- Have the same duration $l$ of each flash of light.
- Have the same duration $d$ of darkness between every flash in a group.
- Have the same duration $d'$ of darkness between every group of flashes.
- Have a duration $d'$ of darkness between groups which is at least three times the duration $d$ of darkness between every flash in a group. For example, if duration $d$ is 1 second of darkness between each flash in a group, duration $d'$ must be 3 seconds or more of darkness between groups of flashes.
- Have a duration $c$ of at least 1 second where $c=l+d$, if each group consists of two flashes.
- Have a duration $c$ of at least 2 seconds where $c=l+d$, if each group consists of three or more flashes and the country deploying the group flashing light does not use "quick lights".
- Have a duration $c$ of at least 2.5 seconds where $c=l+d$, if each group consists of three or more flashes and the country deploying the group flashing light uses "quick lights".

==== Composite group flashing light ====
Composite group flashing lights are a variant of group flashing lights with two groups of flashes in each period. Group flashing lights are abbreviated as "Fl(2+1)" for a group of two flashes followed by a single flash (group of one flash). There are three durations of darkness for composite group flashing lights:

- $d$ as the duration of darkness between flashes in the same group (unchanged from group flashing lights).
- $d'$ as the duration of darkness between the first group of flashes and second group of flashes in a period.
- $d''$ as the duration of darkness between the second group of flashes of one period, and the first group of flashes of the next period.

The IALA Marine Buoyage System specifies composite group flashing lights be used for the following purposes:

- Port hand preferred channel marks, if the composite group flashing light has a colour of red, there are 2 flashes followed by 1 flash and the mark is in region "A".
- Starboard hand preferred channel marks, if the composite group flashing light has a colour of green, there are 2 flashes followed by 1 flash and the mark is in region "A".
- Port hand preferred channel marks, if the composite group flashing light has a colour of green, there are 2 flashes followed by 1 flash and the mark is in region "B".
- Starboard hand preferred channel marks, if the composite group flashing light has a colour of red, there are 2 flashes followed by 1 flash and the mark is in region "B".

The IALA Marine Buoyage System allows (but does not mandate) composite group flashing lights to be used for special marks if the light colour if yellow.

IALA recommendation R0110 specifies the following differences with group flashing lights:

- Composite group flashing lights have a period of repetition $p$ of no more than 30 seconds.
- The first group of flashes in a composite group flashing light period should only consist of two flashes. By exception, the recommendation also allows the first group to consist of three flashes.
- The second group of flashes in a composite group flashing light period should only consist of one flash.
- Composite group flashing lights should adhere to constraint $d'' \geq d'$. For a typical "Fl(2+1)" light, the period of darkness between a single flash and group of two flashes must be at least the same duration of darkness (but could be longer) as exists between a group of two flashes and a single flash.

=== Occulting light ===
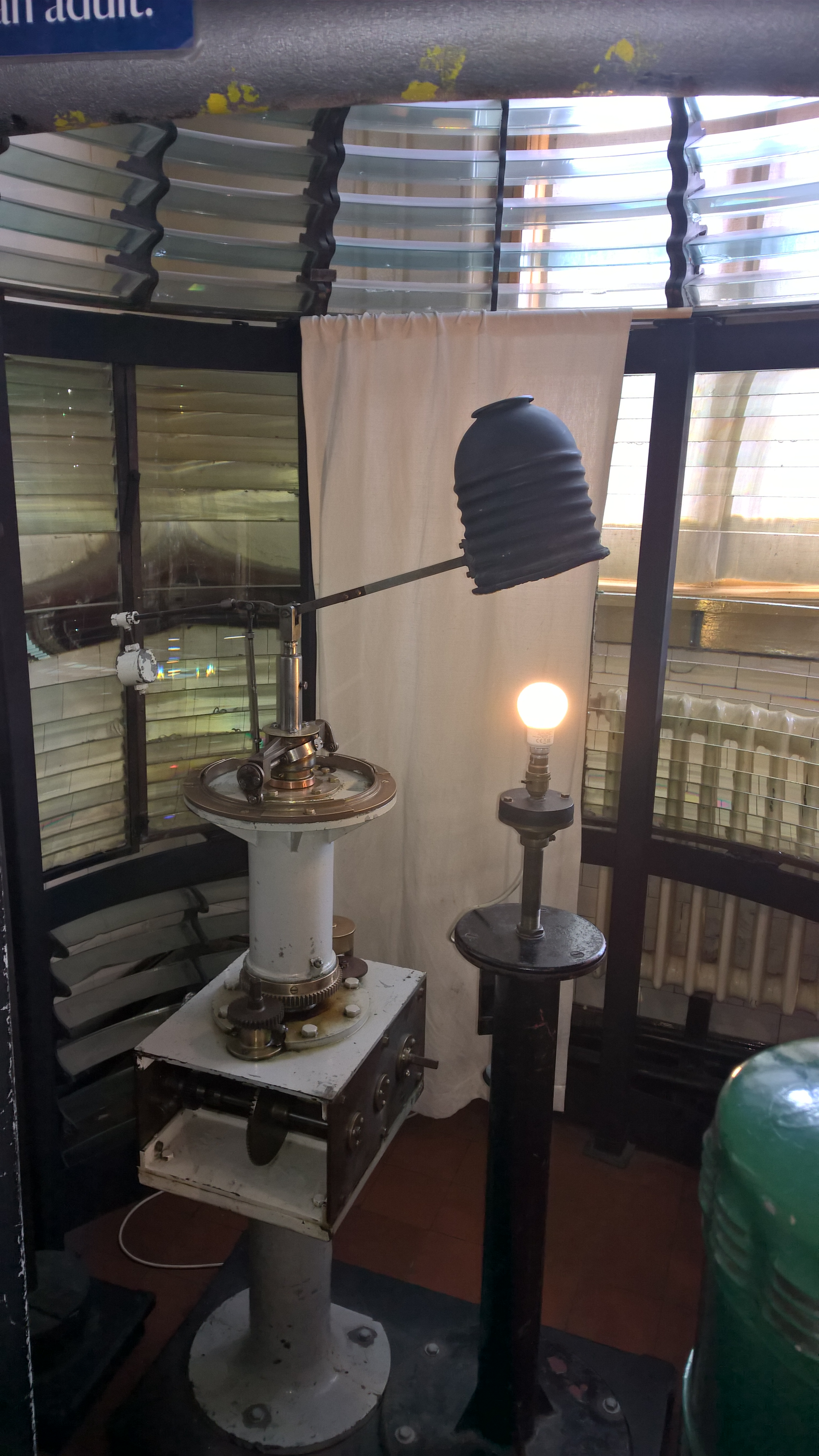
Clockwork occulting mechanism formerly in use at Coquet Island Lighthouse

An occulting light is a rhythmic light in which the duration of light in each period is longer than the total duration of darkness. In other words, it is the opposite to a flashing light where the total duration of darkness is longer than the duration of light. It has the appearance of flashing off, rather than flashing on. Like a flashing light, it can be used for a single occulting light that exhibits only a single period of darkness or the periods of darkness can be grouped and repeated at regular intervals (abbreviated "Oc"), a group (Oc(3)) or a composite group (Oc(2+1)).

The term occulting is used because originally the effect was obtained by a mechanism (e.g. a vertical or rotating shutter) periodically shading the light from view.

=== Isophase light ===
An isophase light, abbreviated "Iso", is a light which has dark and light periods of equal length. The prefix derives from the Greek iso- meaning "same".

=== Quick light ===
A quick light, abbreviated "Q", is a special case of a flashing light with a high frequency (more than 30 or 50 per minute). If the sequence of flashes is interrupted by regularly repeated eclipses of constant and long duration, the light is denoted "interrupted quick", abbreviated "I.Q".

Group notation similar to flashing and occulting lights is also sometimes used, e.g. Q(9).

Another distinction sometimes made is between quick (more than 50 and less than 80 flashes per minute), very quick (more than 80 and less than 160 flashes per minutes, abbreviated "V.Q") and ultra quick (no less than 160 flashes per minute, abbreviate "U.Q"). This can be combined with notations for interruptions, e.g. I.U.Q for interrupted ultra quick, or grouping, e.g. V.Q(9) for a very quick group of nine flashes. Quick characteristics can also be followed by other characteristics, e.g. VQ(6) LFl for a very quick group of six flashes, followed by a long flash.

=== Morse code ===
A Morse code light is light in which appearances of light of two clearly different durations (dots and dashes) are grouped to represent a character or characters in the Morse Code. For example, "Mo(A)" is a light in which in each period light is shown for a short period (dot) followed by a long period (dash), the Morse Code for "A".

=== Fixed and flashing ===
A fixed and flashing light, abbreviated "F. Fl", is a light in which a fixed low intensity light is combined with a flashing high intensity light.

=== Alternating ===
An alternating light, abbreviated "Al", is a light which shows alternating colors. For example, "Al WG" shows white and green lights alternately.

== Class of light ==
Table with light character examples
| Light type | Abbr. | General description | Example | Dome | CPS band [Cycle period in seconds / flash duration] |
|---|---|---|---|---|---|
| 1. Fixed light | F | A continuous, steady light. | F R | FR dome | FR_band |
2. Occulting light The total duration of light in each period is greater than the total duration of darkness and the dark intervals (occultations) usually have the same duration.
| 2.1 Single-occulting | Oc | A dark period is repeated regularly. | Oc R 6s [Lit 4.5s.- 1.5s] | OcR6s dome | OcR6s_band |
| 2.2 Group-occulting | Oc(x) | A group of dark periods are repeated regularly. | Oc(2) G 8s [Lit.6.5s.-ec.0.5s. + Lit.0.5-ec.0.5] | Oc(2)G8s dome | Oc(2)G8s_band |
| 2.3 Composite group-occulting | Oc(x+y) | Light similar to group-occulting, except that successive groups in the same period contain different numbers of dark periods. | Oc(2+3) W 18s [2x Lit.1.0s.-ec.1.0s. + Lit.5.0s-ec.1.0s + 2x Lit. 1.0s-ec.1.0s. + Lit 4.0s.] | Oc(2+3)W18s dome | Oc(2+3)W18s_band |
| 3. Isophase light | Iso | The duration of the light and dark periods are equal. | Iso G 4s [Fl.2.0s.-ec.2.0s.] | IsoG4s dome | IsoG4s band |
4. Flashing light The total duration of light in each period is less than the total duration of the dark and light appearances (flashes) usually have the same duration.
| 4.1 Single-flashing | Fl | A flash is repeated regularly at a rate below 50 per minute. | Fl G 5s [Fl.1.0s.-ec.4.0s.] | Flg5s dome | FlG5s band |
| 4.2 Long-flashing | L.Fl | A light flash, duration of more than 2 seconds (long flash) is repeated regularly. | L.Fl W 10s [Fl.3.0s.-ec.7.0s.] | LFLW10s dome | LFlW10s band |
| 4.3 Group-flashing | Fl(x) | A group of a specific number of flashes are repeated regularly. | Fl(3) R 15s[2x Fl.1.0s.-ec.1.0s. + Fl.1.0s.-ec.10.0s.] | Fl(3)15s dome | Fl(3)R15 band |
| 4.4 Composite group-flashing | Fl(x+y) | Similar to group-flashing, but with several groups of flashes. | Fl(2+1) W 15s [Fl.1.0s.-ec.1.0s. + Fl.1.0s.-ec.6.0s. + Fl.1.0s.-ec.5.0s.] | Fl(2+1)W15s dome | Fl(2+1)W15s band |
5. Quick flashing light Flashes are at a frequency of between 50 and 79 flashes per minute.
| 5.1 Quick flashing | Q | Quick flashes are repeated regularly. | Q W [Fl.0.5s.-ec.0.5s.] | QW dome | QW band |
| 5.2 Group quick flashing | Q(x) | Groups of a given number of quick flashes are repeated regularly. | Q(3) G 9s [3x Fl.0.5s.-ec.0.5s. + ec.6.0s.] | Q(3)G9s dome | Q(3)G9s band |
| | Q(x)+L.Fl. | Groups of a given number of quick flashes are repeated, regularly extended with a long flash. | Q.(6)+L.Fl. R 12s [6x Fl.0.5s.-ec.0.5s. Lit.2.0s.-ec.4.0s.] | Q(6)+LFlR12s dome | Q(6)+LFlR12s band |
| 5.3 Interrupted quick flashing | I.Q | The sequence of flashes is regularly interrupted by dark intervals of constant duration. | IQ.(9)W 12s [9x Fl.0.5s.-ec.0.5s. + ec.3.0s.] | Q(9)W12s dome | Q(9)W12s band |
6. Very quick flashing light Flashes are repeated at a frequency between 80 and 159 flashes per minute.
| 6.1 Very quick flashing | VQ | Very quick flashes are repeated regularly. | VQ.W [Fl.0.25s.-ec.0.25s.] | VQW dome | VQW band |
| 6.2 Group very quick flashing | VQ(x) | Groups of a given number of very quick flashes are repeated regularly. | VQ.(3)G 4s [3x Fl.0.25s.-ec.0.25s. + ec.2.5s.] | VQ(3)G4s dome | VQ(3)G4s band |
| | VQ(x)+LFl. | Groups of a given number of very quick flashes are repeated regularly, and a long Flash. | VQ.(10)+LFl.R 12s. [10x Fl.0.5s.-ec.0.5s. + Lit.2.0s.-ec.5.0s] | VQ(10)+LFlR12s dome | VQ(10)+LFlR12s band |
| 6.3 Interrupted very quick flashing | I.VQ | The sequence of flashes is regularly interrupted by dark intervals of constant duration. | I.VQ R 9s [10x Fl.0.25s.-ec.0.25s. + ec.7.0s.] | IVQ(10)R12s dome | IVQ(10)R12s band |
7. Ultra quick flashing The flashes are repeated at a frequency equal to or greater than 160 flashes per minute.
| 7.1 Ultra quick flashing | UQ | Ultra quick flashes are repeated regularly. | UQ W [Fl.0.125s.-ec.0.125s.] | UQW dome | UQW band |
| 7.2 Interrupted ultra quick flashing | I.UQ | The sequence of ultra quick flashes is regularly interrupted by dark intervals of constant duration. | I.UQ R 6s[24x Fl.0.125s.-ec.3.125s.] | IUQR9s dome | IUQR9s band |
| 8. Morse code | Mo(x) | The flashes have markedly different durations and are grouped together to form one or more characters in Morse code. | Mo(K) G 6s [Fl.1.0s.-ec.0.25s. + Fl.0.5s-ec.0.25s.+ Fl.1.0s.-ec.3.0s.] | Mo(K)G6s dome | Mo(K)G6s band |
| 9. Fixed and flashing | F.Fl | A light that combines a fixed light with a light flashing with a stronger intensity. The flashes of light may have any of the features described in above. | F.Fl Y 5s [Lit.2.5s.-Fl.2.5s.] | FFlY5s dome | FFlY5s band |
| 10. Alternating | Al | Light that alternately displays different colors. Note - The alternating light can be used in conjunction with most of the lights earlier classes. | Al WR 3s [Lit.W 1.5s.-Lit.R 1.5s.] | AlWR3s dome | AlWR3s band |

== See also ==
- Lighthouse
- Pilotage
- Sector light
- Signal lamp
