= Lateral mark =

Sea mark marking the edge of a channel

Visual buoyage, IALA region B, by day. Lateral marks in IALA region A have the same shapes but opposite colours.

A lateral buoy, lateral post or lateral mark, as defined by the International Association of Marine Aids to Navigation and Lighthouse Authorities, is a sea mark used in maritime pilotage to indicate the edge of a channel.

Each mark indicates the edge of the safe water channel in terms of port (left-hand) or starboard (right-hand). These directions are relative to the direction of buoyage; this is usually a nominally upstream direction. In a river, the direction of buoyage is towards the river's source; in a harbour, the direction of buoyage is into the harbour from the sea. Where there may be doubt, it will be labelled on the appropriate chart. Often the cardinal mark system is used instead when confusion about the direction would be common.

A vessel heading in the direction of buoyage (e.g. into a harbour) and wishing to keep in the main channel should:

- keep port marks to its port (left) side, and
- keep starboard marks to its starboard (right) side.

== IALA System ==
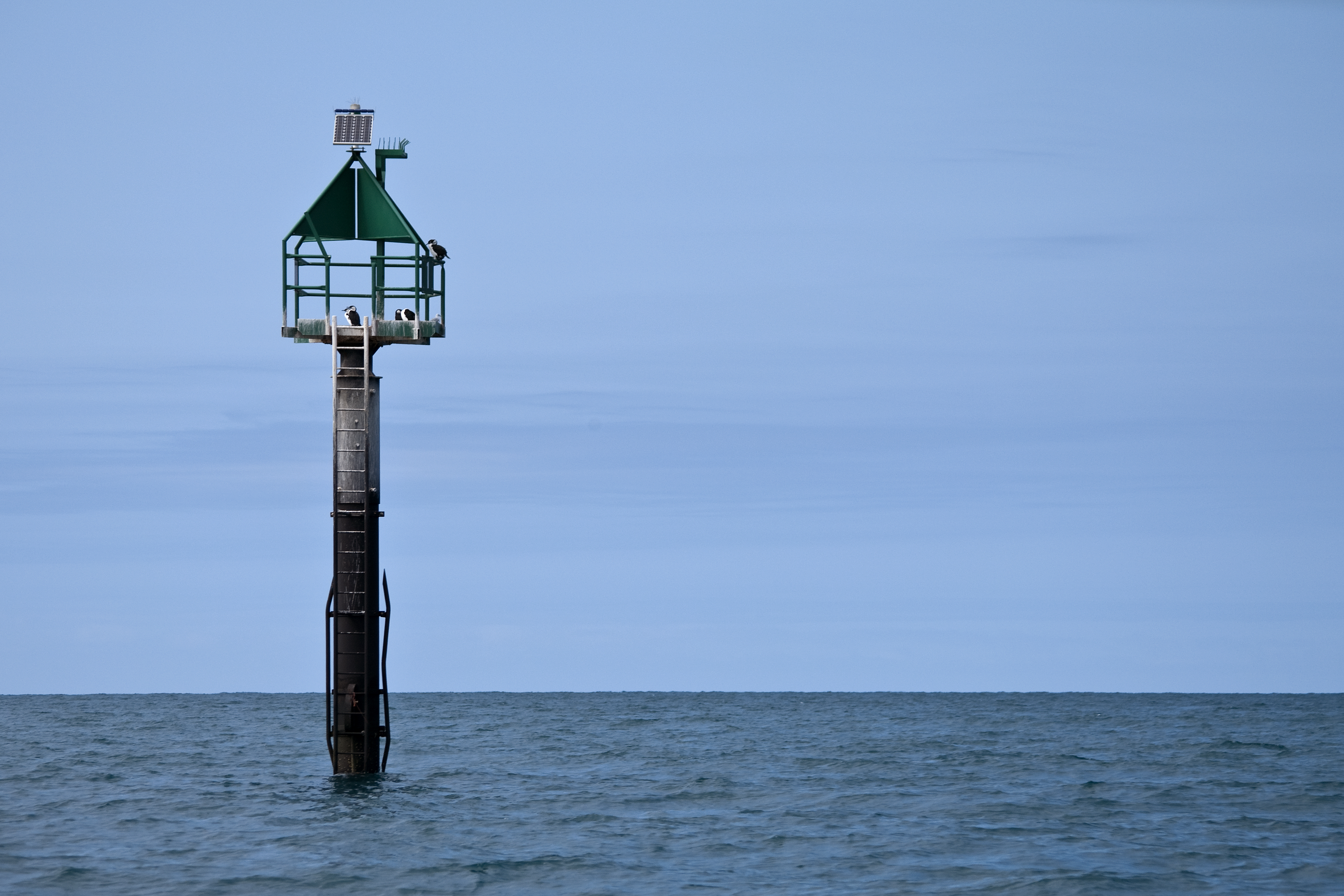
A Region A lateral mark, showing both the green color and the triangular symbol, denoting the channel at the entrance to the Port River near Adelaide, South Australia

Marks are distinguished by their shape and colour, being red or green.

For historical reasons, two different schemes are in use worldwide, differing in their use of colour. Previously there had been 30 different buoyage systems, before IALA rationalised the system. In 1980 on a conference convened by IALA, they agreed to adopt the rules of a new combined system, which combined the previous two systems (A and B) into one system, with two regions (A and B).

The IALA defines them as Region A and Region B:

=== Region A ===
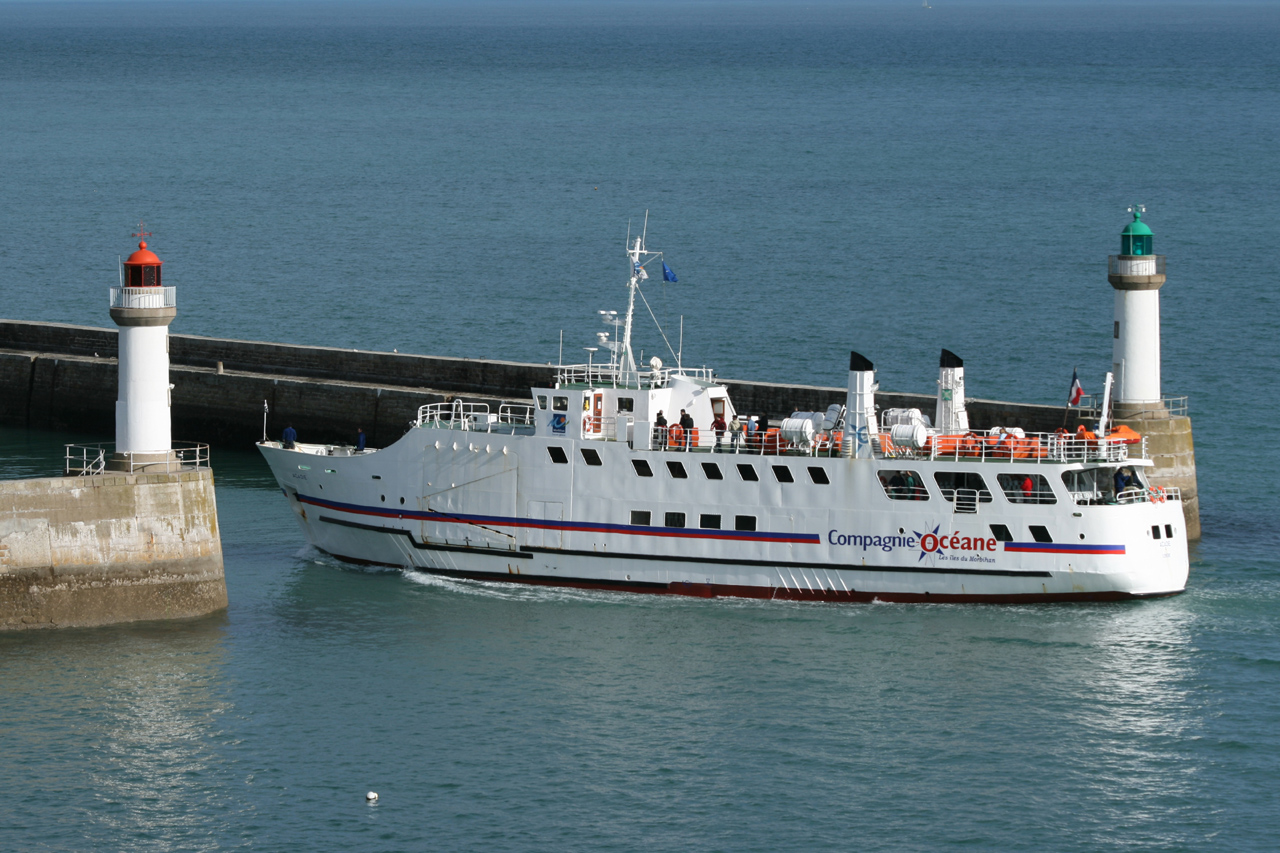
IALA region A: Red port / green starboard marks when entering from sea into Le Palais, France

- comprises Europe, Africa, and most of Asia and Oceania, as well as Greenland.
- port marks are red and may have a red flashing light of any light characteristic except composite group flashing 2+1 (having abbreviation "Fl(2+1)").
- starboard marks are green and may have a green flashing light of any light characteristic except "Fl(2+1)".

(Port) (Left) (Red)	(Starboard) (Right) (Green)

=== Region B ===
- comprises the Americas, Japan, South Korea, the Philippines, Taiwan, Hawaii, and Easter Island.
- port marks are green and may have a green flashing light of any light characteristic except "Fl(2+1)".
- starboard marks are red and may have a red flashing light of any light characteristic except "Fl(2+1)".

(Port) (Left) (Green)	(Starboard) (Right) (Red)

=== Both regions ===

Port hand marks are cylindrical (also known as a "can"), pillar or spar in shape. If a top mark is attached it has a cylinder (can) shape.

Starboard hand marks are conical, pillar or spar in shape. If a top mark is attached it has a conical shape with the point facing upwards.

The shape is an important feature, as colours cannot be distinguished in some light conditions, or by persons with red-green colour blindness. Marks may also carry unique markings of letters and numbers; these may be used to identify the mark as one indicated on a nautical chart. Likewise, a mark's light may flash in a distinctive sequence for the same purpose.

When a channel divides, as for instance a channel to a smaller harbour off a main river, then a preferred channel or bifurcation mark is used. The mark has the same shape and main colour as a port- or starboard- hand mark for the main channel. It bears in addition a horizontal band with the appropriate colour for the smaller channel. For example: region A, main channel straight on, creek leading to marina to port. The buoy where the channels divide would be a red cylindrical can or pillar with a cylindrical top mark. Around the middle would be a green band. In IALA region B the shape would be identical, but the main colour would be green with a red band. See the buoy by the island in the diagram above.

In Region A only, the phrase "Is there any red port left?" (referring to the red colour of the fortified wine "port") may be used as a mnemonic, indicating that a red mark must be kept on the left when "returning" to (i.e., entering) a harbour or river.

In Region B only, the phrase "red right returning" may be used as a mnemonic, indicating that a red mark must be kept on the right when returning to (i.e., entering) a harbour or river.

== See also ==
- Cardinal mark
- Isolated danger mark
- Light characteristic
- Safe water mark
- Special mark
- Emergency wreck buoy
