= Isolated danger mark =

Sea mark indicating a danger spot

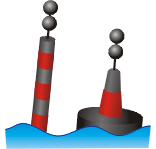
Examples of Isolated Danger Marks

An Isolated Danger Mark, as defined by the International Association of Lighthouse Authorities, is a sea mark used in maritime pilotage to indicate a hazard to shipping such as a partially submerged rock.

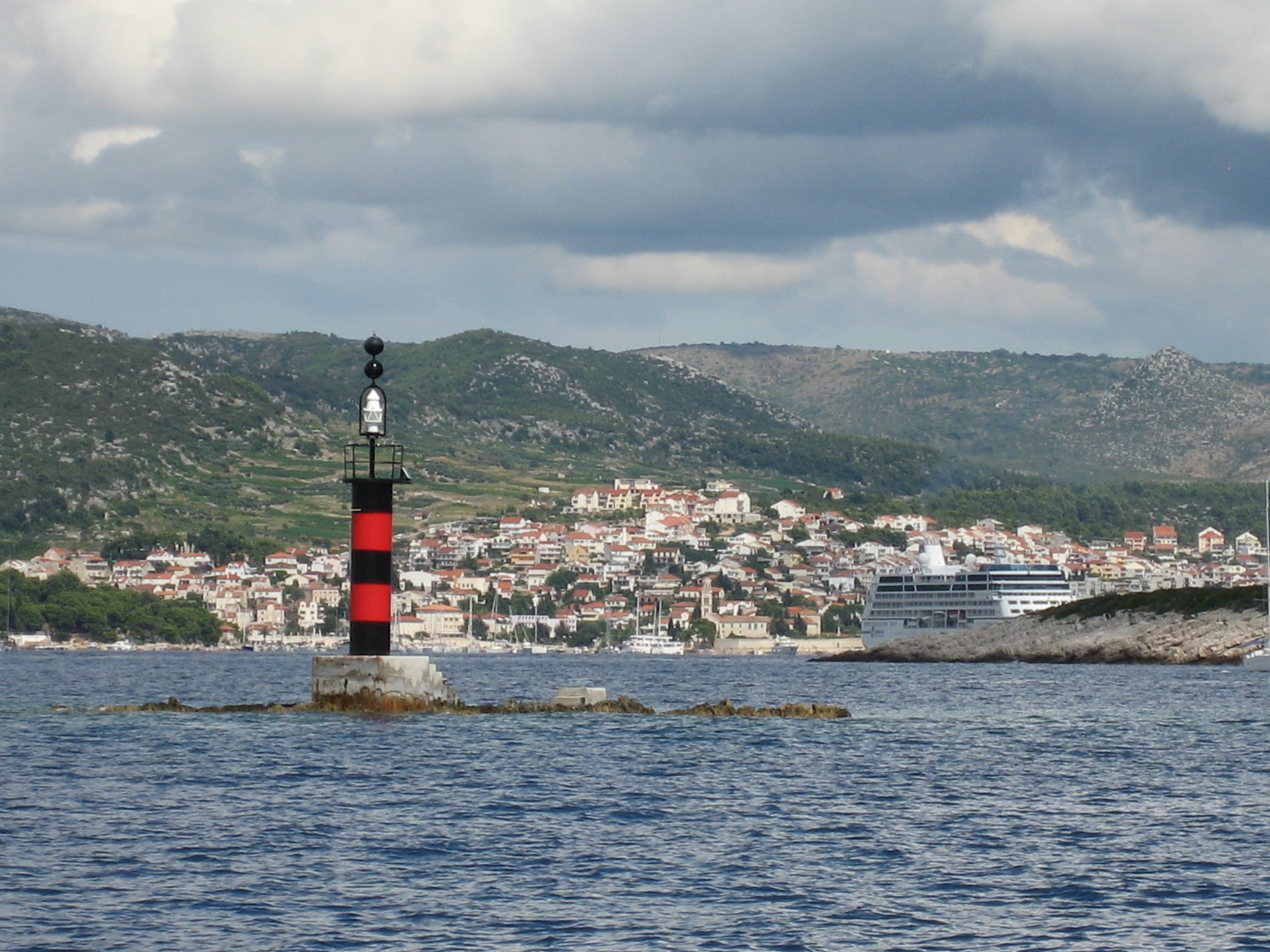
Isolated Danger Mark near Hvar, Croatia

Isolated danger marks are recognisable by the following characteristics:

- Generally a pillar or spar shape, but could alternatively be any other shape as long as the shape is different from those used for lateral marks.
- Coloured black with one or more broad horizontal red bands.
- Always having a topmark attached which is two black spheres stacked vertically.
- If a light is fitted, it is white in colour and has a light characteristic of group flashing 2 (abbreviated as "Fl(2) W"). Two flashes of white light in succession are followed by a longer duration of darkness.

== See also ==
- Navigation
- Lateral mark
- Cardinal mark
- Safe water mark
- Special mark
- Emergency wreck buoy
- Light characteristic
