= Special mark =

Type of sea mark

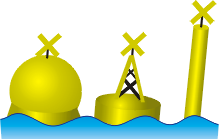
Examples of Special Marks

A Special mark indicating an outfall pipe in the Irish Sea off Helen's Bay, Northern Ireland. It has the group flashing sequence "Fl(2) Y" meaning it flashes yellow twice followed by a longer period of darkness.

A Special Mark, as defined by the International Association of Lighthouse Authorities, is a sea mark used in maritime pilotage. It is recognisable by its yellow colour and "X" (also referred to as a St. Andrews Cross or saltire) top-mark. If a light is fitted the light is always yellow in colour and can have any light characteristic which differs from those used for cardinal marks, isolated danger marks, mobile aid to navigation marks and safe water marks.

== Purpose ==
Special marks can indicate:

- Administrative areas
- Water skiing areas
- Anchorage areas
- Mooring areas
- Waiting areas
- Marine farms
- Oil wells
- Dead ends
- Pipelines
- Spoil ground (an area where dredged material is deposited)
- Historic wrecks
- Protected areas
- Outfall pipes (such as Stormwater, and Cooling water)
- Sewerage pipes
- Intake pipes
- Submarine cables

== Other uses ==
- Buoys, such as a Weather buoy or Mooring buoy are coloured yellow or have a yellow light to indicate it is not an aid to navigation.

== See also ==
- Navigation
- Lateral mark
- Cardinal mark
- Safe water mark
- Isolated danger mark
- Light characteristic
