= Cardinal mark =

Sea mark indicating where safe water is near to a hazard

Diagram of cardinal marks as seen during the day, with their light patterns. The lights shown here are configured as "Quick".

A cardinal mark is a sea mark (a buoy or other floating or fixed structure) commonly used in maritime pilotage to indicate the position of a hazard and the direction of safe water.

Cardinal marks indicate the direction of safety as a cardinal (compass) direction (north, east, south or west) relative to the mark. This makes them meaningful regardless of the direction or position of the approaching vessel, in contrast to the (perhaps better-known) lateral mark system.

== Characteristics ==
The characteristics and meanings of cardinal marks are as defined by the International Association of Lighthouse Authorities.

A cardinal mark indicates one of the four compass directions by:

- the direction of its two conical top-marks, which can both point up, indicating north; down, indicating south; towards each other, indicating west; or away from each other, indicating east
- its distinctive pattern of black and yellow stripes, which follows the orientation of the cones - the black stripe is in the position pointed to by the cones (e.g. at the top for a north cardinal, in the middle for a west cardinal)
- optionally, its distinctive light characteristic, which consists of a sequence of quick or very quick flashes whose number gives the clockface position which corresponds to the direction of the cardinal (e.g. three for an east cardinal, nine for a west; north has continuous flashes, and south may be augmented with a long flash, to help distinguish it from a west in difficult conditions)

Summary of mark characteristics
Characteristic	North	South	East	West
Shape	Upward facing triangle above an upward facing triangle	Downward facing triangle above an downward facing triangle	Upward facing triangle above a downward facing triangle	Downward facing triangle above an upward facing triangle
Colour	Black above yellow	Yellow above black	Yellow horizontal band on a black body	Black horizontal band on a yellow body
Topmark (always attached)	▲ ▲ Both cones point upwards	▼ ▼ Both cones point downwards	▲ ▼ Cones point away from each other	▼ ▲ Cones point towards each other
Light colour (if light attached)	White	White	White	White
Light characteristic (if light attached)	Continuous flashes at a rate of at least 50 per minute Abbreviated as one of: VQ W; Q W	6 quick flashes followed by 1 long flash, repeated every 10 or 15 seconds Abbreviated as one of: VQ(6) LFl W 10s; Q(6) LFl W 15s	3 flashes, repeated every 5 or 10 seconds Abbreviated as one of: VQ(3) W 5s; Q(3) W 10s	9 flashes, repeated every 10 or 15 seconds Abbreviated as one of: VQ(9) W 10s; Q(9) W 15s

Either a quick or a very quick sequence of light flashes may be used; the choice allows for two similar nearby marks to be uniquely identified by their lights.

A cardinal mark may be used to accomplish the following:

- Indicate that the deepest water is an area on the named side of the mark
- Indicate the safe side on which to pass a danger
- Draw attention to a feature in a channel, such as a bend, junction, branch, or end of a shoal
- Draw attention to a new danger such as a grounded ship. In such cases two equal marks are often placed together to indicate that it's a newly marked danger and is not yet printed in official charts.

Other uses:

- Sometimes a Cardinal Mark can be used instead of a Special mark to indicate a spoil ground, or an outfall pipe for example. A few examples can be seen on the South Coast of England and in Northern France.

== Mnemonics ==
The north and south topmarks are self-explanatory (both cones pointing up, or both pointing down). Remembering the east and west marks can be more of a problem.

The most natural way to distinguish the topmarks for east and west is to "follow the Sun"—the top cone indicates the direction the Sun would appear to move when visible in the part of the sky that corresponds to the mark's communicated direction, while the bottom cone indicates likewise for the Sun's reflection on a calm ocean surface. So when a topmark consists of two cones pointing away from each other, this should suggest the Sun moving away from its reflection on a calm ocean surface, which happens when the Sun rises, and a rising Sun is visible to the east. Likewise, a topmark with two cones pointing toward each other should suggest a setting Sun, which is visible to the west.

Other mnemonics have been devised for the east and west marks in case the mnemonic that uses the Sun is difficult to grasp. For example:

- East looks like an Easter egg. The western mark has a pinched waist: "Western women have wasp waists".
- East looks like a classical letter E/epsilon. The western mark looks like a "W" on its side, or "West winds wool" (looks like a bobbin)
- East is larger around the middle: "Equatorially enlarged". West is a woman's waist.
- West looks like a wine glass with the narrow stem and wide top and bottom.

The colours can be remembered this way: The two conical top-marks always point to black.

- If the top-marks point to the top, black is at the top.
- If the top-marks point to the bottom, black is at the bottom.
- If the top-marks point to the middle, black is at the middle.
- If the top-marks point to the outside, black is at the outside.

== Gallery ==
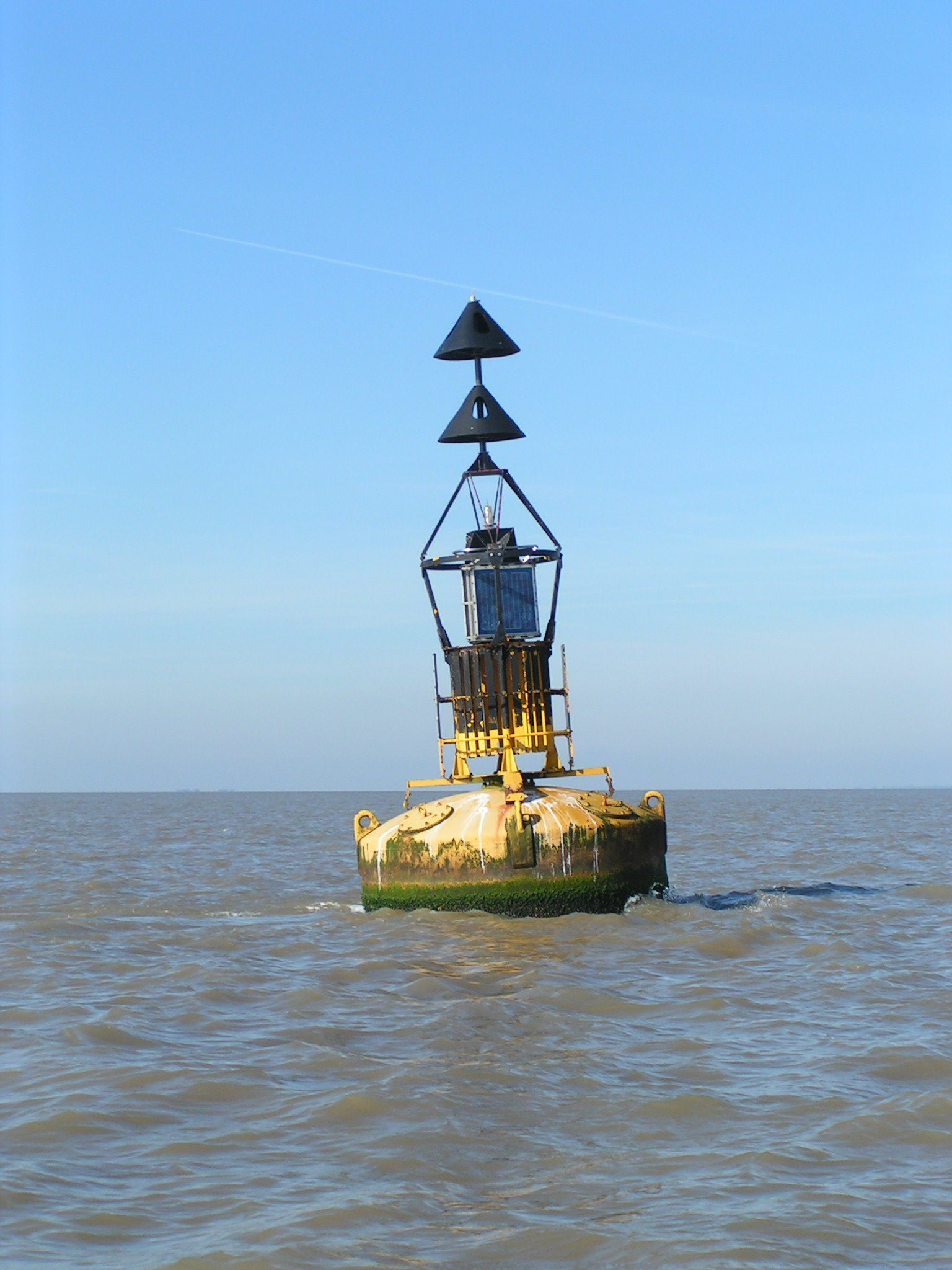
Knoll North Cardinal

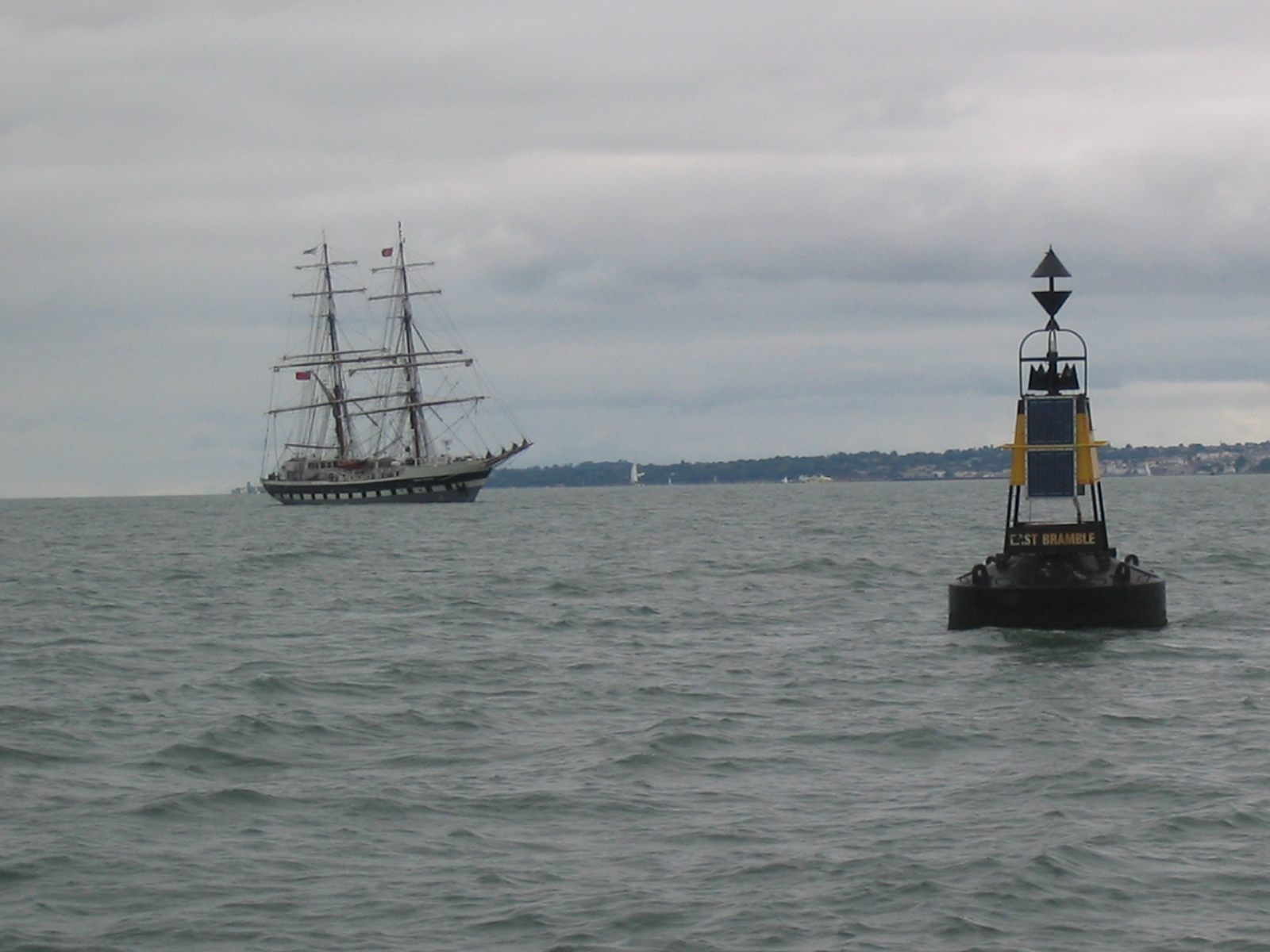
The 'East Bramble' East Cardinal Mark helps the Stavros S Niarchos navigate safely in the Solent, August 2008

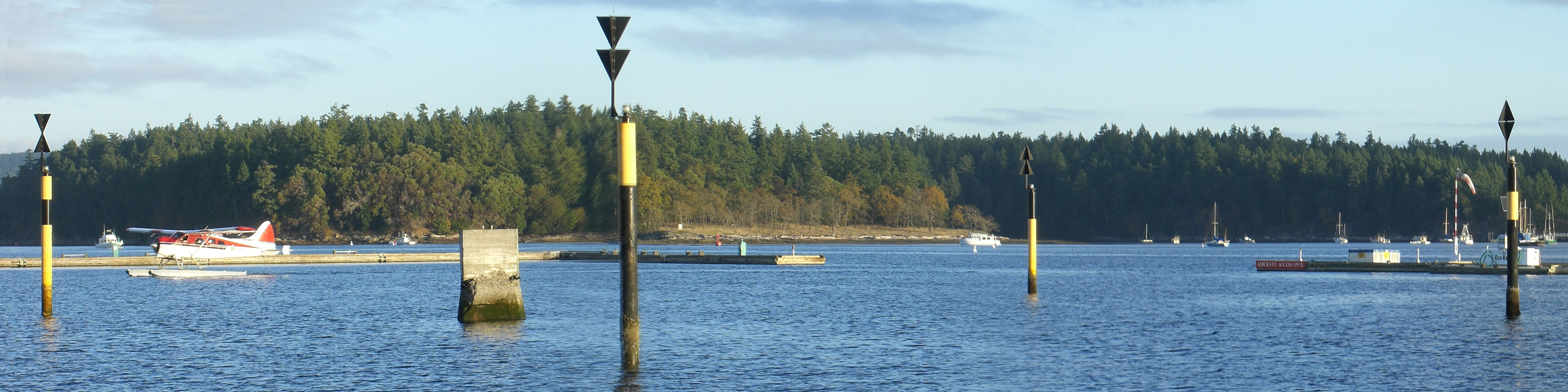
All four types of cardinal mark used in Nanaimo Harbour to warn of an old concrete base.

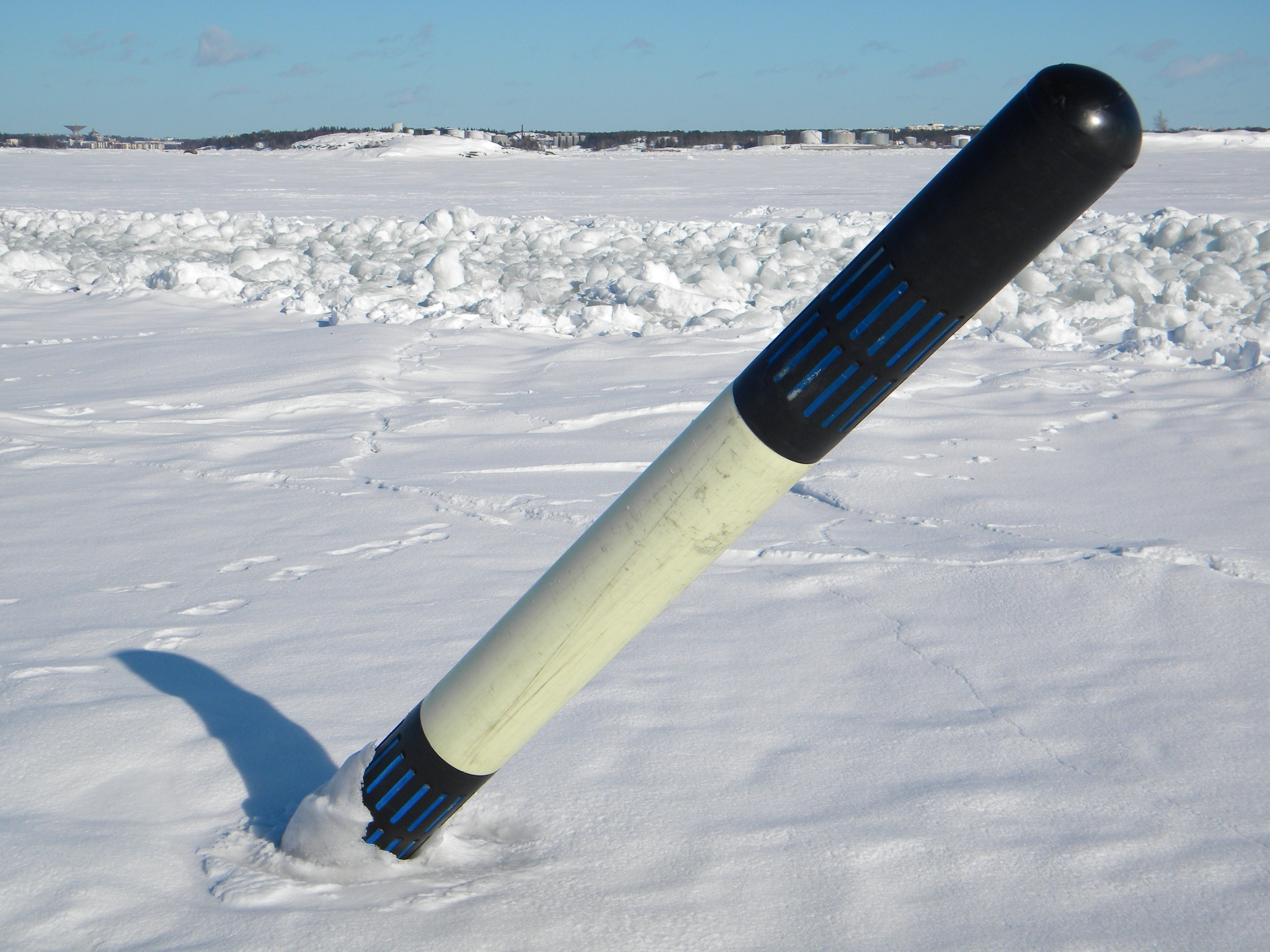
A light buoying cardinal mark (east) in pressure of ice in front of Helsinki, Finland in winter. Notice that topmark is not used on a buoy that is subjected to ripping by movements of ice.

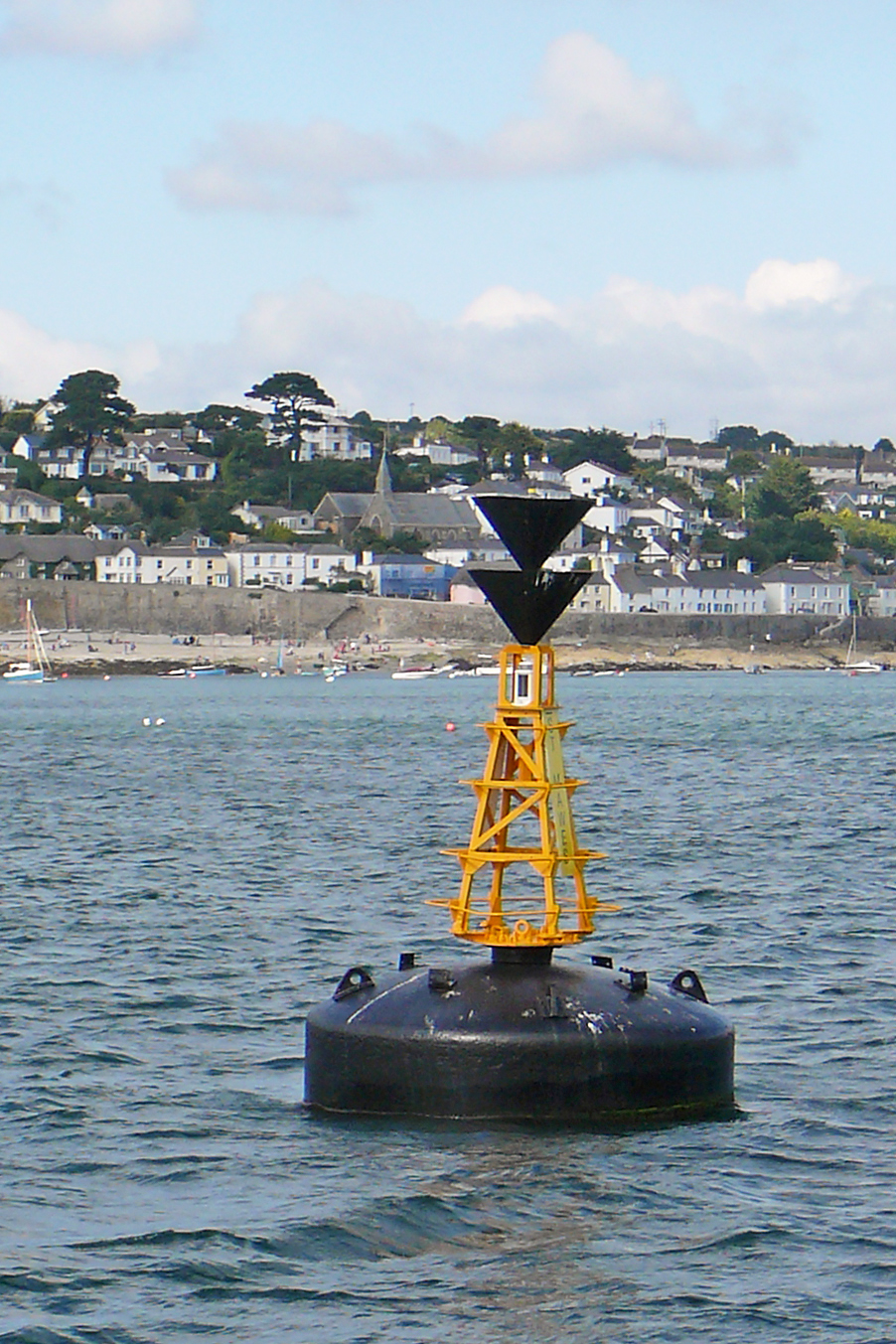
A south cardinal mark buoy off St Mawes, UK

== See also ==
- Navigation – Process of monitoring and controlling the movement of a craft or vehicle
- Lateral mark – Sea mark marking the edge of a channel
- Safe water mark – Type of sea mark
- Isolated danger mark – Sea mark indicating a danger spot
- Special mark – Type of sea mark
- Emergency wreck buoy – Marker buoy warning of a wreck
- Light characteristic

== Citations ==
- Cunliffe, Tom (2016) [2002], The complete day skipper (fifth ed.), Adlard Coles nautical (an imprint of Bloomsbury), ISBN 978-1-4729-2416-2
- IALA, Cardinal Marks (PDF), IALA, archived from the original (PDF) on 2007-12-14
- IALA (2010), Maritime buoyage system and other aids to navigation (PDF), IALA (International association of maritime aids to navigation and lighthouse authorities)
- Noice, Alison (2013) [2007], Day skipper for sail & power (second ed.), Adlard Coles nautical (an imprint of Bloomsbury), ISBN 978-1-4081-9310-5
- RYA (1985) [1981], Navigation, an RYA manual (second ed.), Newton Abbot: David & Charles, ISBN 0-7153-8631-X
- Sanders, John (2018), "Cardinal Marks", Boatschool
