= Safe water mark =

Type of sea mark

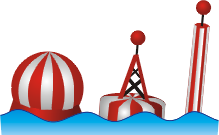
Examples of safe water marks

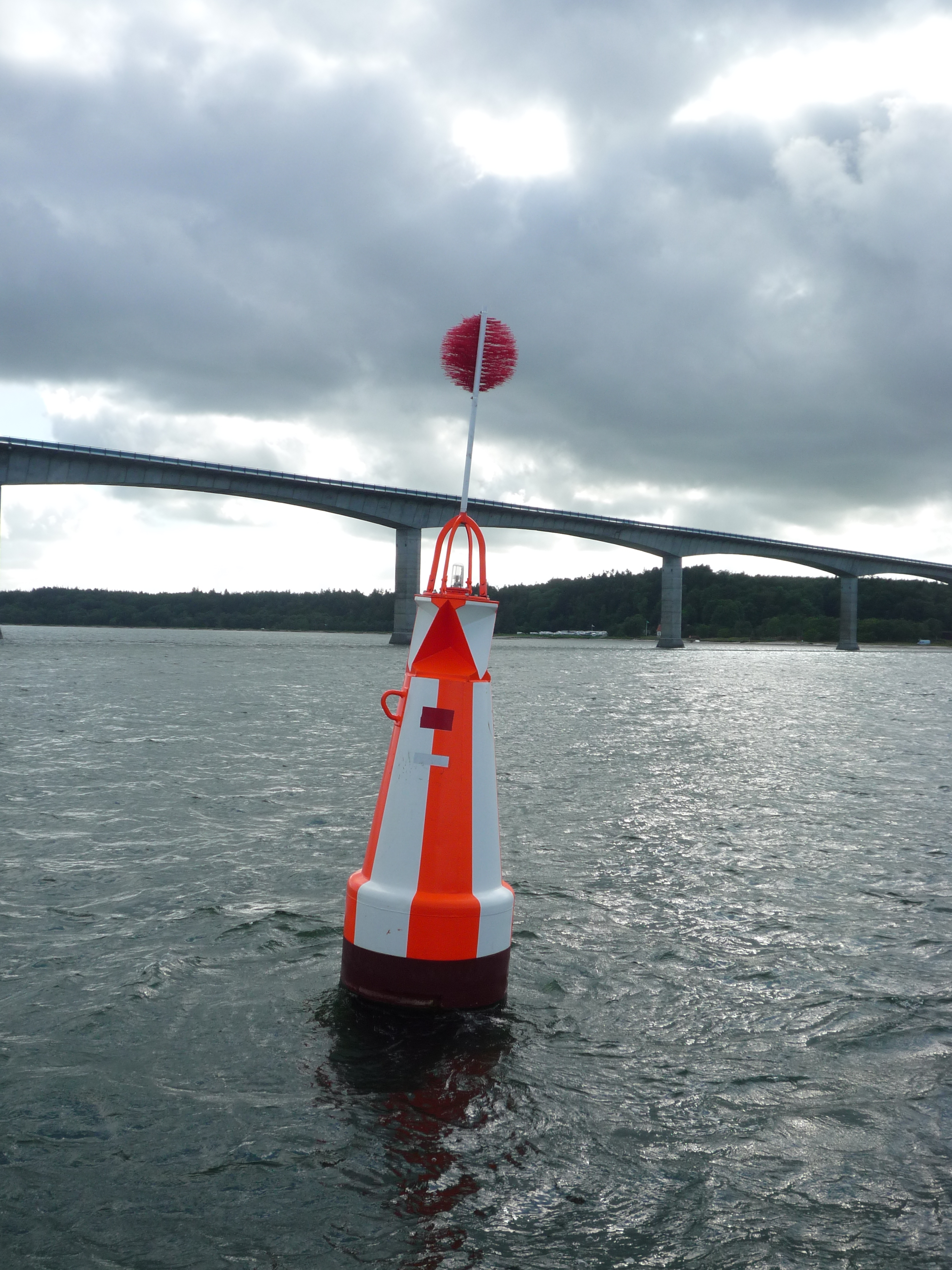
An example of a safe water mark in Limfjord, Denmark

A safe water mark, as defined by the International Association of Lighthouse Authorities, is a sea mark used in maritime pilotage to indicate the end of a channel. They usually imply that open, deep and safe water lies ahead. They are also used to indicate the start and end of a buoyed section of a continuous narrow channel; and a series of them may mark a safe route through shallow areas. It is therefore important to consult appropriate charts to determine their meaning in each location. They are also known as fairway buoys and clear water buoys.

Safe water marks are recognisable by the following characteristics:

- Spherical, pillar or spar in shape. For safe water marks with a spar shape, a topmark is always attached.
- Colour pattern of alternating red and white vertical stripes.
- If a topmark is attached, it is a single red sphere.
- If a light is fitted, it is white in colour and has one of the following light characteristics:
  - Iso W: Isophase (repeated flashing of light with equal durations of light and darkness).
  - Oc W, Oc(x) W or Oc(x+y) W: Occulting (flashing of light where the duration of light obviously exceeds the duration of darkness).
  - LFl W 10s: Long flash of light (duration 2 seconds or greater) repeated every 10 seconds.
  - Mo(A) W: Morse code "A" (di-dah) flashing sequence.

In the United States, safe water marks are printed with the initials of their associated waterways or localities.

== See also ==
- Navigation
- Lateral mark
- Cardinal mark
- Isolated danger mark
- Special mark
- Light characteristic
