= International Organization for Marine Aids to Navigation =

International association coordinating lighthouses and buoyage

The International Organization for Marine Aids to Navigation, previously known as International Association of Lighthouse Authorities (IALA), is an association founded in 1957 to collect and provide nautical expertise and advice. IALA is also known by its French name of Association Internationale de Signalisation Maritime (AISM).

== Background ==
IALA brings together representatives of the aids to navigation services of about 80 countries for technical coordination, information sharing, and coordination of improvements to aids to navigation throughout the world. It was established in 1957 to provide a permanent organization to support the goals of the Technical Lighthouse Conferences, which had been convening since 1929. The General Assembly of IALA meets about every four years. The council of 24 members meets twice a year to oversee the ongoing programs.

Four committees maintain work programs established for four year periods:

- DTEC – digital technologies;
- ARM – Aids to Navigation Requirements and Management – concentrating on management issues experienced by members;
- ENG – Engineering and Sustainability – concentrating on the engineering aspects of all aids to navigation and their impact on the environment, the committee is also in charge of overseeing the IALA activities regarding the preservation of historic lighthouses and equipment;
- VTS – Vessel Traffic Services – concentrating on all issues surrounding VTS

IALA committees provide important documentation to the International Hydrographic Organization and other international organizations, while the IALA Secretariat acts as a clearing house for the exchange of technical information, and organizes seminars and technical support for developing countries.

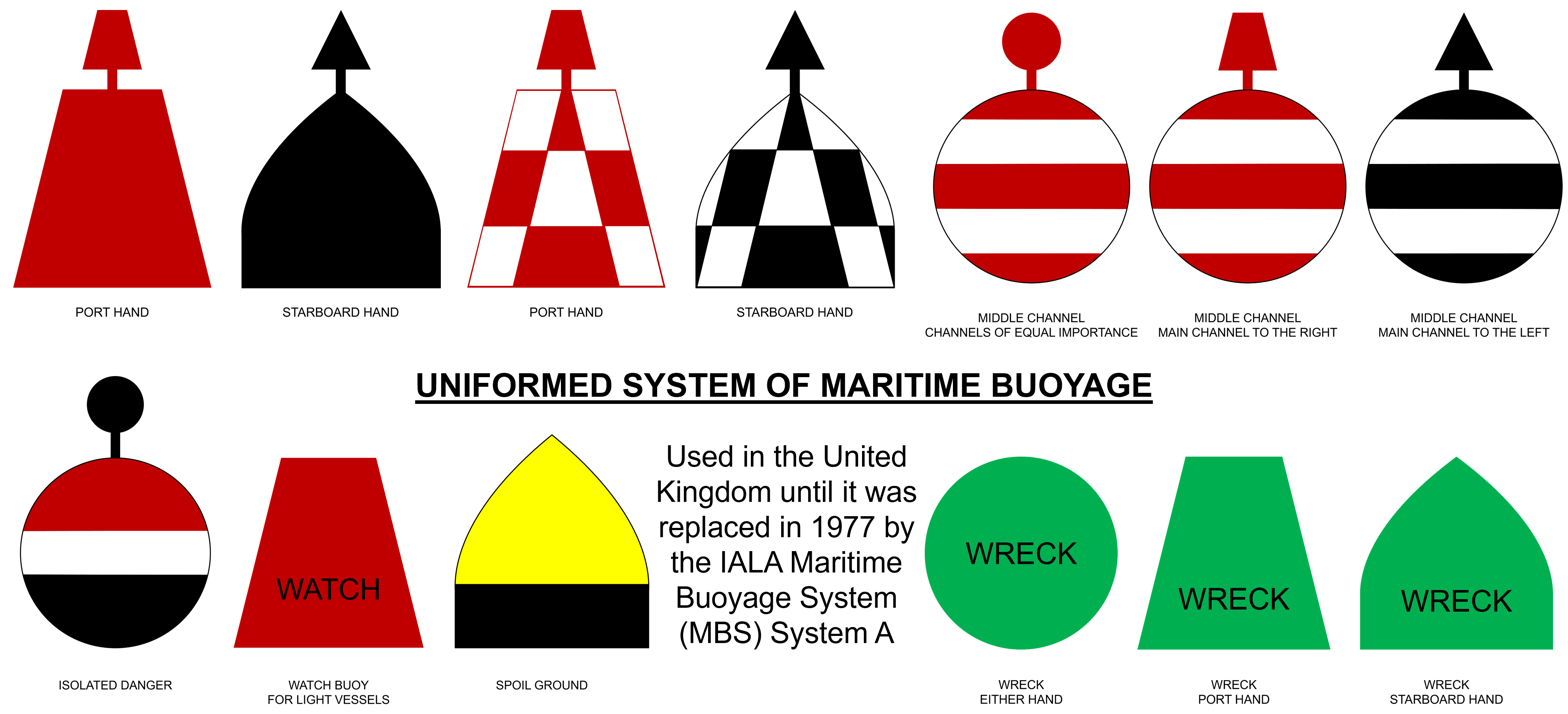
Diagram of Heritage Buoyage used in the United Kingdom before 1977

Its principal work since 1973 has been the implementation of the IALA Maritime Buoyage System. This system replaced some 30 dissimilar buoyage systems in use throughout the world with 2 major systems. This rationalised system was introduced as a result of two accidents in the Dover Straits in 1971 when the Brandenburg hit the wreck of the Texaco Caribbean off Folkestone and sank although the wreck was accurately buoyed. A short while later the Niki also struck the Texaco Caribbean and sank, despite the wreckage being adequately marked. The combined loss of lives in these two accidents was 51 persons.

Although the international agreement of 1982 implementing a harmonized buoyage system is a major achievement for IALA the Organization, through its committees, carried out a lot of works in other directions resulting in innovating techniques being adopted all over the world, such as the AIS (Automatic Identification System), DGNSS (Differential Global Navigation System) and many others.

Its future achievement is likely to be the implementation of the e-navigation. e-navigation does not aim at ships being electronically operated but gathering and displaying all navigation information through connected sources of information and harmonized data exchange.

IALA is based near Paris in Saint-Germain-en-Laye, France.

After 10 years of diplomatic effects and conferences' efforts, on 22 August 2024, IALA transited its status from Non-governmental Organization to Intergovernmental Organization.

== Membership ==
As of November 2025, IALA has 42 member states that have ratified, accepted or acceded the Convention on the International Organization for Marine Aids to Navigation:

- Albania
- Argentina
- Australia
- Belgium
- Brazil
- Bulgaria
- Canada
- Chile
- China
- Croatia
- Cuba
- Denmark
- Egypt
- Finland
- France
- Germany
- Iceland
- India
- Ireland
- Italy
- Japan
- Malaysia
- Mexico
- Netherlands
- Norway
- Oman
- Panama
- Portugal
- Qatar
- Romania
- Russia
- Saudi Arabia
- Singapore
- Slovenia
- Solomon Islands
- South Korea
- Spain
- Sweden
- Tunisia
- Turkey
- United Kingdom
- Uruguay

== Main recommendations ==
IALA is primarily known for the IALA Maritime Buoyage Systems or sea mark systems that are used in the pilotage of vessels at sea:

- Lateral marks indicate the edges of a channel.
- Cardinal marks indicate the direction of safe water at a dangerous spot.
- Safe water marks indicate the deep water and open end of a channel.
- Special marks indicate a special area or feature, e.g. pipe-outfall, areas of: administration/speed restriction/water-skiing, etc.
- Isolated danger marks indicate a hazard to shipping.
- Emergency Wreck Marking Buoy : Temporary interim measure(s) deployed to mark any new wreck, (IALA Recommendation O-133, introduced in 2006).

Each type of mark has a distinctive colour, shape and possibly a characteristic light.

== IALA sea mark regions ==
The IALA Maritime Buoyage System defines two regions in the world: IALA region A and IALA region B. Region B covers the whole of the Americas, Japan, South Korea and the Philippines, while the rest of the world belongs to the region A.

== Sources ==
The text of "Background" section of this article originated from section 125 of the American Practical Navigator, a document produced by the government of the United States of America.

== See also ==
- Captain John Bury
- General lighthouse authority
- e-Navigation concept
