= Buoy =

Floating structure or device

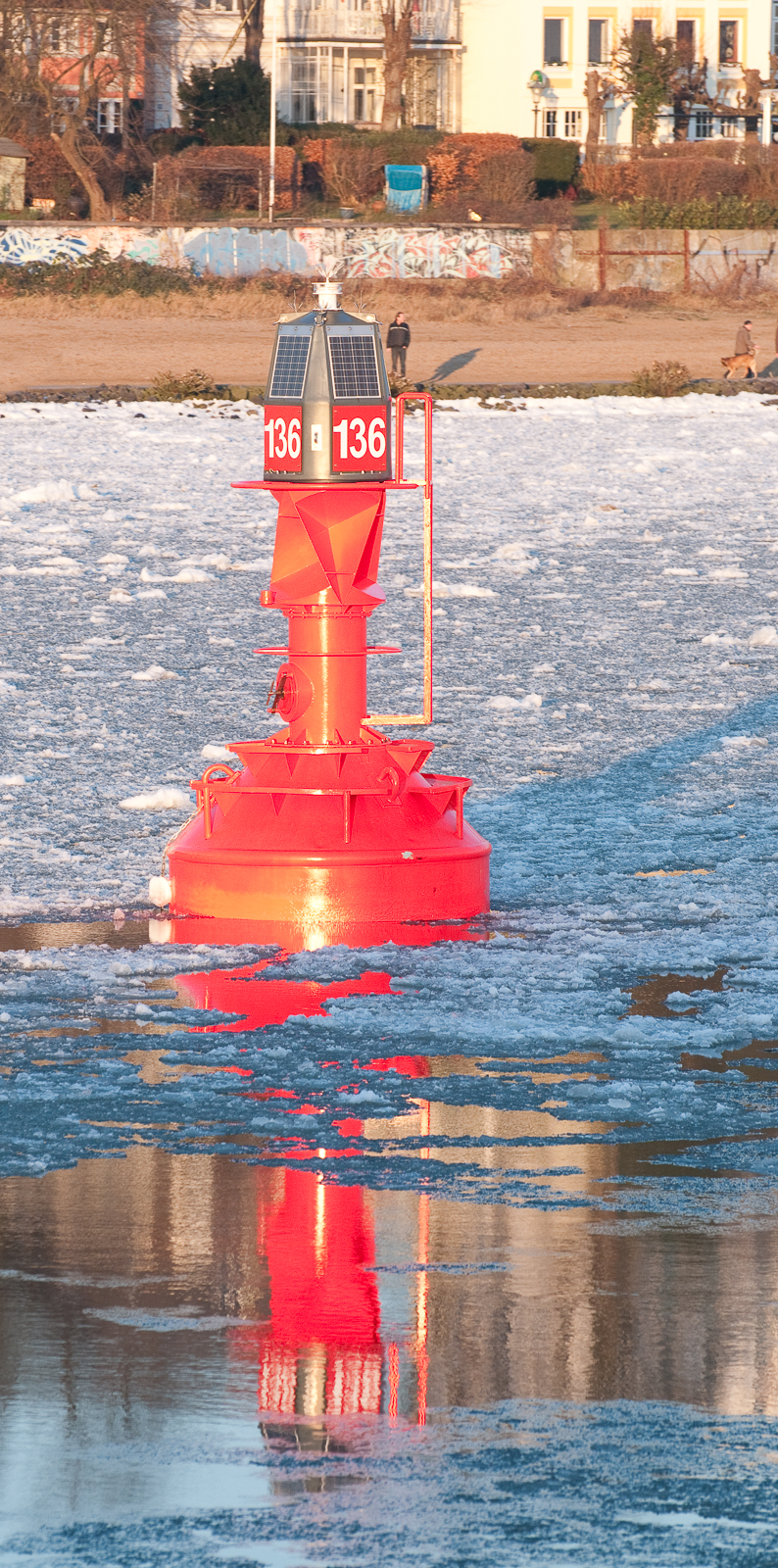
Smart buoy with solar panels, LED light, and corner reflectors for radar

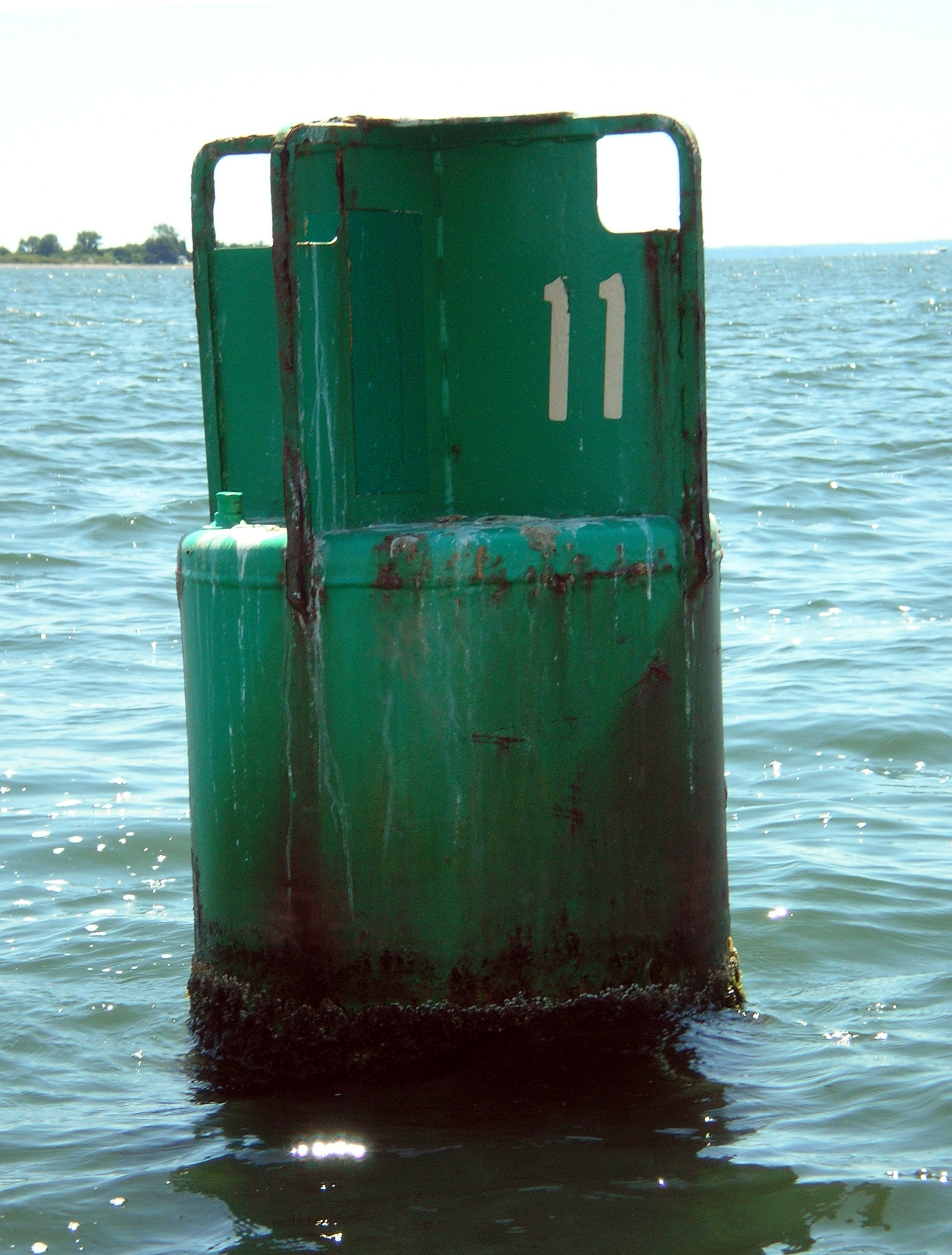
Green can #11 near the mouth of the Saugatuck River (IALA region B).

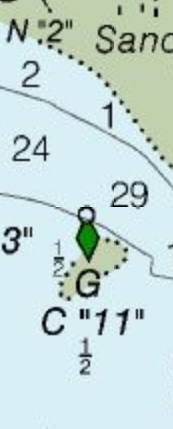
Green Can #11 on a nautical chart

A buoy (/ˈbɔɪ, buː.i/; boy, BOO-ee) is a floating device that can have many purposes. It can be anchored (stationary) or allowed to drift with ocean currents.

== History ==
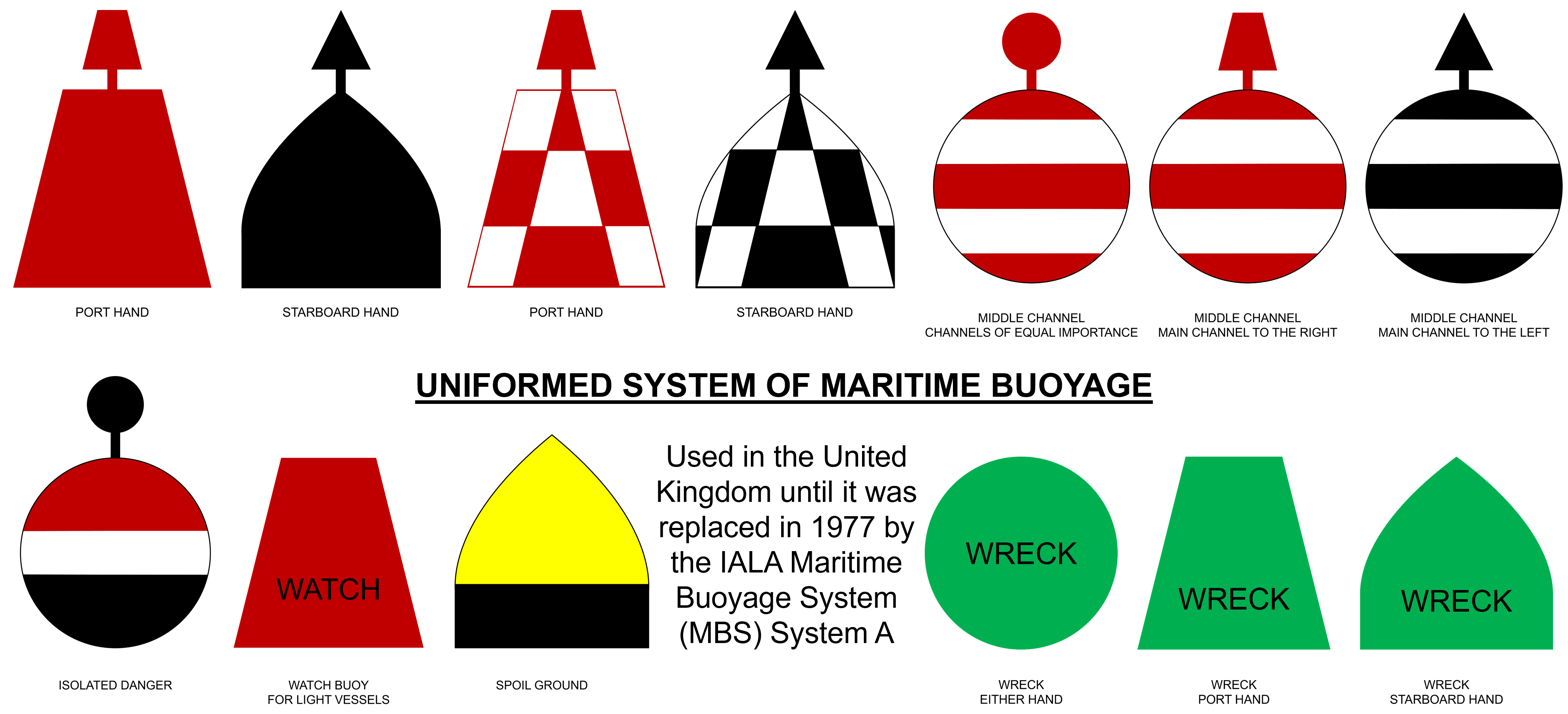
Diagram of Heritage Buoyage used in the United Kingdom before 1977.

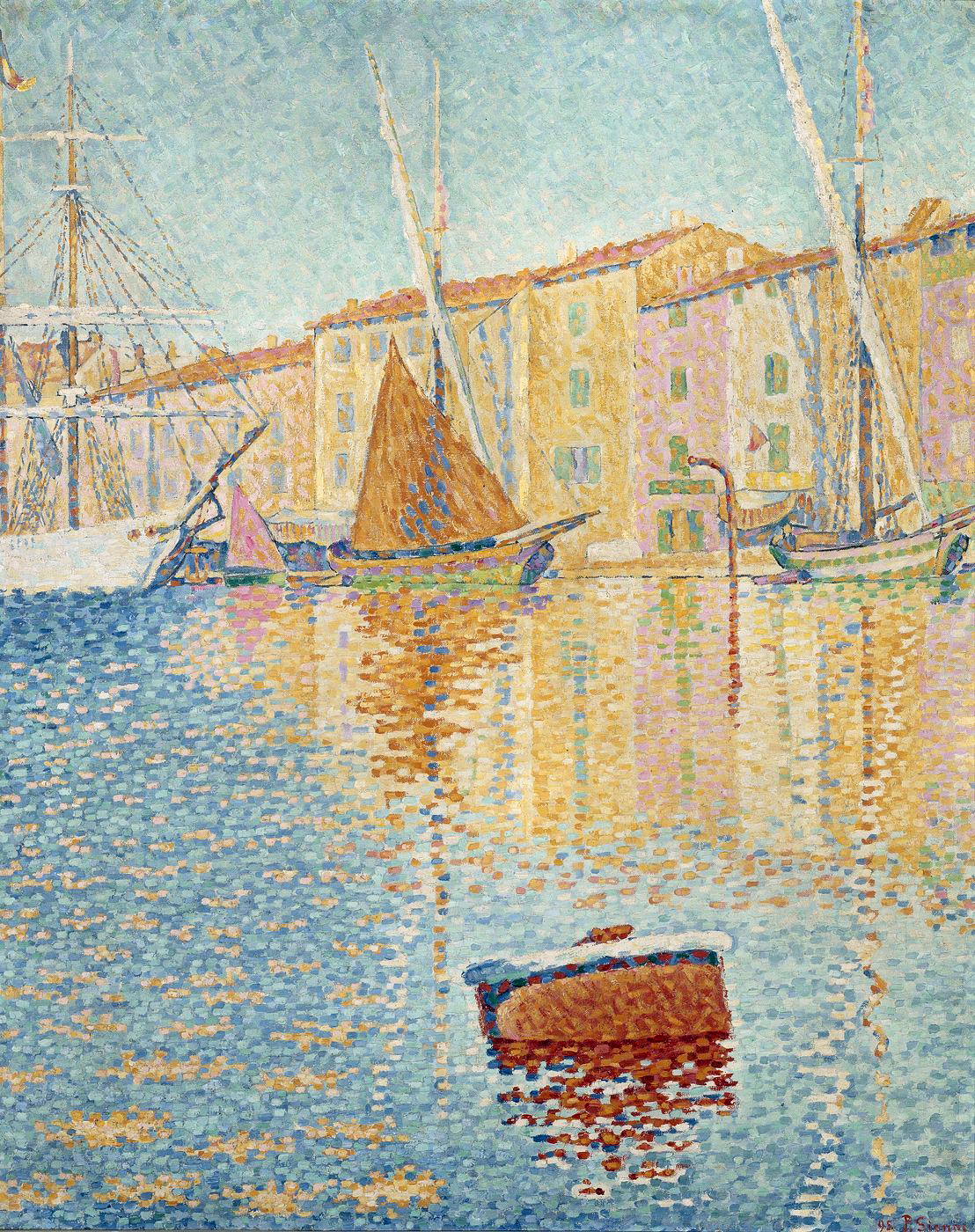
The red buoy (1895), by Paul Signac. The usual red color of the buoys has gained some attention even by artists.

The ultimate origin of buoys is unknown, but by 1295 a seaman's manual referred to navigation buoys in the Guadalquivir River in Spain. To the north there are early medieval mentions of the French / Belgian River Maas being buoyed. Such early buoys were probably just timber beams or rafts, but in 1358 there is a record of a barrel buoy in the Dutch Maasmond (also known as the Maas Sluis or Maasgat). The simple barrel was difficult to secure to the seabed, and so a conical tonne was developed. They had a solid plug at the narrow end through which a mooring ring could be attached. By 1790 the older conical tonne was being replaced by a nun buoy. This had the same conical section below the waterline as the tonne buoy, but at the waterline a barrel shape was used to allow a truncated cone to be above the water. The whole was completed with a top mark. In the nineteenth century iron buoys became available. They had watertight internal bulkheads and as well as topmarks and might have bells* (1860) or whistles* (1880). In 1879 Julius Pintsch obtained a patent for the illumination of buoys by using a compressed gas. This was superseded from 1912 onwards by Gustaf Dalén's acetylene lamp. This could be set to flash which ensured that buoys could be distinguished from ships' lights and from each other. A later development was the sun valve which shut off the gas during sunlight.

*These additions have one obvious value, they work even in low visibility fog conditions, and the whistling buoys, on at least some models, work via the wave action acting as piston in an open-bottomed chamber with a whistle mechanism in fact making more noise the greater the water's hazards, and without any active input like a fog horn

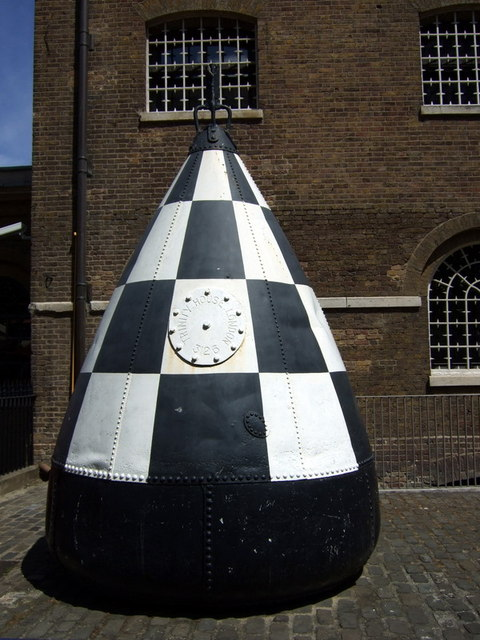
Past design of a Starboard Buoy

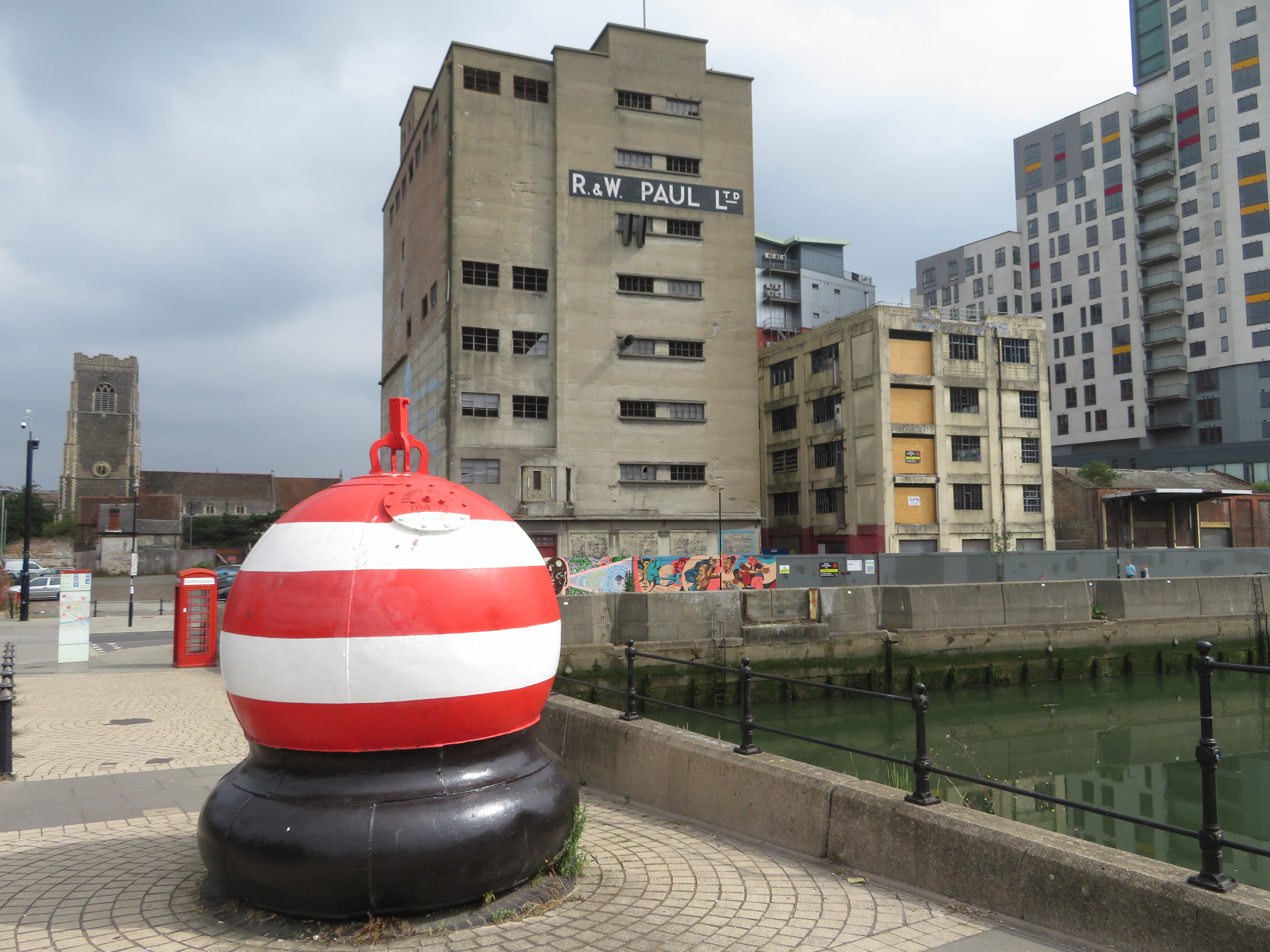
Past design of an Fairway Buoy

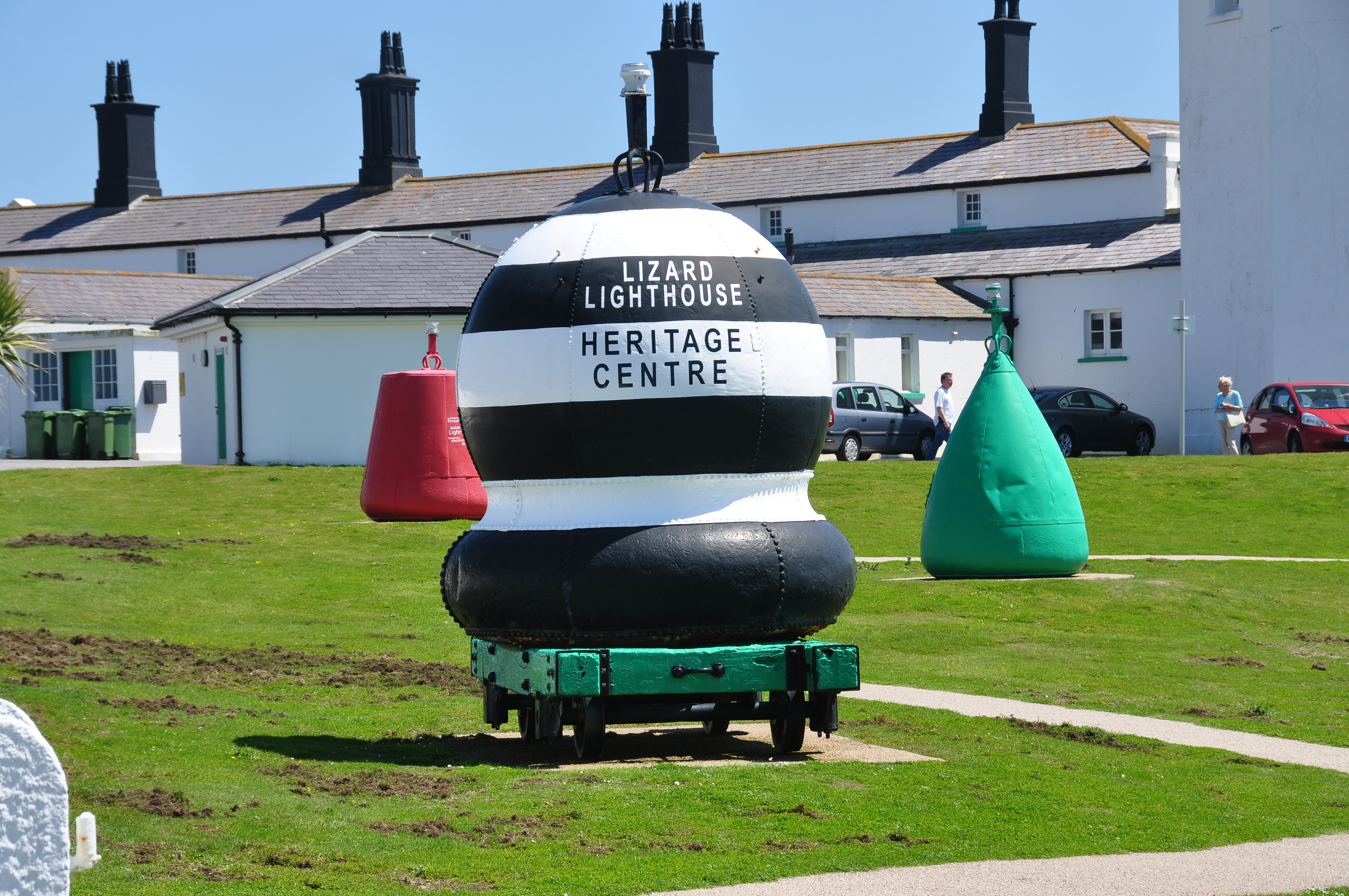
Another past design of an Fairway Buoy

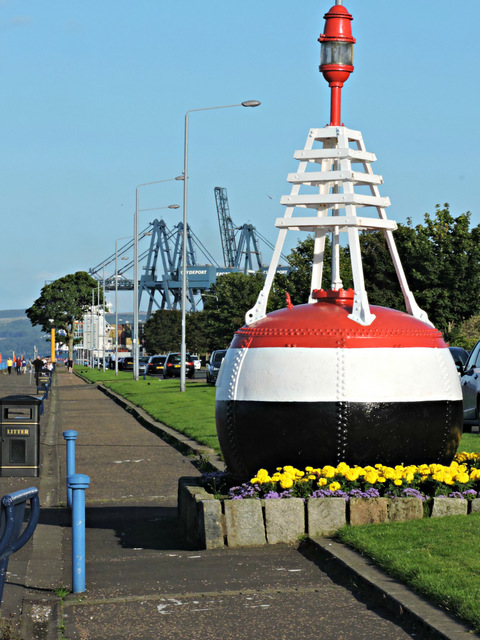
Past design of an Isolated Danger Buoy

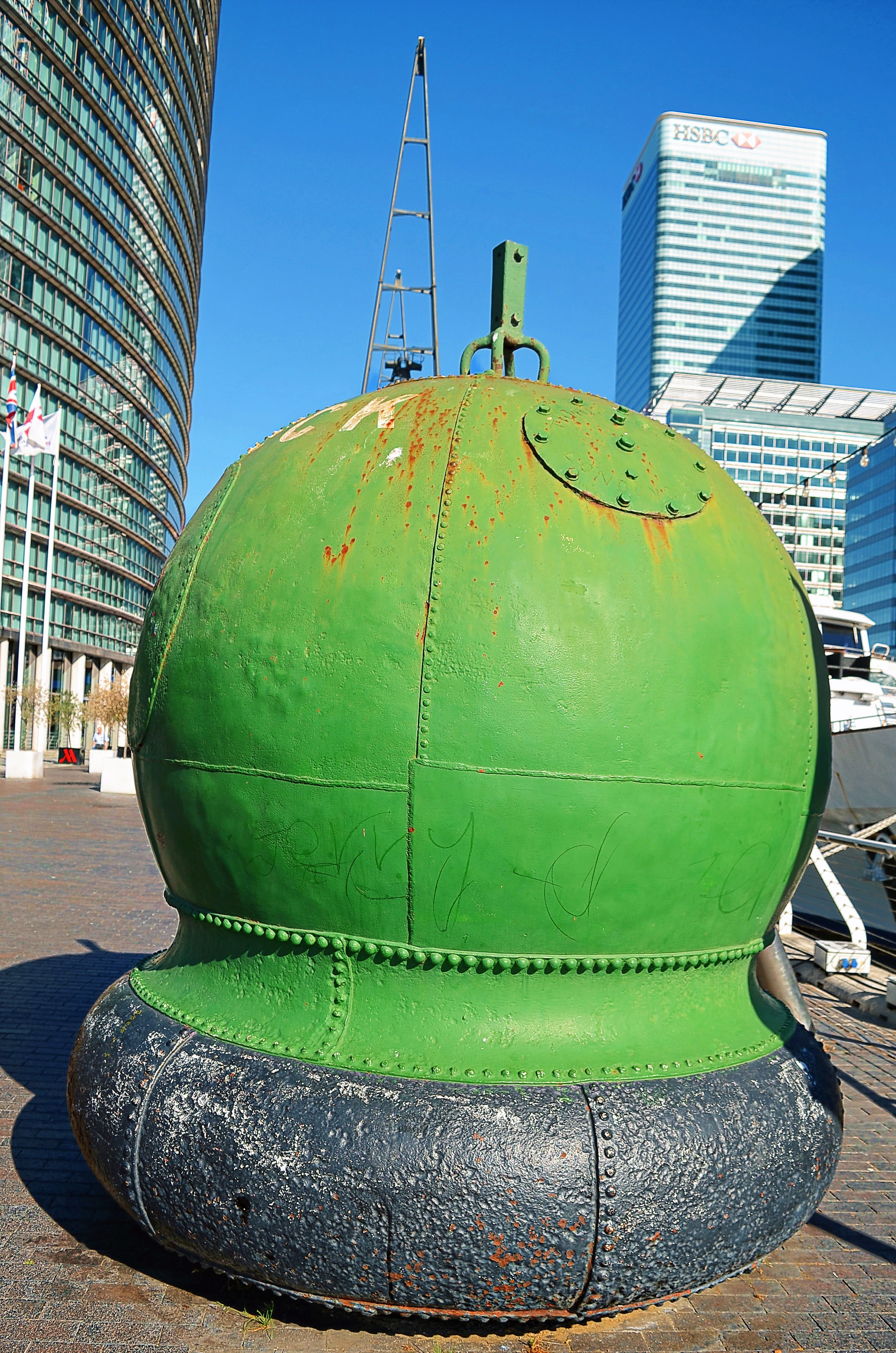
Past design of an Emergency wreck buoy

== Types ==
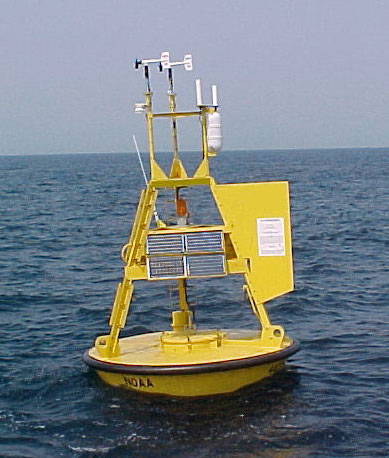
NOAA Weather buoy

=== Navigational buoys ===
- Race course marker buoys are used for buoy racing, the most prevalent form of yacht racing and power boat racing. They delimit the course and must be passed to a specified side. They are also used in underwater orienteering competitions.
- Emergency wreck buoys provide a clear and unambiguous means of temporarily marking new wrecks, typically for the first 24–72 hours. They are coloured in an equal number of blue and yellow vertical stripes and fitted with an alternating blue and yellow flashing light. They were implemented following collisions in the Dover Strait in 2002 when vessels struck the new wreck of the MV Tricolor.
- Ice marking buoys mark holes in frozen lakes and rivers so snowmobiles do not drive over the holes.
- Isolated danger mark – Sea mark indicating a danger spot
- Large Navigational Buoys (LNB, or Lanby buoys) are automatic buoys over 10 meters high equipped with a powerful light monitored electronically as a replacement for a lightvessel. They may be marked on charts as a "Superbuoy."
- Lateral marker buoys
- Safe water mark, fairway buoys, or outer buoys mark the entrance to a channel or nearby landfall
- Sea marks aid pilotage by marking a maritime channel, hazard or administrative area to allow boats and ships to navigate safely. Some are fitted with wave-activated bells or gongs.
- Wreck buoys mark a wrecked ship to warn other ships to keep away because of unseen hazards.

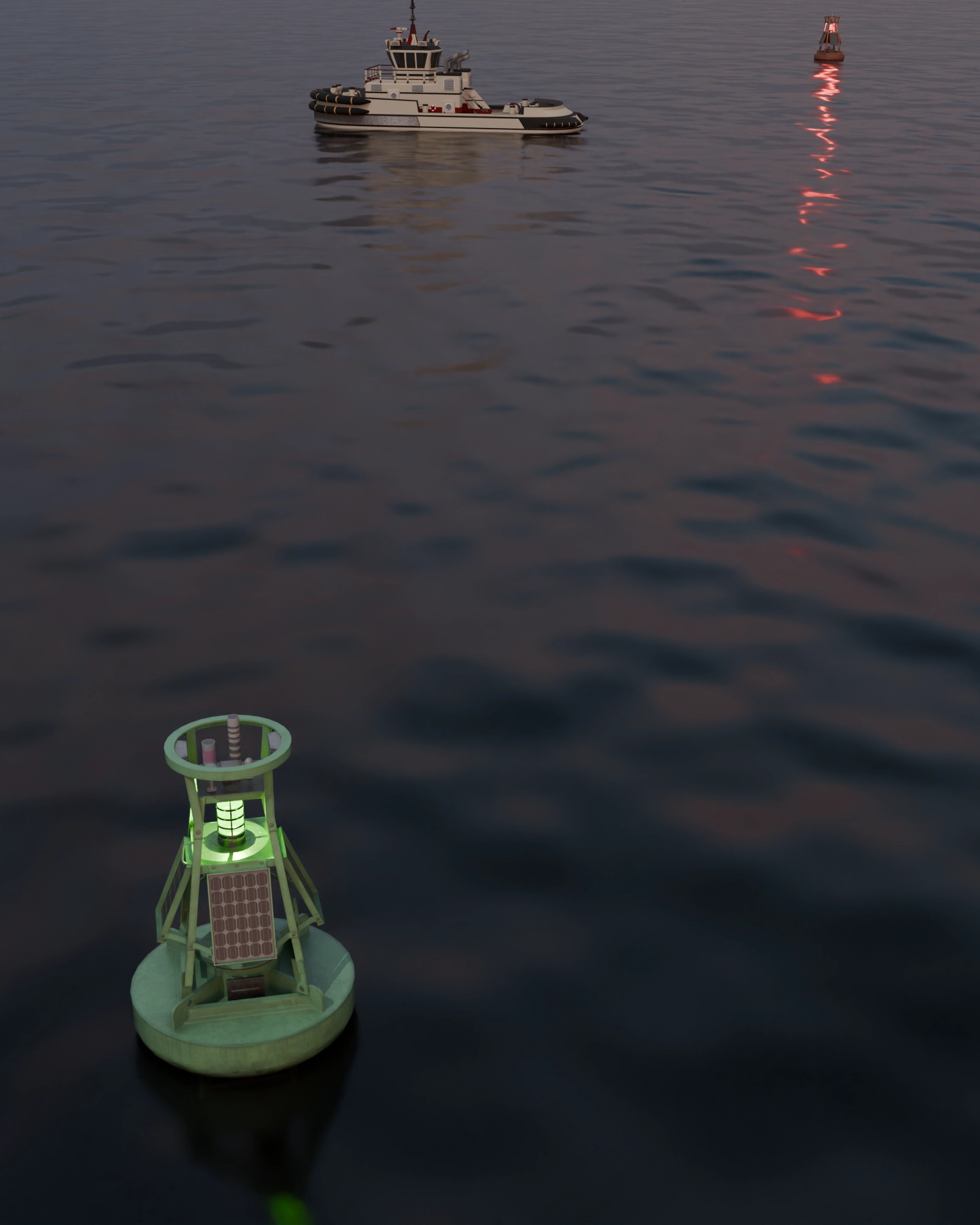
3D design of red and green LED navigation buoys with solar panels

- Light buoys provide demarcation at night.

=== Marker buoys ===
Buoys are often used to temporarily or permanently mark the positions of underwater objects:

- Lobster trap buoys are brightly colored buoys marking lobster trap locations so lobster fishers can find their lobster traps. Each fisher has a unique colour marking or registration number. They are allowed to haul only their own traps, and must display their buoy colour or license number on their boat so law enforcement officials know what they should be hauling. The buoys are brightly coloured with highly visible numbers so they can be seen in poor visibility conditions like rain, fog and sea smoke.
- Fishing floats are a type of lightweight buoys used in angling to mark the position of the baited hook suspended underneath, and as a bite indicator to signal the angler any changes in the hook's underwater status.

==== Diving ====
Several types of marker buoys may be used by divers:

- Decompression buoys are deployed by submerged SCUBA divers to mark their position underwater whilst doing decompression stops
- Shot buoys mark dive sites for the boat safety cover of scuba divers so they can descend to dive sites more easily in conditions of low visibility or tidal currents and more safely do decompression stops on their ascents.
- Surface marker buoys are taken on dives by scuba divers to mark their positions underwater.
- Dive site demarcation buoys indicate that divers are working in the marked area, to warn passing vessels to stay clear.

=== Rescue ===
- Lifebuoys are lifesaving buoys thrown to people in the water to provide buoyancy. They usually have a connected line allowing them to be pulled in.
- Self-locating datum marker buoys (SLDMB) are 70% scale Coastal Ocean Dynamics Experiment (CODE)/Davis-style oceanographic surface drifters with drogue vanes between 30 and 100 cm deep, designed for deployment from U.S. Coast Guard vessels or airframes for search and rescue. They have very little surface area above water to minimize the effects of wind and waves on them.
- Submarine rescue buoys are released in emergencies and for communication purposes.

=== Research ===
- Profiling buoys are specialized buoys that adjust their buoyancy to sink at a controlled rate to a set depth, for example 2,000 metres while measuring sea temperature and salinity. After a certain period, typically 10 days, they return to the surface, transmit their data via satellite, then sink again. See Argo (oceanography).
- Tsunami buoys are anchored buoys that can detect sudden changes in undersea water pressure, and are a component of tsunami warning systems in the Pacific Tsunami Warning Center and Indian Oceans.
- Wave buoys measure the movement of the water surface as a wave train. The data they transmit is analysed to form statistics like significant wave height and period, and wave direction.
- Weather buoys measure weather parameters such as air temperature, barometric pressure, and wind speed and direction. They transmit this data, via satellite radio links such as the purpose-built Argos System or commercial satellite phone networks, to meteorological centres for forecasting and climate study. They may be anchored (moored buoys), or allowed to drift (drifting buoys) in the open currents. Their position is calculated by the satellite. They are also referred to as Ocean Data Acquisition Systems, or (ODAS) buoys. and may be marked on charts as "Superbuoys."

=== Mooring ===
- Mooring buoys keep one end of a mooring cable or chain on the water's surface so ships and boats can tie to them. Many marinas mark them with numbers and assign them to particular vessels, or rent them to transient vessels. This method of anchoring is intended for permanent placement or long-interval use.
- Tripping buoys are used to keep one end of a 'tripping line' to be used to break out and lift an anchor on the water's surface so that a stuck anchor can more easily be freed.

=== Military ===
- Marker buoys, used in naval warfare (particularly anti-submarine warfare) emit light and/or smoke using pyrotechnic devices to create the flare and smoke. Commonly 3 inches (76 mm) in diameter and about 20 inches (500 mm) long, they are activated by contact with seawater and float on the surface. Some extinguish themselves after a specific period, while others are sunk when they are no longer needed.
- Sonobuoys are used by anti-submarine warfare aircraft to detect submarines by SONAR.
- Target buoys simulate targets, such as small boats, in live-fire exercises by naval and coastal forces. They are usually targeted by medium-sized weapons such as heavy machine guns, rapid fire cannons (~20 mm), autocannons (up to 40–57 mm) and anti-tank rockets.

=== Specific forms ===
- DAN buoys are used as:
  - Large maritime navigational aids providing a platform for light and radio beacons
  - Lifebuoys with flags, used on yachts and smaller pleasure craft
  - Temporary markers in Danish seine fishing to mark net anchor positions
  - Temporary markers set by danlayers during minesweeping operations to indicate the boundaries of swept paths, swept areas, known hazards, and other locations or reference points
  - Temporary markers for rescue operations
- Spar buoys are tall, thin buoys that float upright, e.g. R/P FLIP

=== Other ===
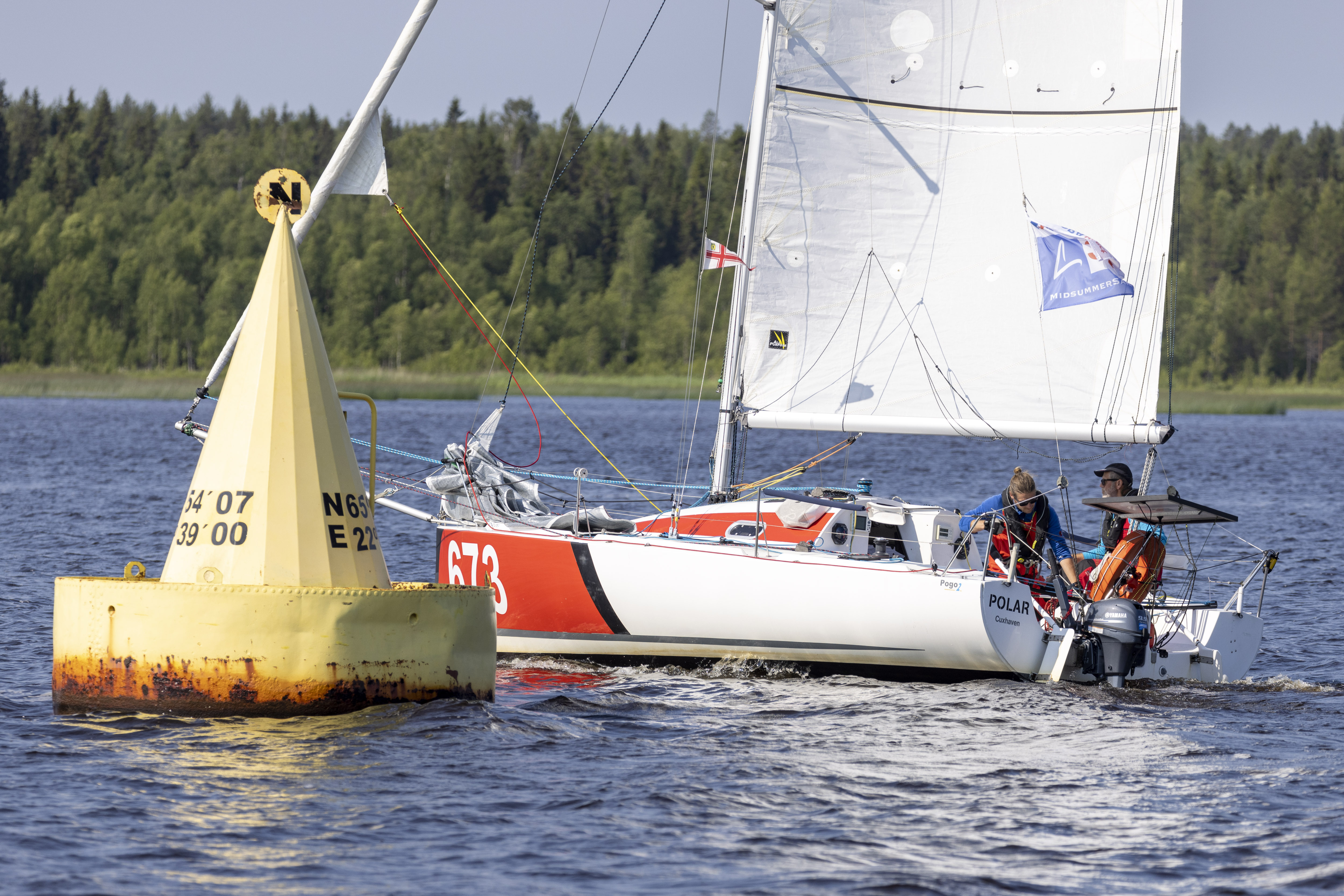
Buoy with letter box in Töre

- Letter boxes on buoys exist in Töre (Sweden) and at the Steinhuder Meer (Germany)

=== Fictional ===
- Imaginary "Mail buoys" have been used as a prank in the US Navy when a new sailor may be given the task of locating one to retrieve non-existent mail.
- Space buoys, a feature in some science fiction stories which are stationary objects in outer space that provide navigation data or warnings.

== Other uses ==
- The word "buoyed" can also be used figuratively. For example, a person can buoy up ('lift up') someone's spirits by providing help and empathy.
- Buoys are used in some wave power systems to generate electrical power.
- George A. Stephen, founder of Weber-Stephen Products Co., invented the kettle grill by cutting a metal buoy in half and fashioning a dome shaped grill to it with a rounded lid.

== Gallery ==
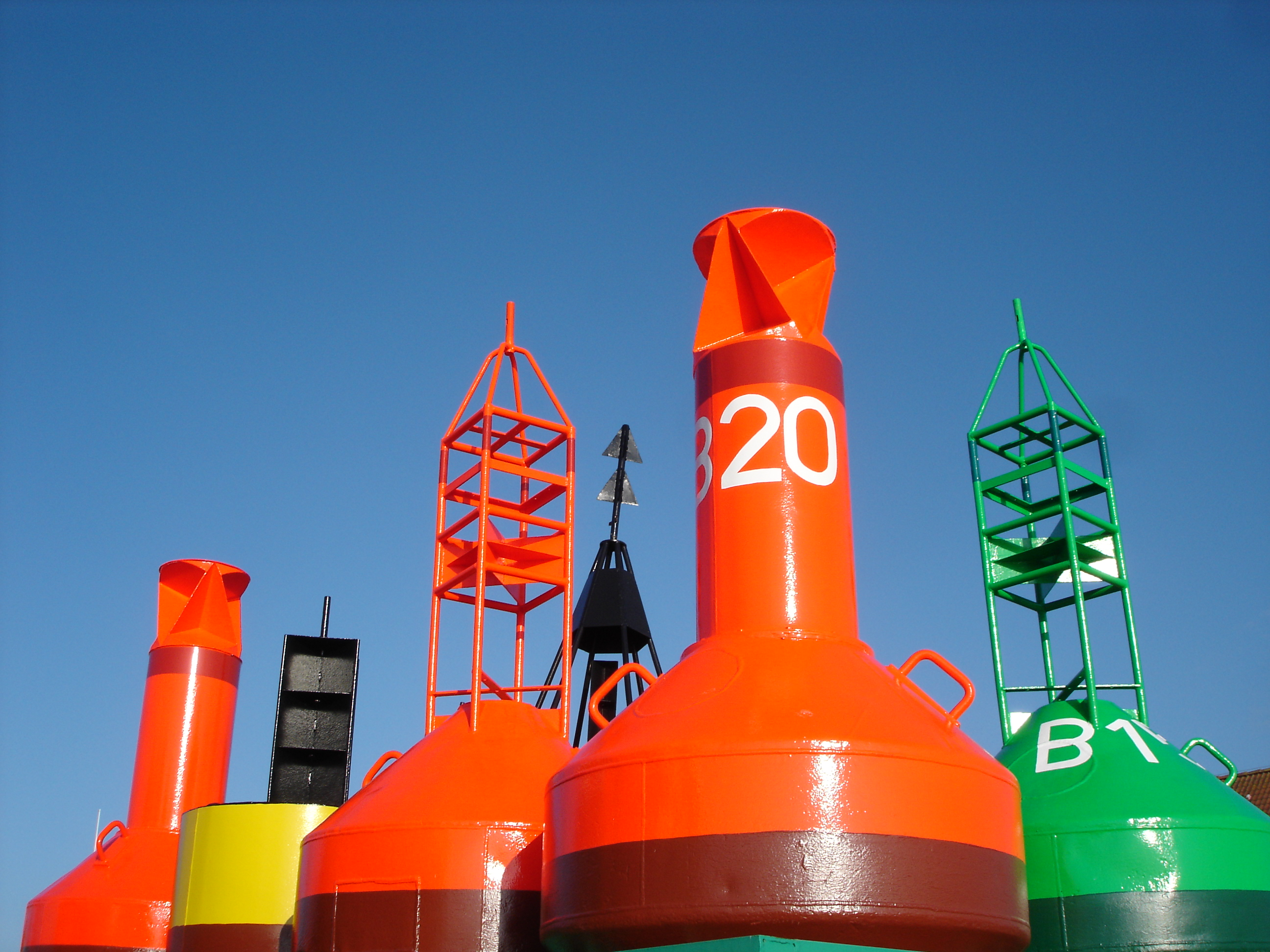
Several different buoys at a storage depot.

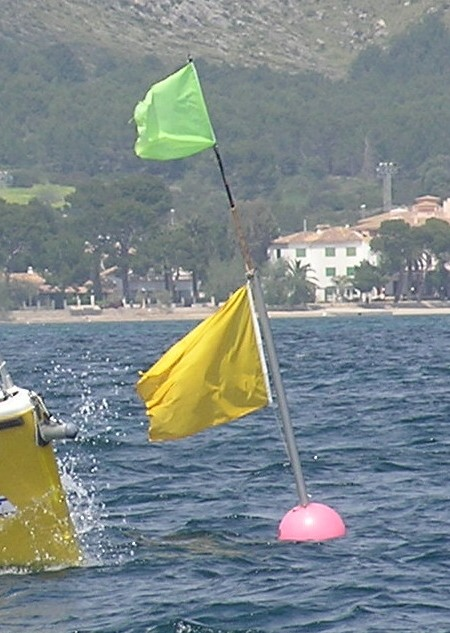
A buoy used as turn marker for sailing races.

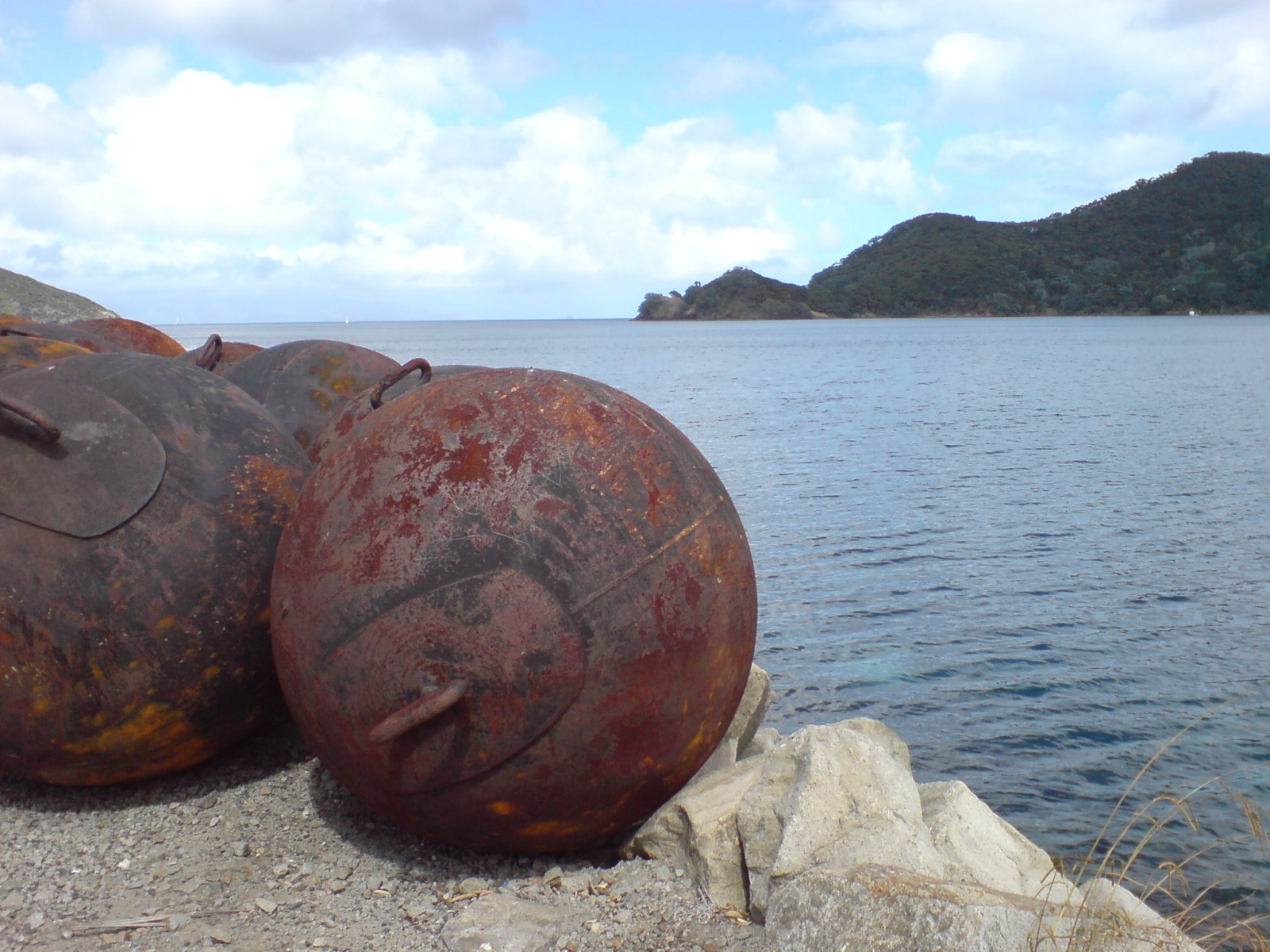
Old iron buoys, most likely for mooring.

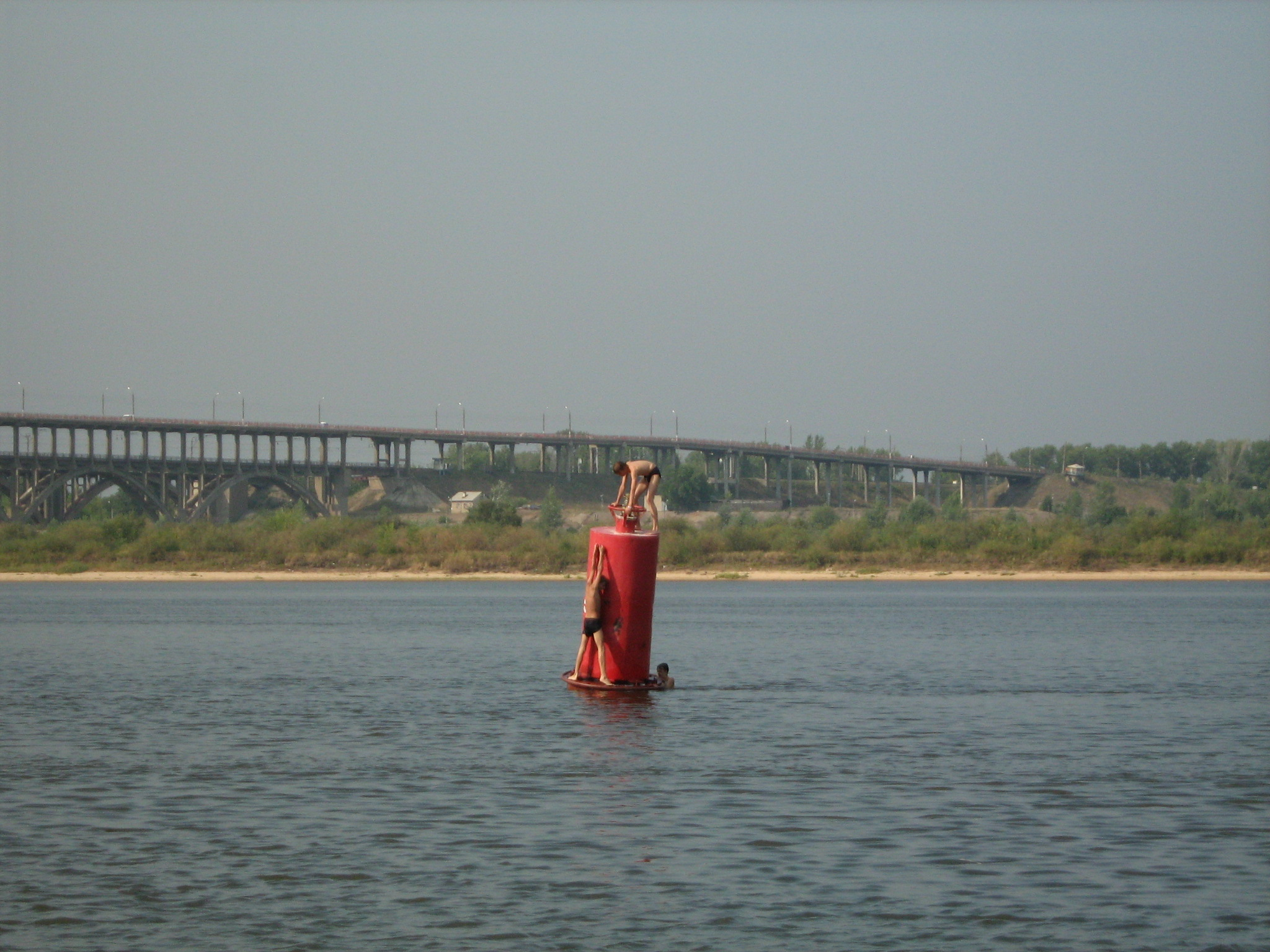
Children playing on a buoy in the Volga

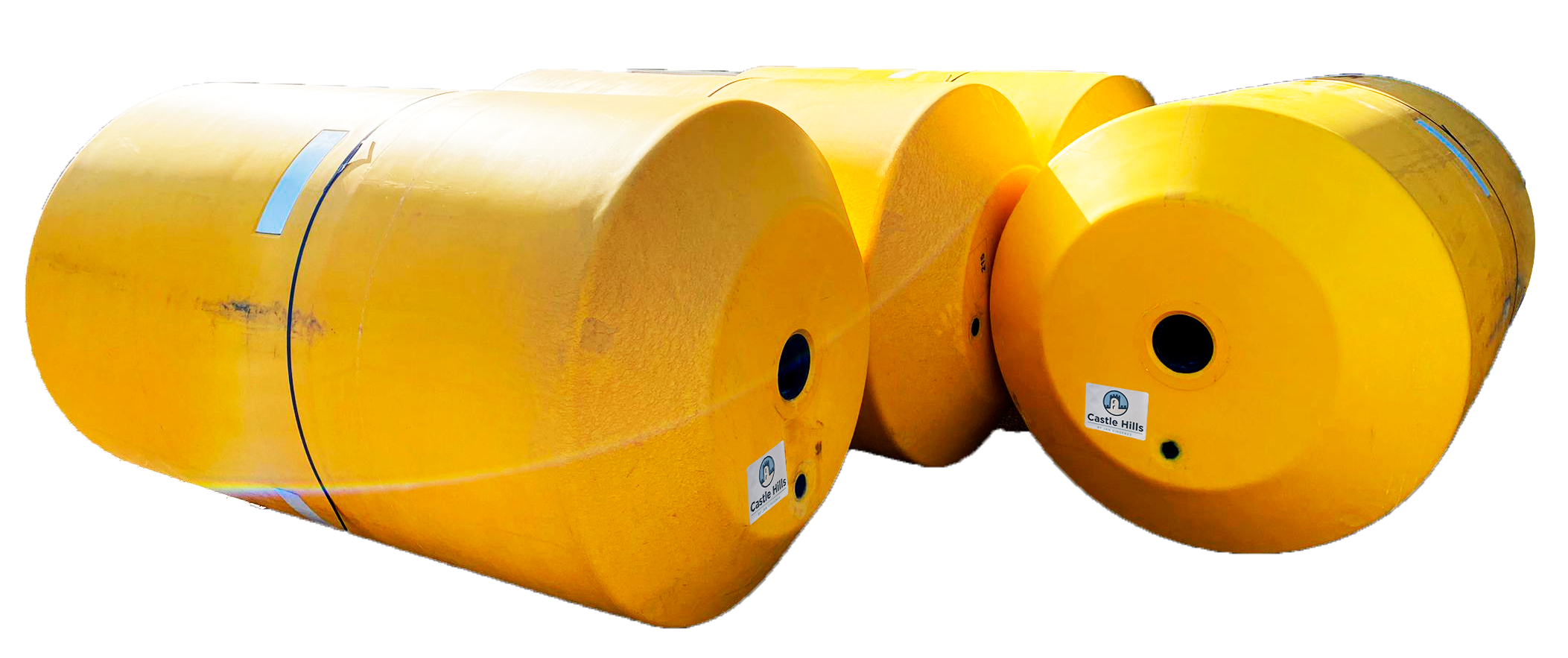
Recycled surface buoys

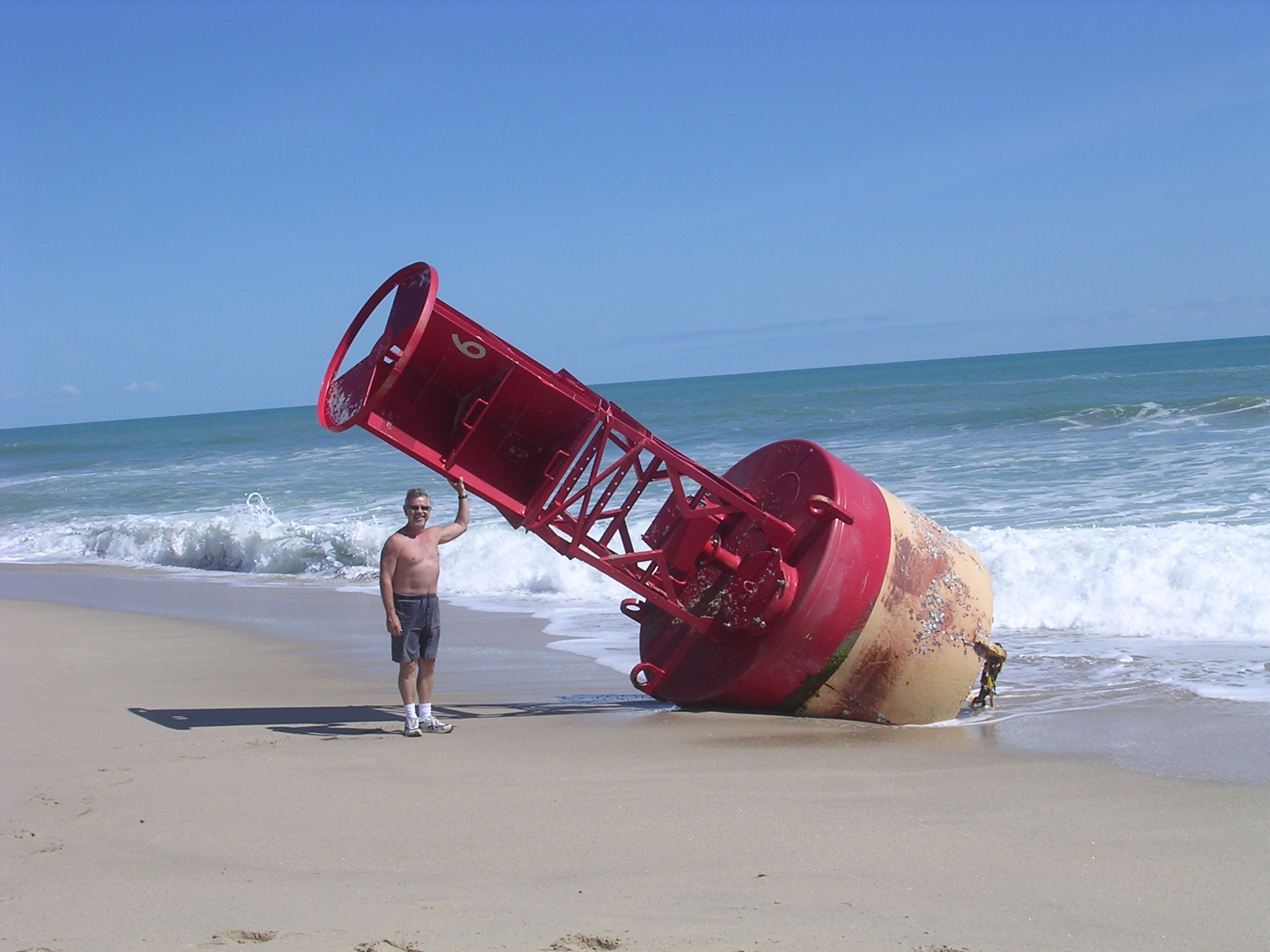
A buoy beached at Sebastian Inlet State Park.

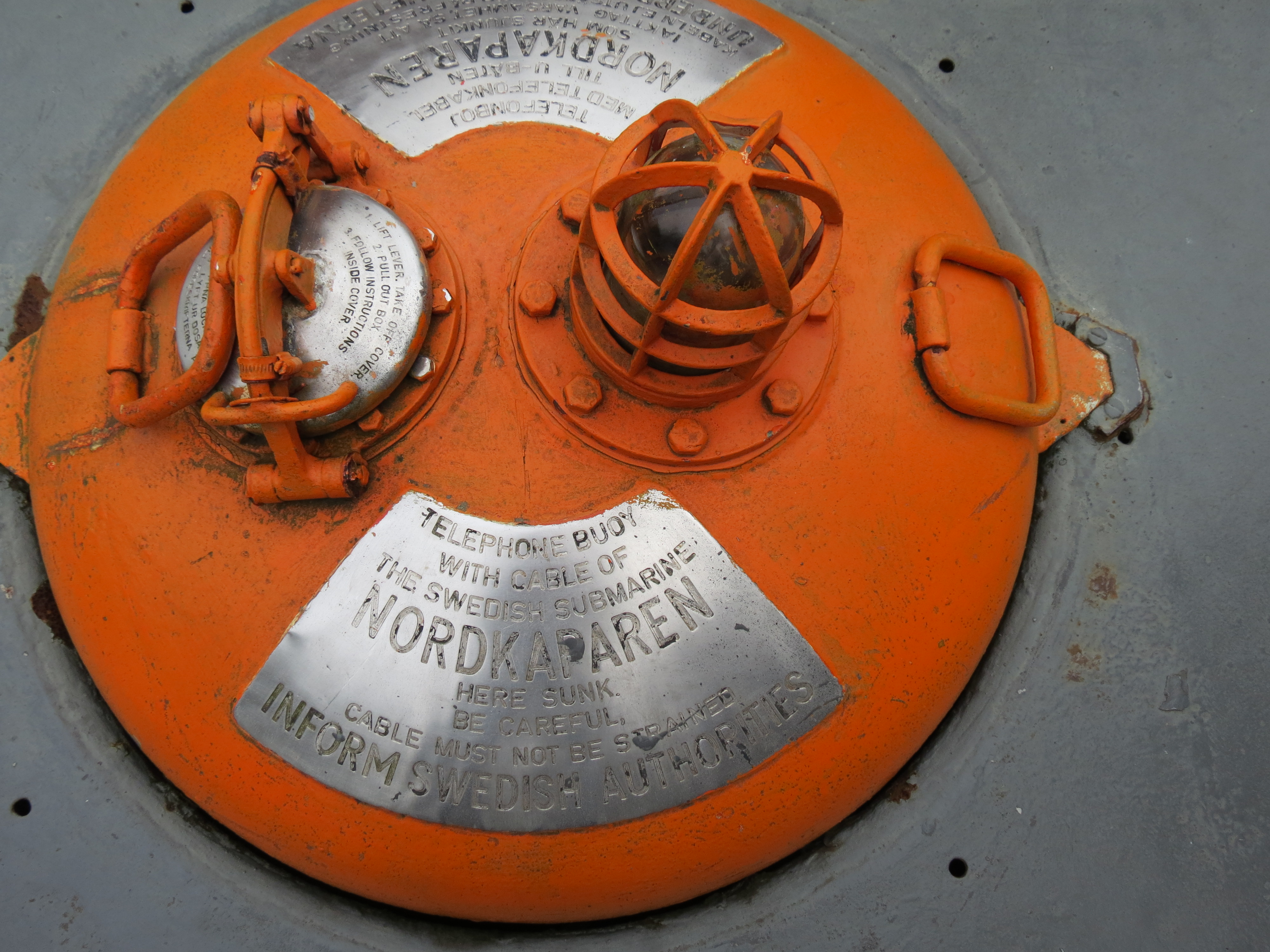
Emergency buoy of the Swedish submarine Nordkaparen

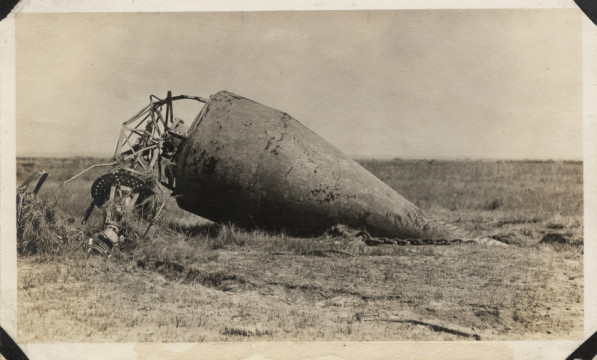
Gas buoy stranded on land after 1915 Galveston Hurricane, near Texas City, Texas

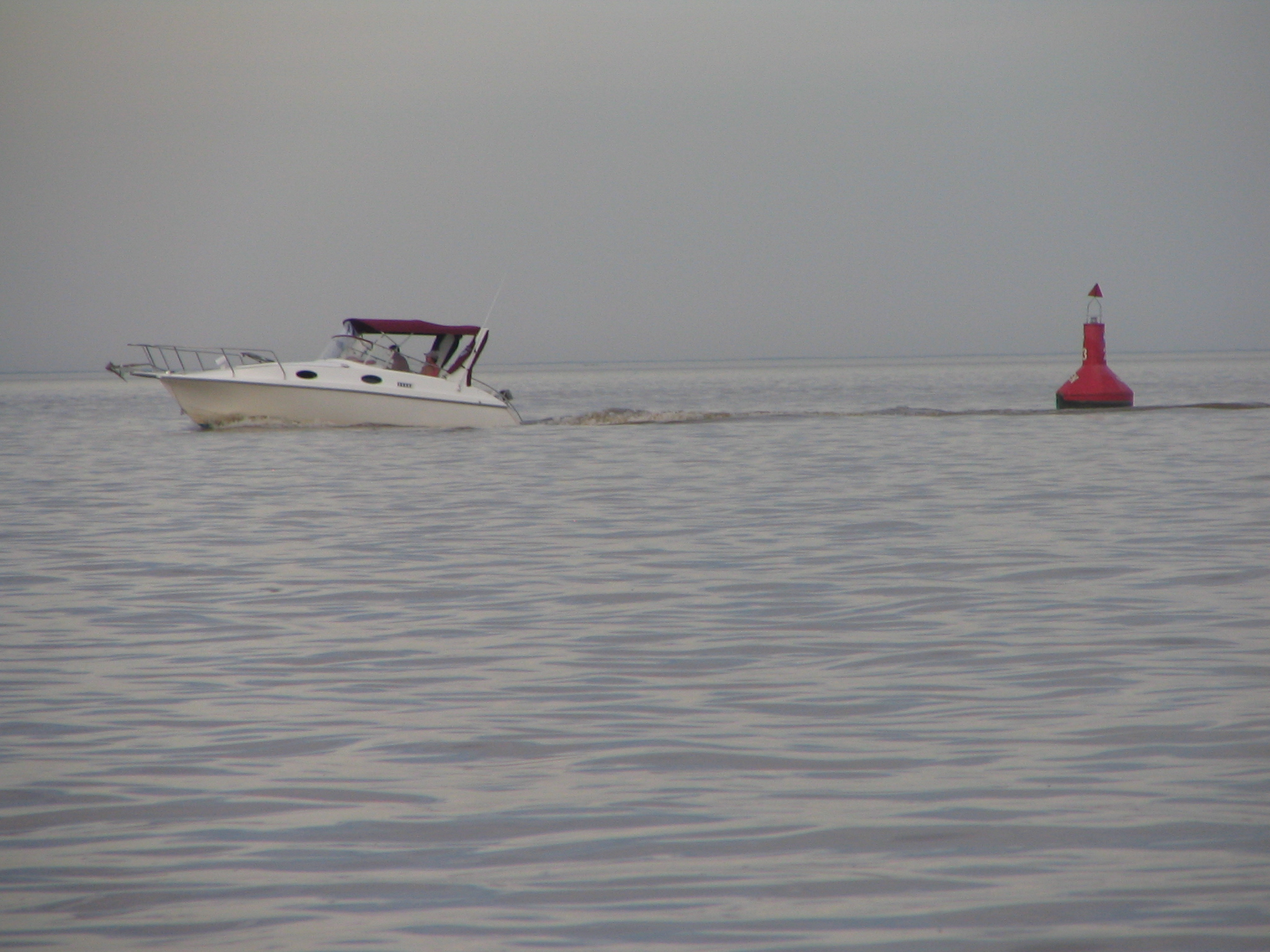
Starboard lateral Buoy (Lateral mark - Region B - IALA ) as Channel Marker Buoy at "Río de la Plata" river, Buenos Aires, Argentina

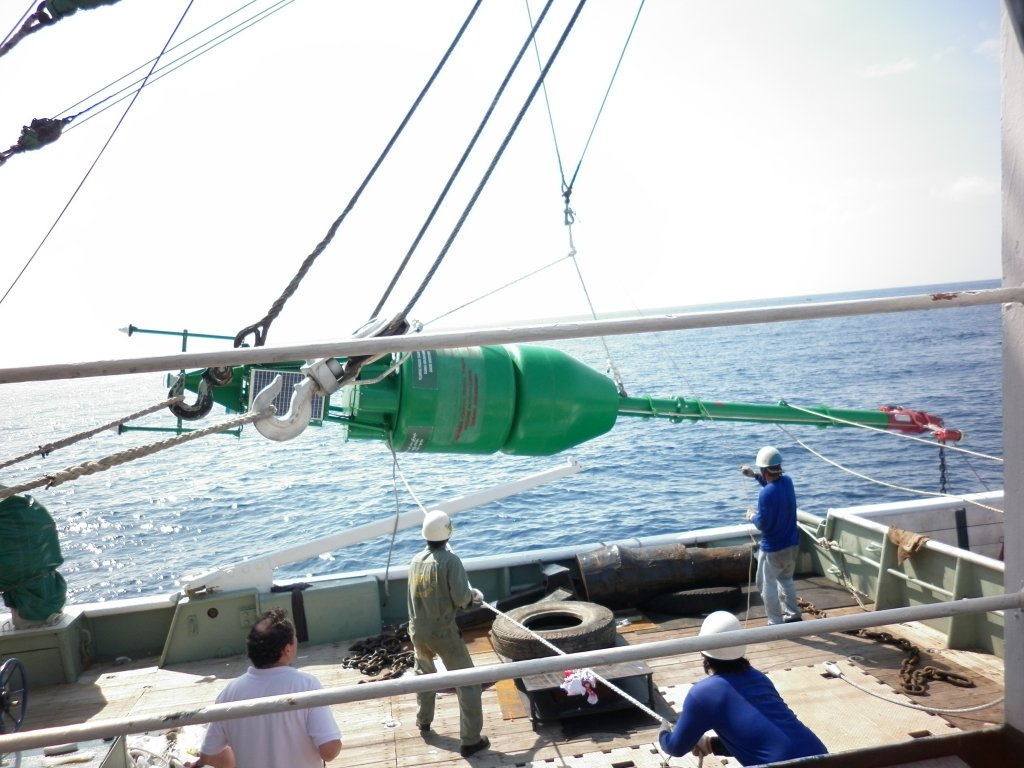
Tsunami buoy before deployment in Andaman Sea

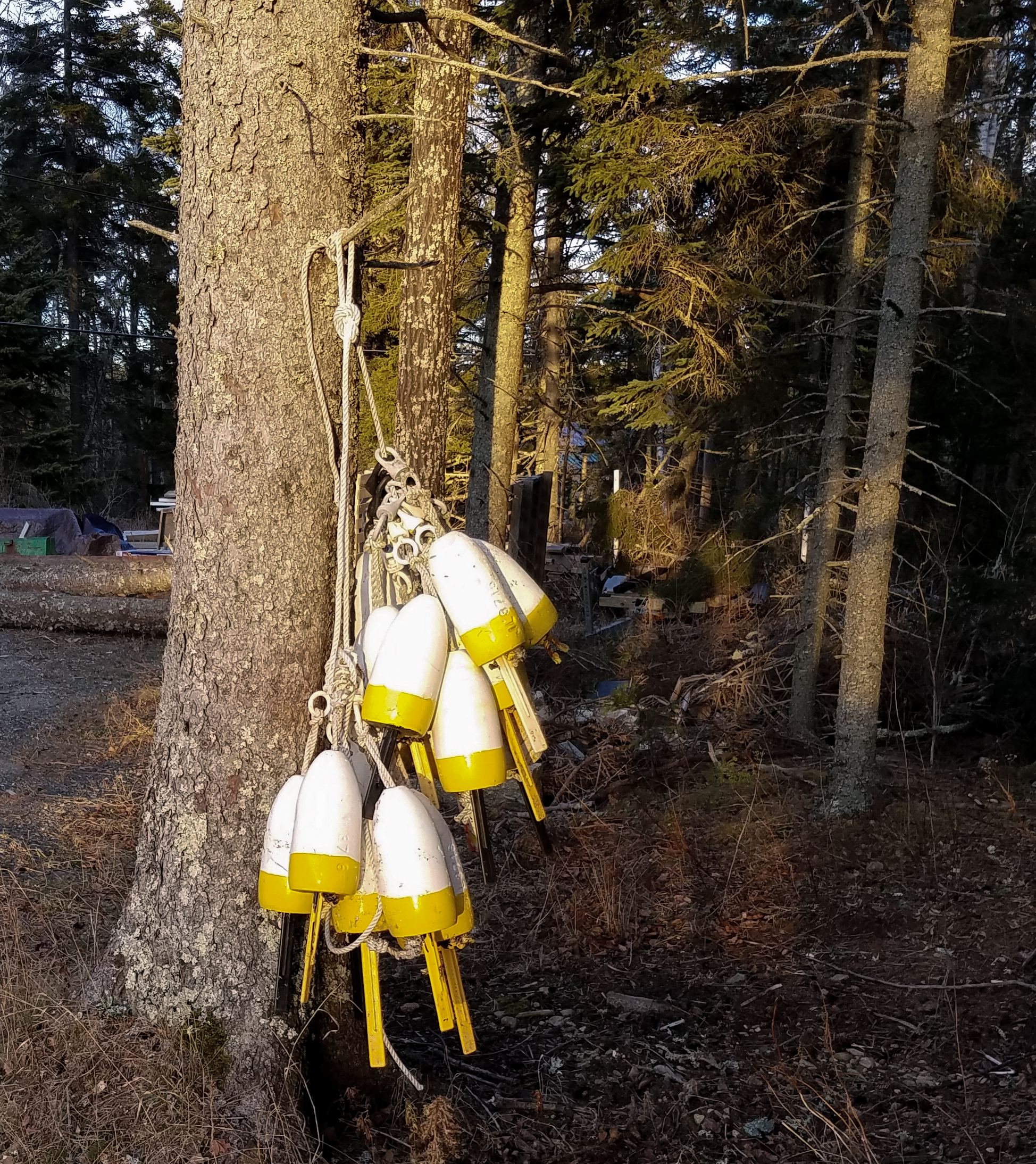
Lobster buoys hanging on a tree, Sprucehead Island, Maine, United States

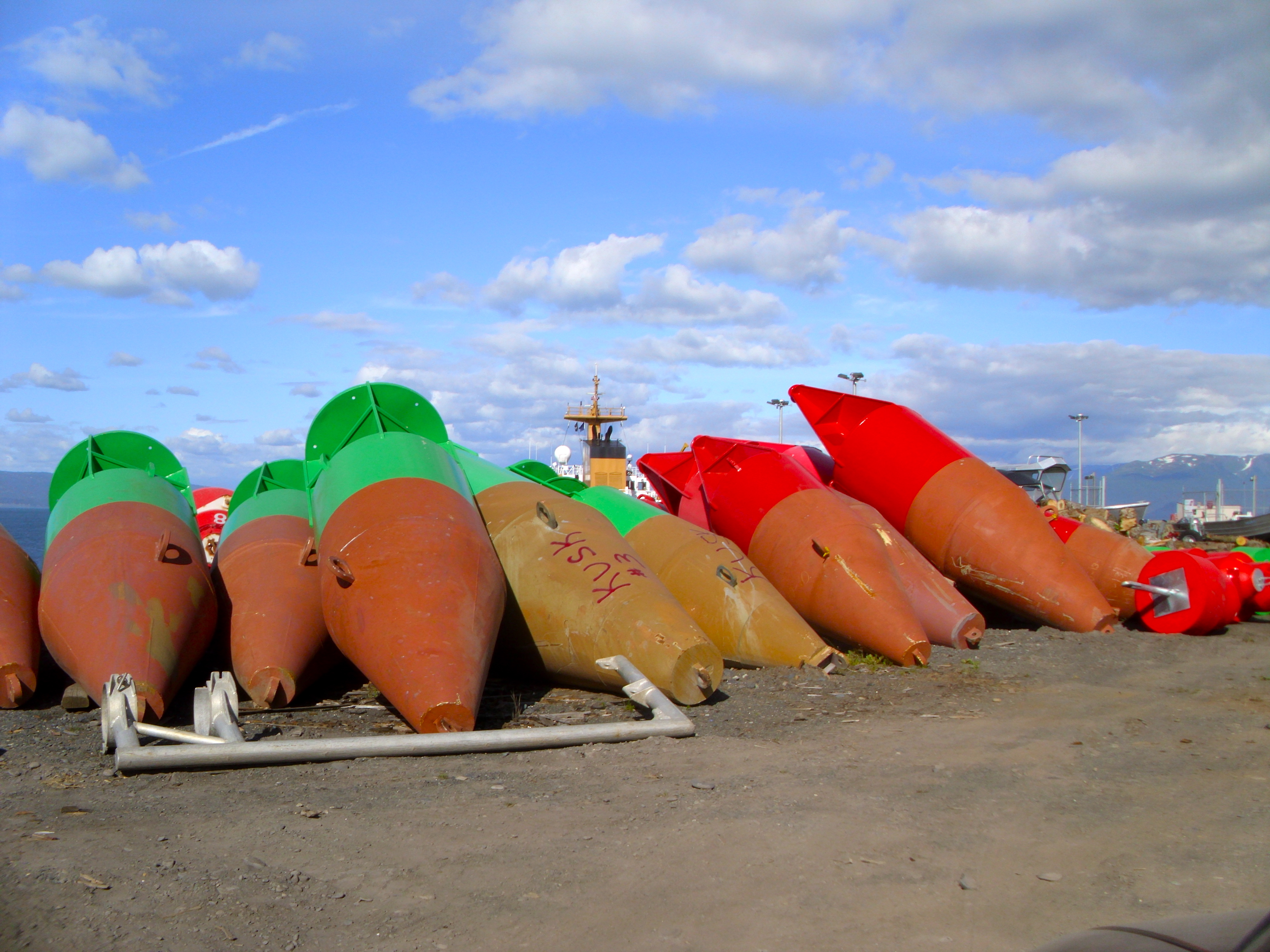
Buoys in dry storage, Homer, Alaska

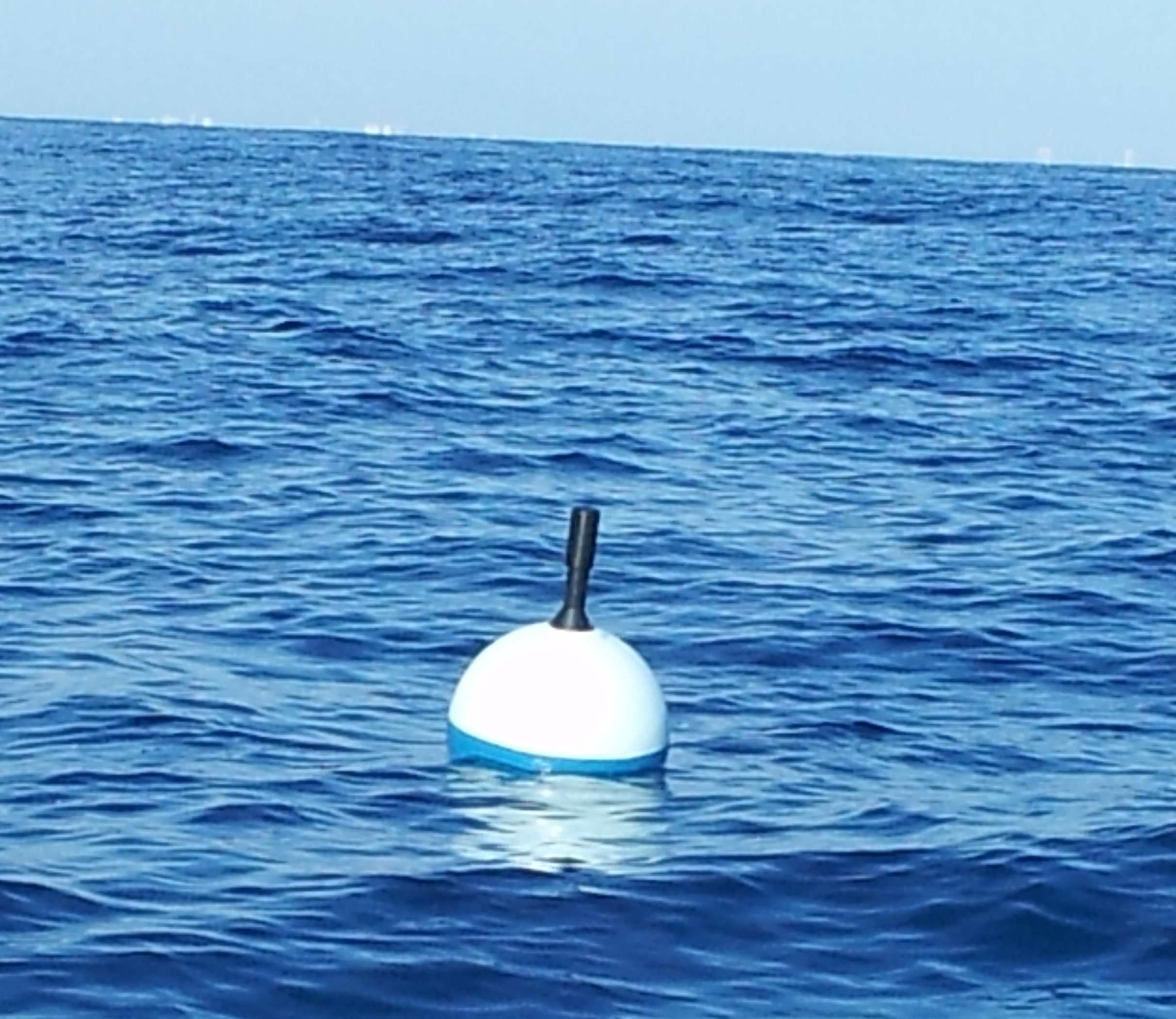
Drifting Buoy fitted with a Barometer

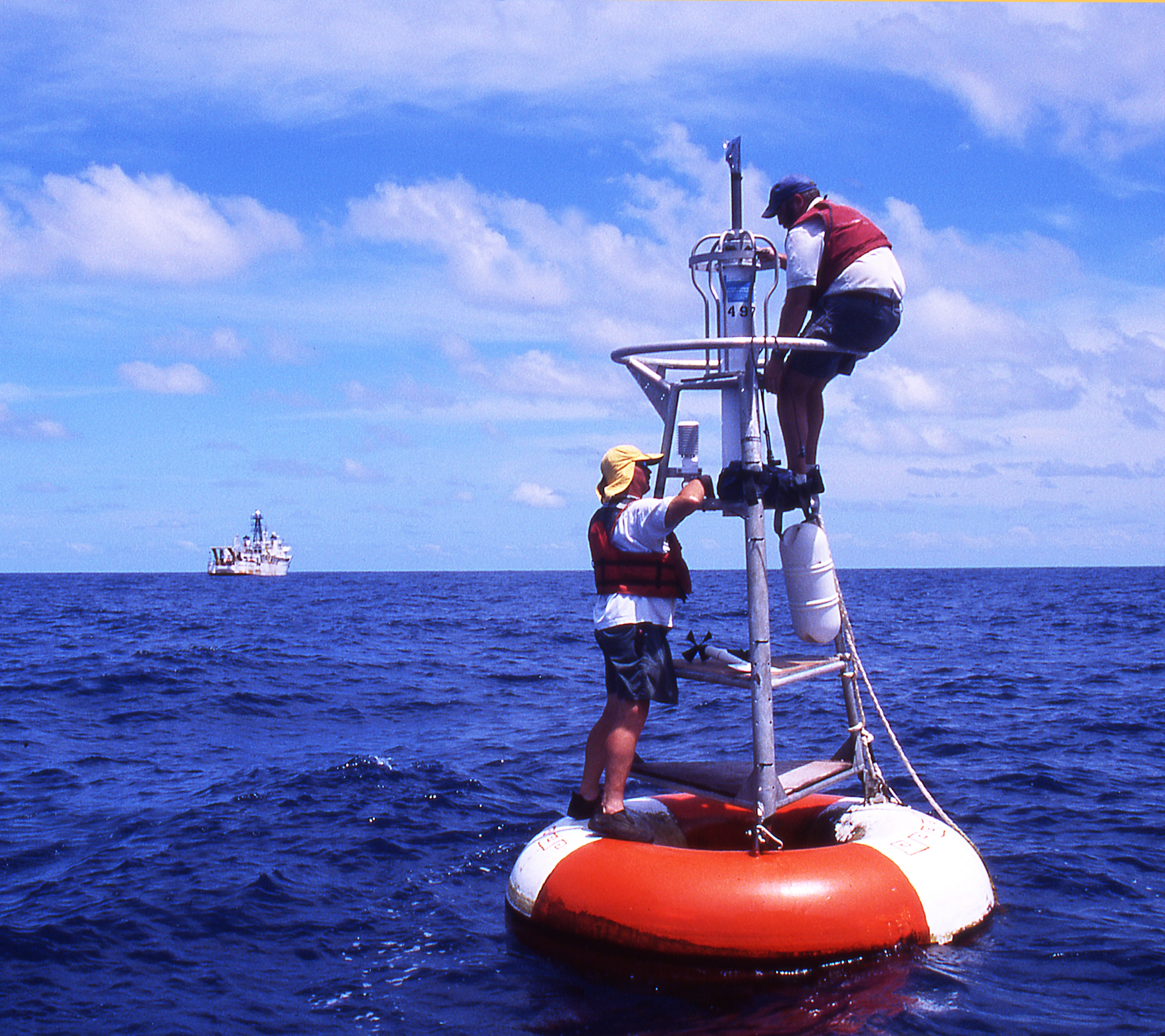
Buoy undergoing repair

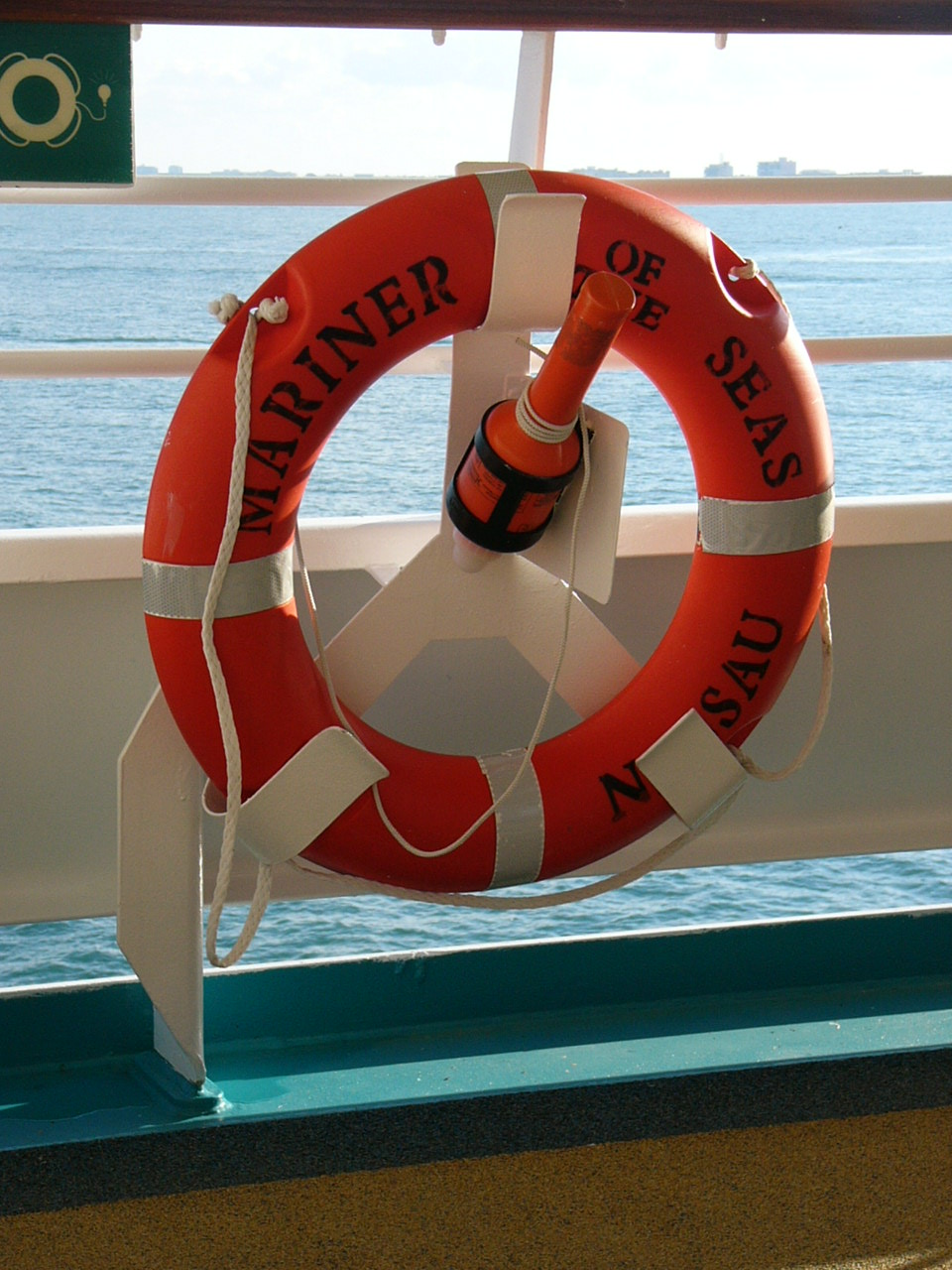
Ring life buoy with a light on a cruise ship

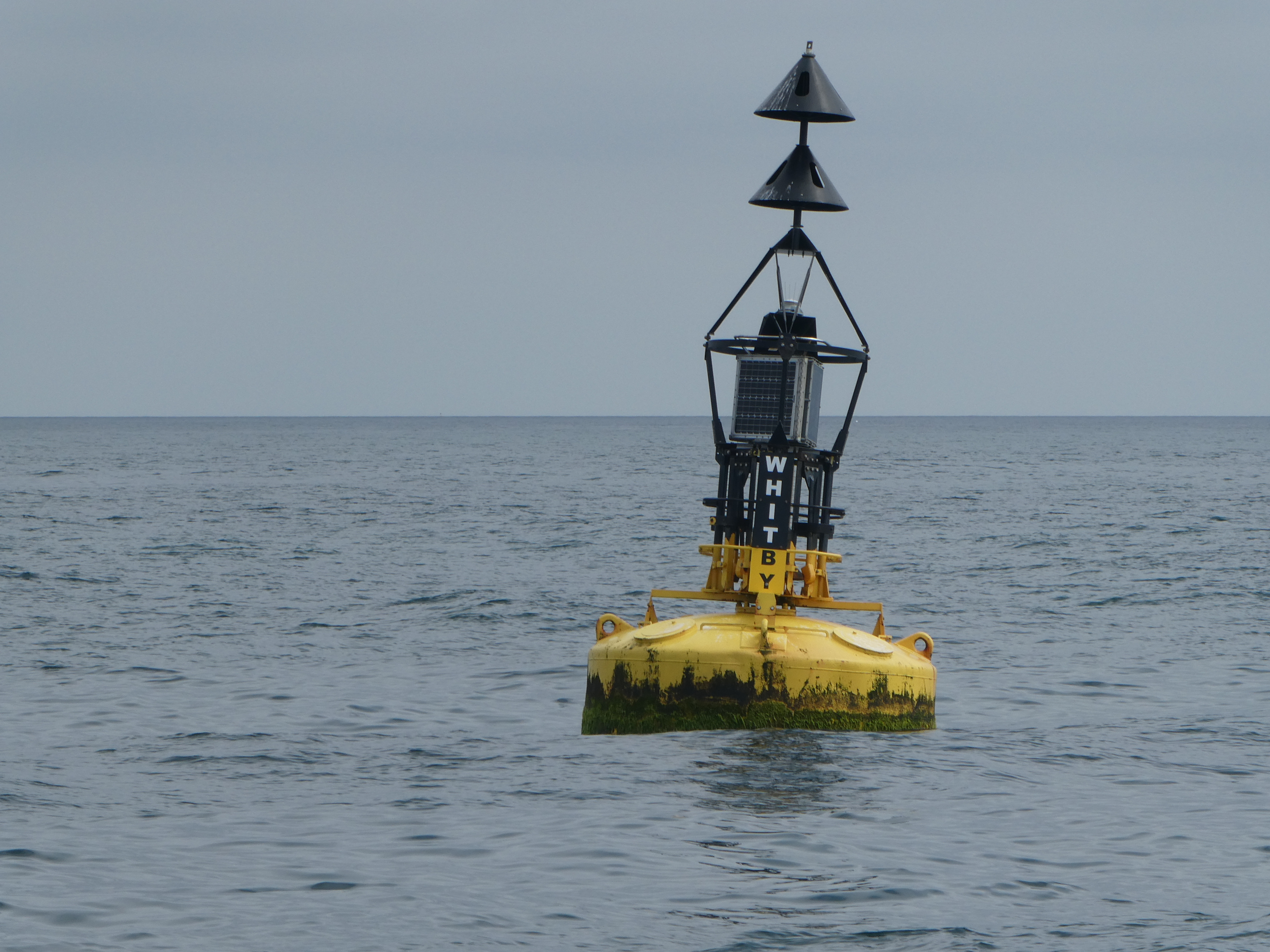
North cardinal buoy off the coast of Whitby, North Yorkshire

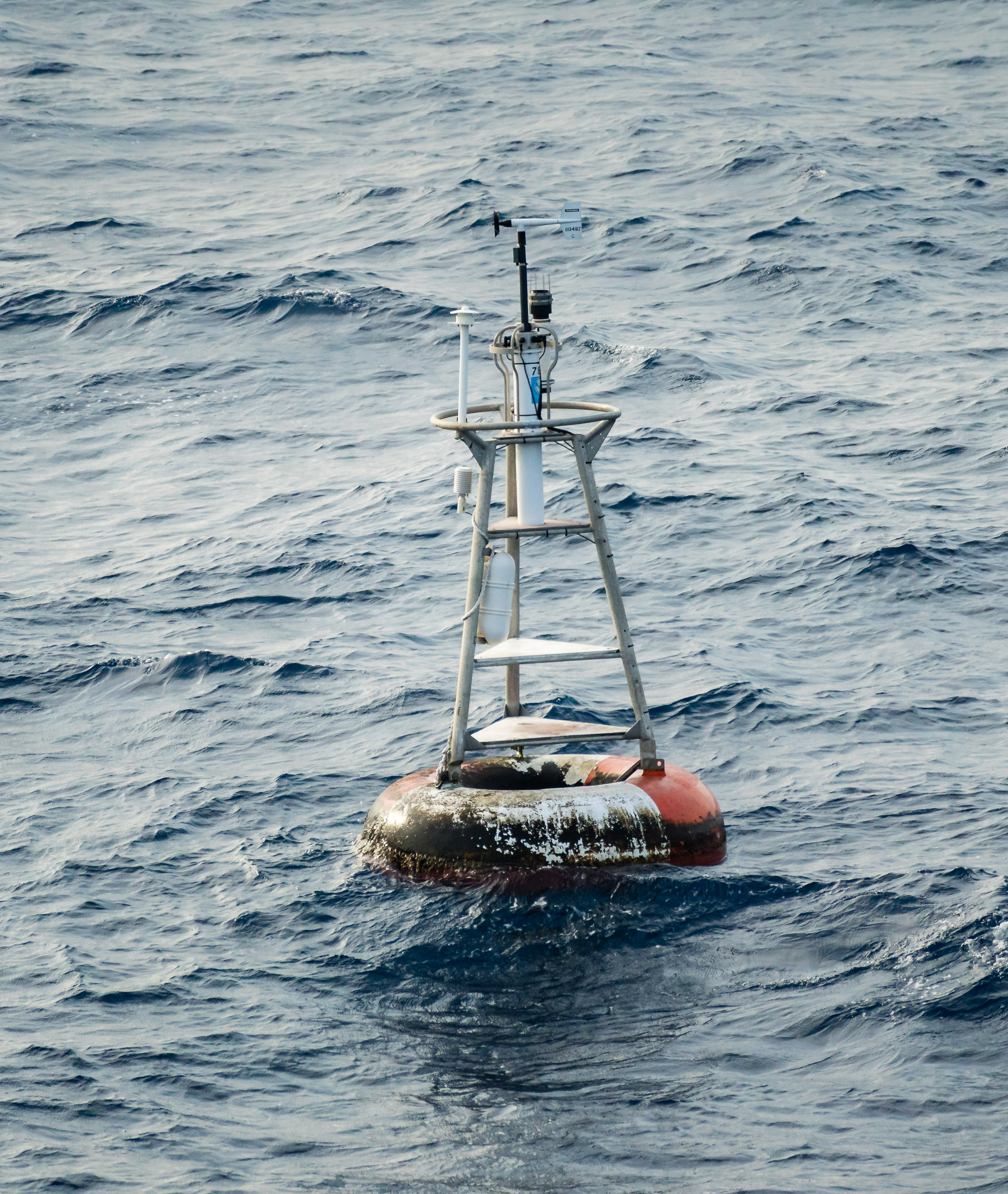
The weather buoy moored at the coordinates of Null Island, located at 0°N 0°E

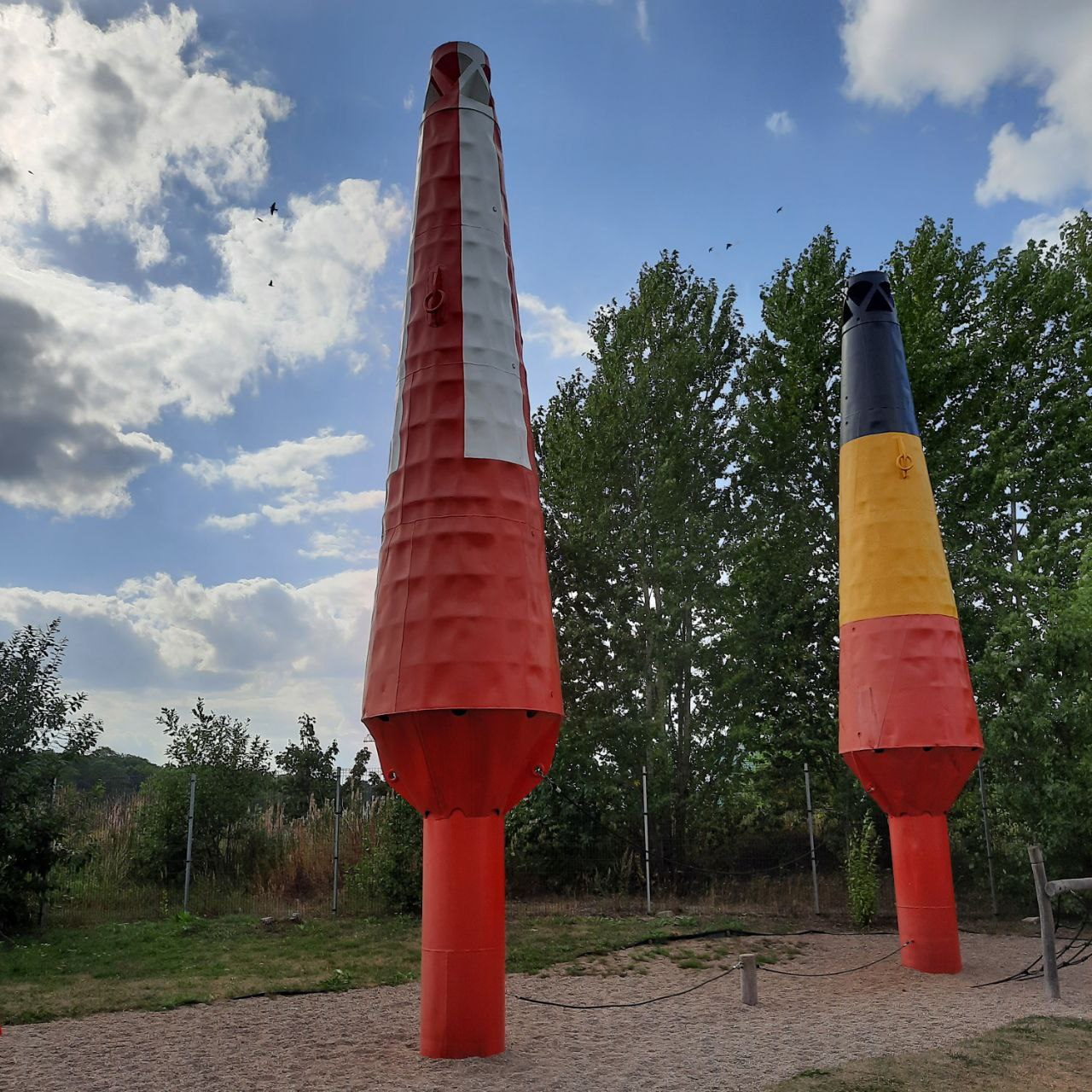
Ice-resistant buoys MR-2S and N-2 at a playground in Tallinn, Estonia

== See also ==
- Bowditch's American Practical Navigator – Encyclopedia of maritime navigation
- Buoy anti-tank obstacle – British anti-tank obstacle
- Buoyancy – Upward force that opposes the weight of an object immersed in fluid
- Day beacon – Unlighted nautical sea mark
- GPS buoy – Buoy equipped with a GPS receiver
- International Arctic Buoy Program – Programme to provide meteorological and oceanographic data
- Lateral mark – Sea mark marking the edge of a channel
- Lighthouse – Structure designed to emit light to aid navigation
- Lightship, also known as Lightvessel – Ship that functions as a lighthouse
- List of lights – Publication describing lighthouses and other aids to maritime navigation
- PowerBuoy – Marine power station
- United States Coast Pilot
