= GPS buoy =

Buoy equipped with a GPS receiver

A GPS buoy is a buoy equipped with a GPS receiver. It is used for sea level and research search-and-rescue operations, among other applications.

== See also ==
- GPS sonobuoy
- Self-locating datum marker buoy
