= Buoy anti-tank obstacle =

British anti-tank obstacle

Buoy is a British type of anti-tank obstacle used to block roads intended to impede enemy movement. Buoys were widely deployed during the invasion crisis of 1940–1941. Each buoy was a truncated cone with a rounded bottom which was constructed out of concrete. They would be placed in at least five rows across a roadway.

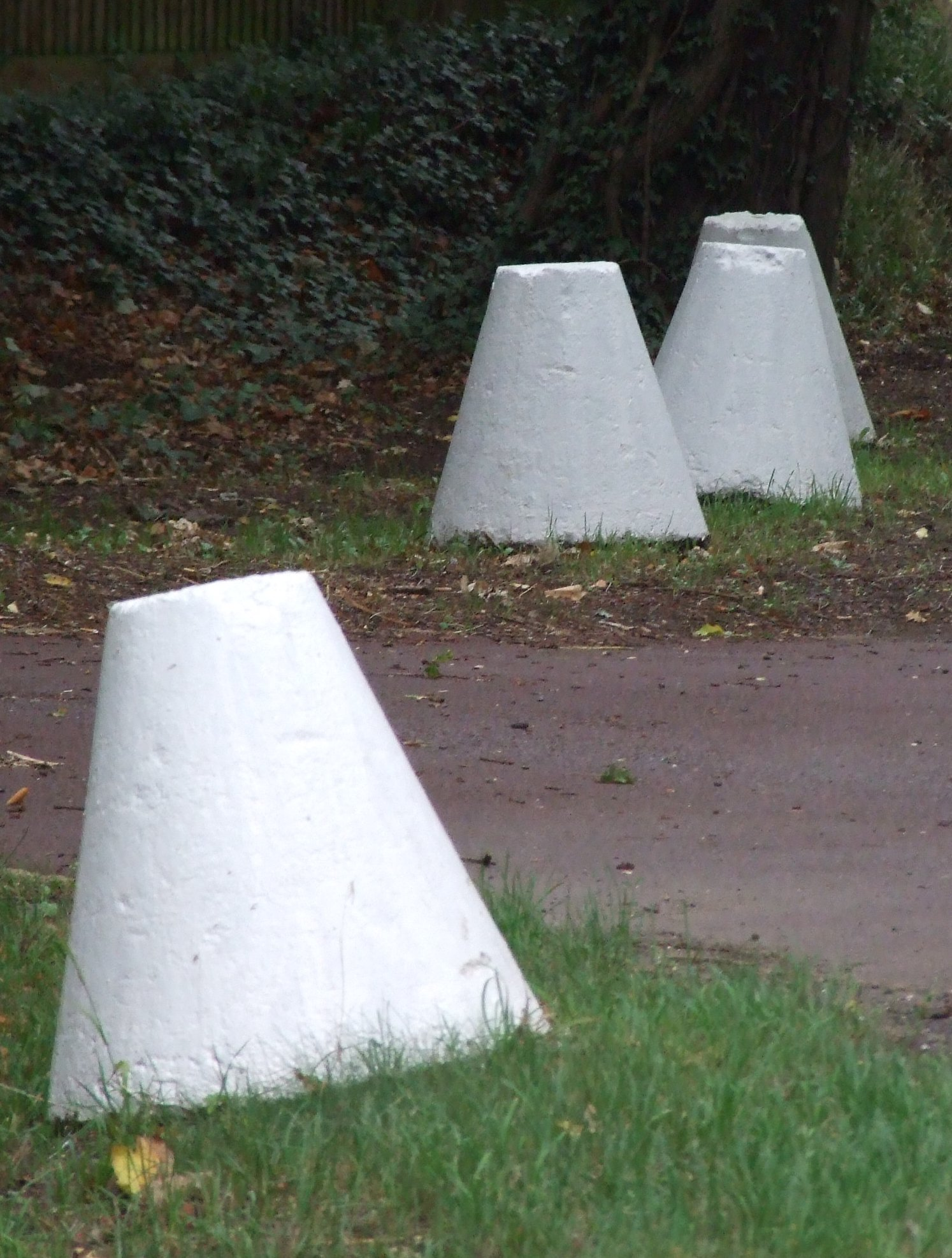
Surviving examples in Sussex

Height	Bottom Diameter	Top Diameter	Hole Diameter
2 feet 9 inches (84 cm)	2 feet 8 inches (81 cm)	9 inches (23 cm)	2 inches (50 mm)

== Usage ==
Buoys were intended as an alternative to a simple cylinder of concrete. The advantage of buoy was that it could be used to block or unblock a road quickly. Passing a rod or crossbar through a pair of buoys formed a wheeled axle that could easily be rolled into place; when the axle was removed the buoys could be separated and stood up. Although easily knocked over, the conical shapes could not be rolled very far, they would move unpredictably and out of the field of view of a tank driver, making it difficult to avoid them. They were eventually judged to be ineffective and phased out.

Extant examples are often found by the roadside today.

== Gallery ==
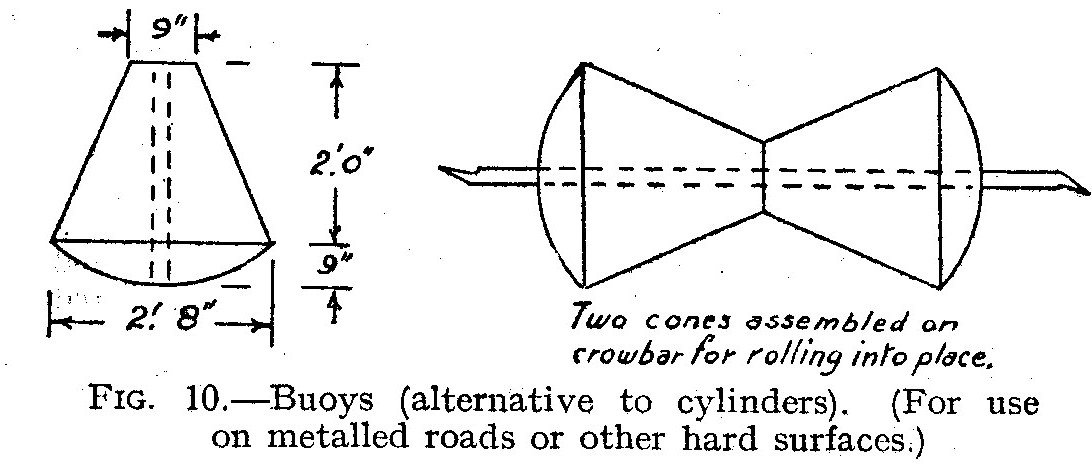
Passing a rod or crossbar through a pair of buoys formed a wheeled axle.

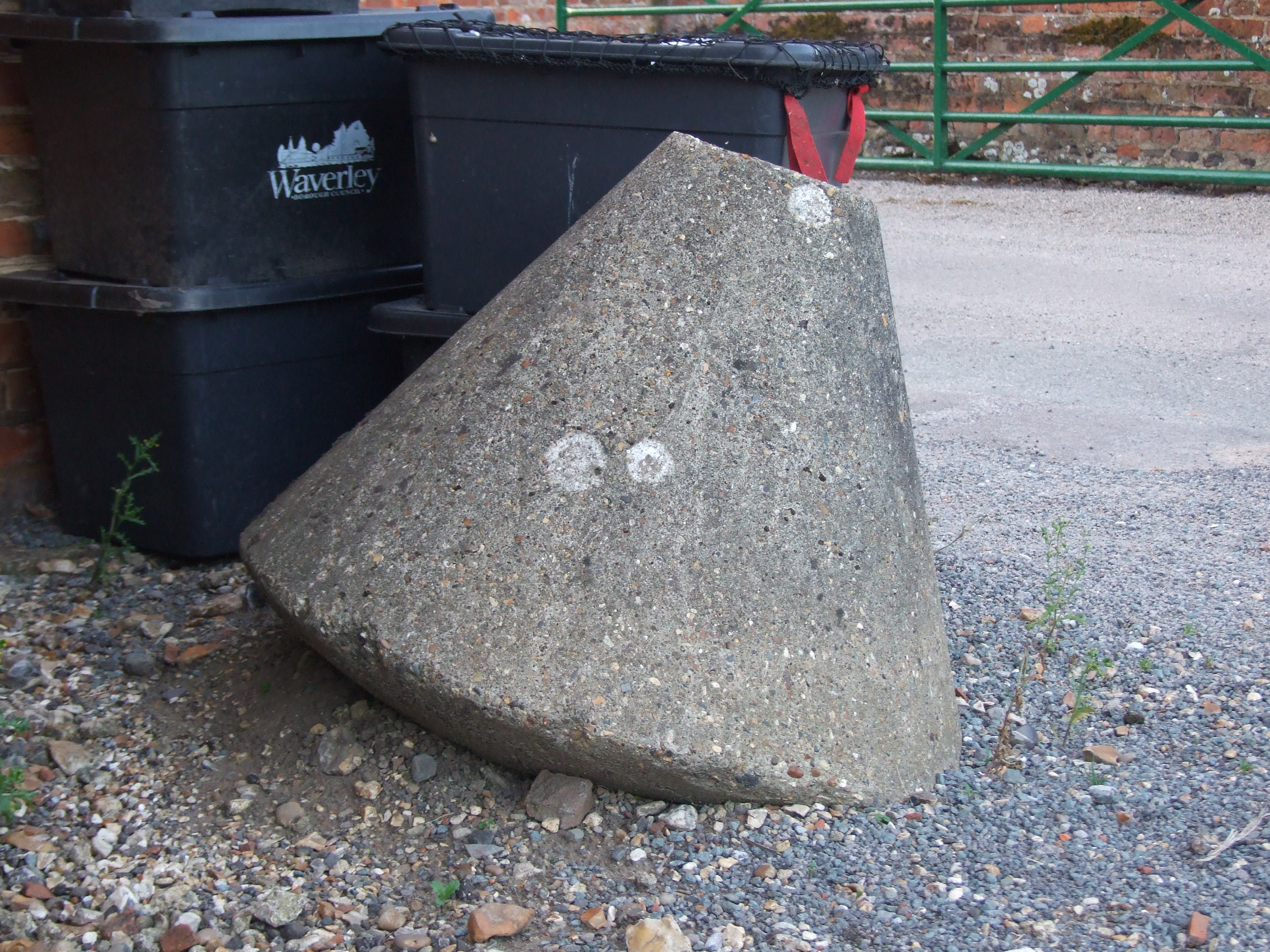
A surviving example in Farnham, Surrey

== See also ==
- British anti-invasion preparations of World War II
- British hardened field defences of World War II
