= Wave buoy =

Device measuring water surface waves

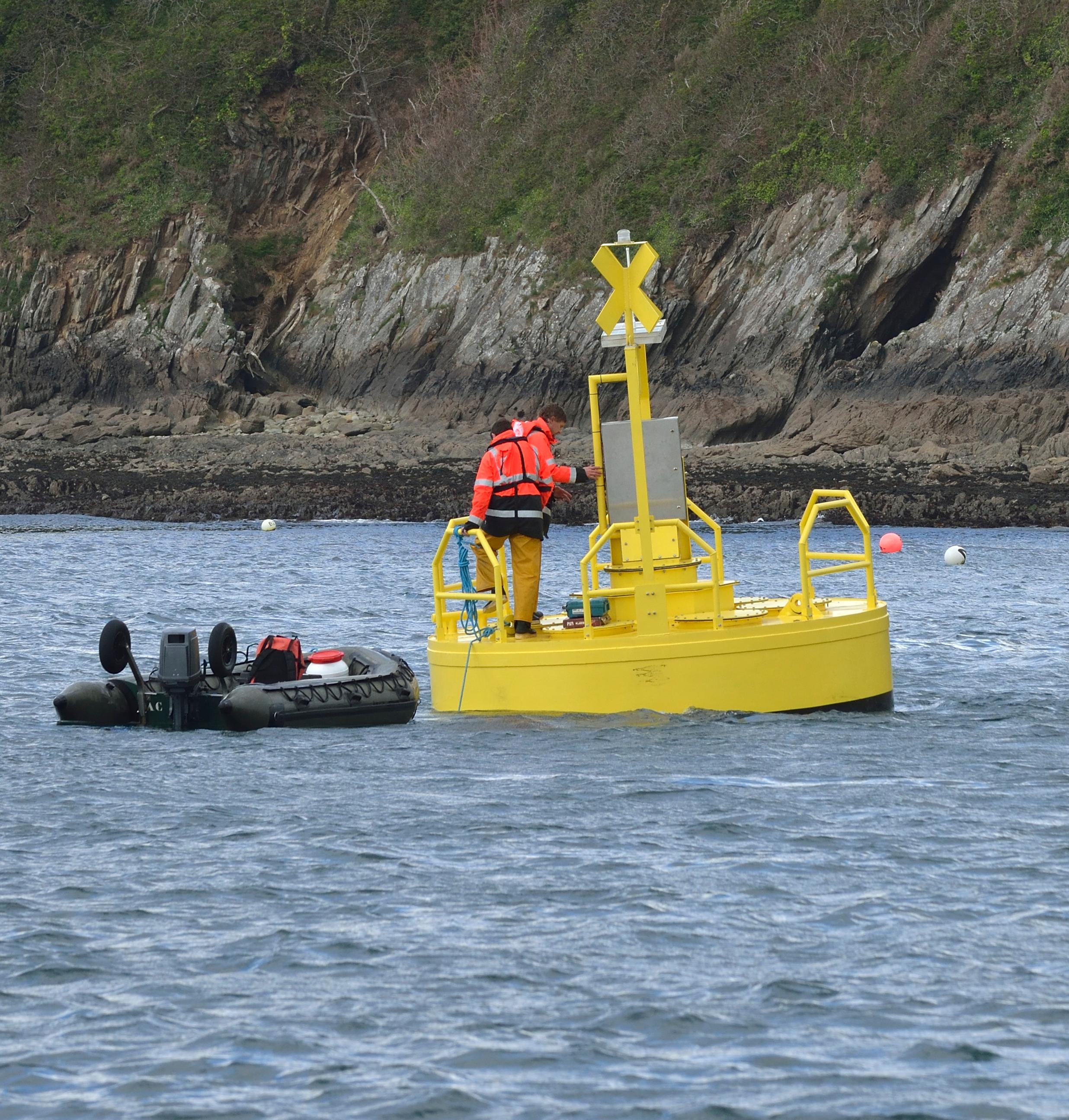
Wave buoy in Brest Harbour

A wave buoy measures how the water surface moves. They are use for statistics about waves.

Wave buoys are used for wave height and direction.

They are accurate at measuring wave frequencies.

Measuring waves is important for transport and safety, which is done by a wave buoy.
