= Töre =

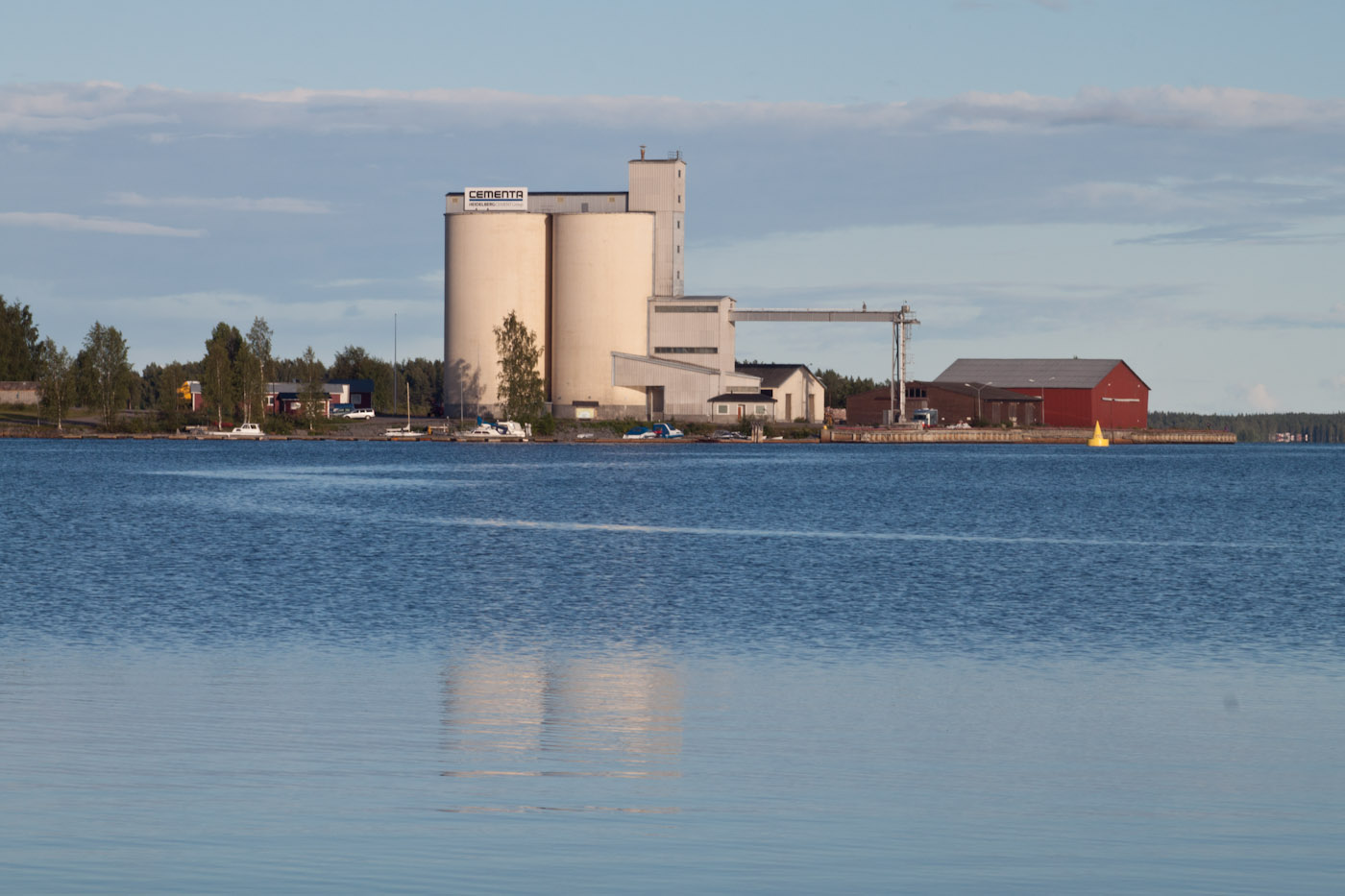

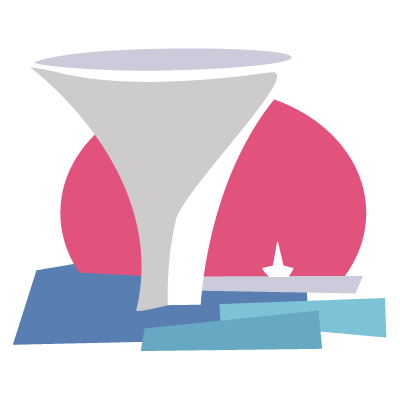
- logo

- Location within Norrbotten Location within Sweden
- Coordinates: 65°55′N 22°39′E
- Country: Sweden
- Province: Norrbotten
- County: Norrbotten County
- Municipality: Kalix Municipality

Area
  - Total: 2.61 km^{2} (1.01 sq mi)

Population (31 December 2010)
  - Total: 1,099
  - Density: 422/km^{2} (1,090/sq mi)
- Time zone: UTC+1 (CET)
  - Summer (DST): UTC+2 (CEST)
- Website: http://tore.nu/

Töre (Kalix Language: te'or) is a locality situated in Kalix Municipality, Norrbotten County, Sweden with 1,099 inhabitants as of 2010.

Its harbour is the northernmost of the Bothnian Bay (and thus, of the Baltic Sea) that is accessible to commercial vessels. The European route E10 passes through Töre.

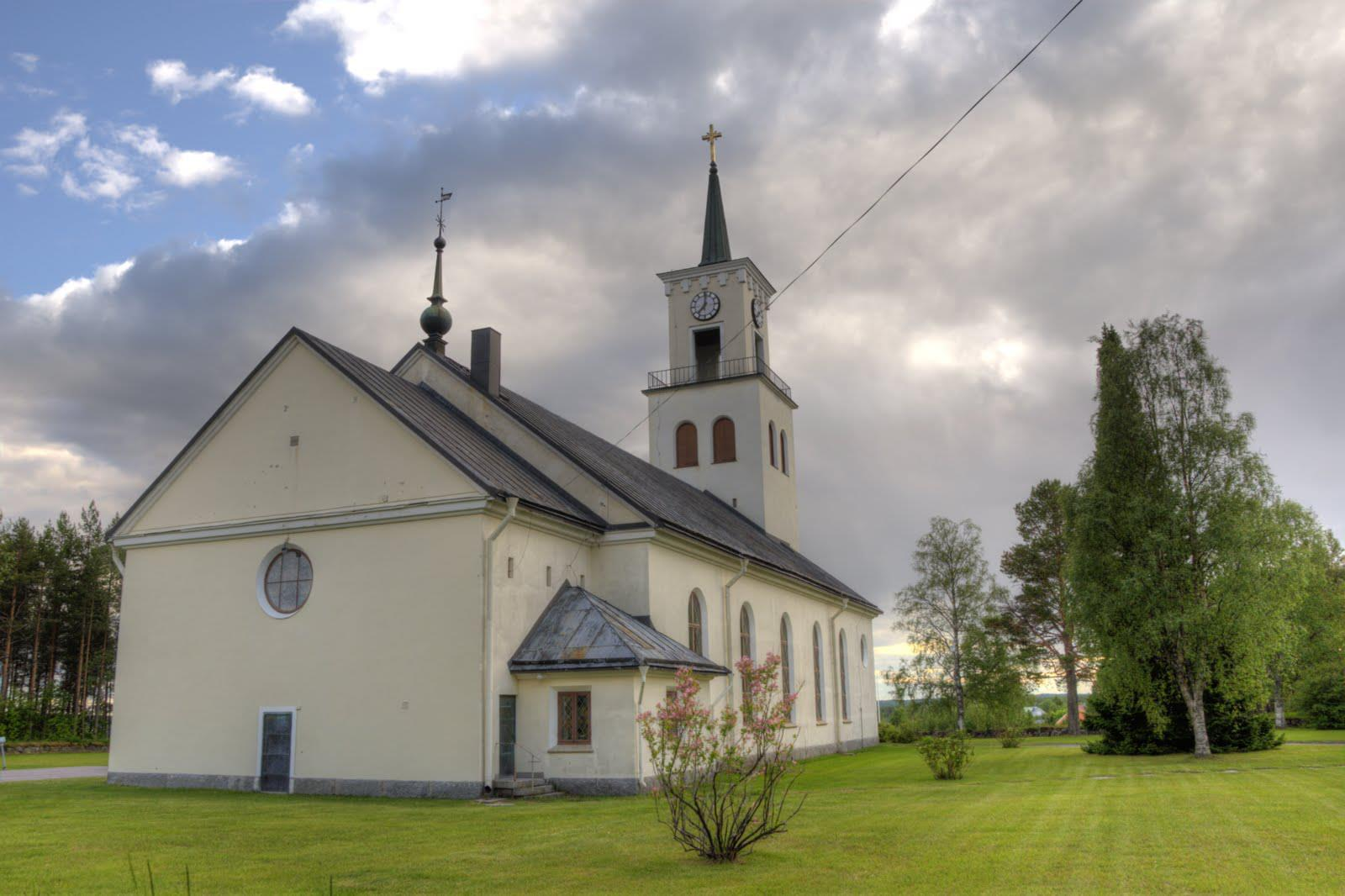
Töre Church
