= Self-locating datum marker buoy =

Drifting surface marker buoy which signals its position

A self-locating datum marker buoy (SLDMB) is a drifting surface buoy designed to measure surface ocean currents. The design is based on those of the Coastal Ocean Dynamics Experiment (CODE) and Davis-style oceanographic surface drifters – National Science Foundation (NSF) funded experiments exploring ocean surface currents. The SLDMB was designed for deployment by United States Coast Guard (USCG) vessels in search and rescue (SAR) missions and is equipped with a Global Positioning System (GPS) sensor that, upon deployment in fresh- or saltwater, transmits its location periodically to the USCG to aid in SAR missions. Additionally, SLDMB is deployed in oceanographic research in order to study surface currents of the ocean. This design has also been utilized by Nomis Connectivity for secure ocean-based communications.

== Design ==
The SLDMB is based on the Davis-style drifter design, which attempts to minimize the effects of wind and surface waves. This is accomplished by reducing the area above the ocean surface to small floats and an antenna. Below the surface is a series of drogue vanes to 70 cm. (less than the 1 m Davis-style buoy) in depth, which catch the ocean current, along with electronic equipment that deploys the vanes and antenna, receives the GPS signal and transmits the location to the USCG.

SLDMB construction varies by manufacturer, but those used by the USCG consist of four orthogonal drag vanes 0.5m wide and 0.7m high of nylon fabric. These are supported by PVC arms at the top and bottom, which extend from a cylindrical hull that contains the electronic equipment. Small floats are attached to the end of each upper arm in order to maintain buoyancy and a small antenna projects above the SLDMB.

Deployment of the SLDMB may be accomplished by aircraft (both fixed-wing and rotary) or by ship. SLDMB deployed by aircraft are encased in a tube and attached to a parachute which decreases the impact produced upon hitting the water but without so much drag that the buoy can drift off-course according to USCG SAR guidelines. Upon reaching the ocean surface, the outer casing and parachute break away from the SLDMB, and the spring-loaded antenna deploys. Electronics consist of a GPS receiver, electronic transmitter, and sufficient batteries to provide continuous data collection for a period of two weeks to one month.

== Specifications ==
The METOCEAN iSLDMB which received the Canadian Coast Guard award in 2012 has the following dimensions and equipment:

Table 1. SLDMB dimensions
SLDMB dimensions
Buoy prior to deployment
Packaged length	1092 mm (43.0 inches)
Diameter	203.2 mm (8.0 inches)
Weight	11.3 kg ( 25.0 pounds)
Deployed surface unit
Hull diameter	102 mm (4.0 inches)
Total height	1400 mm (55.0 inches)
Total cross section width	1090 mm 43 inches)
Drogue vane	500 mm (19.6 inches) X 650 mm (25.6 inches)
Length of exposed mast	400 mm (16.0 inches)
Float size (each is • of the cylinder)	133 mm (5.25 in) diameter X 216 mm ( 8.5 in) long
Weight in air	8.0 kg (17.5 pounds)

Table 2. SLDMB construction
Buoy construction
Hull	Heavy gauge marine grade aluminum
Flotation	Four quarter cylinder foam floats
Antenna	Top-loaded truncated monopole ARGOS antenna with active GPS element antenna above
Drogue Panels	Flexible, nylon cloth

Table 3. SLDMB electronic characteristics
Electronics
ARGOS PTT	METOCEAN model MAT 906
GPS receiver	NAVMAN Jupiter 21 model TU21-D450-031

Table 4. SLDMB sensor characteristics
Sensors
Sea surface temperature	Sensor Scientific thermistor model WM 103
Battery voltage	Precision resistive divider on CC board

== Search-and-rescue application ==
Because it has a small above-water surface and high underwater surface area, the effect of surface winds and waves has a negligible effect, instead moving with the flow of the upper 1m of the water column. The USCG has found that this instrument behaves as a 'zero-leeway' object, moving with the top meter of the water column, with no additional motion due to the direct effect of the wind on the SLDMB's exposed areas. The USCG maintains several hundred SLDMBs for deployment and responds to more than 5,000 SAR cases each year. In the year 2006, more than 400 SLDMBs were deployed in SAR applications, with an average lifetime of 22 days. The USCG may release SLDMBs at their discretion to aid in search efforts. In remote areas, SLDMBs are deployed via C-130 aircraft or helicopters. The GPS unit on each SLDMB calculates its position every 30 minutes and transmits the data via the ARGOS data collection system to the USCG Operational Support Center (OSC). During high-traffic periods, the USCG may pre-deploy units in order to have existing data in areas where SAR operations are more likely, reducing the time required to collect ocean current data during the SAR process. SLDMB may be released as single units or as a group, depending on the situation required. In cases where the last known position is known and the time lag to SLDMB deployment is minimal, only a single unit may be necessary. However, if a sufficient time lag exists, or the last known position is not available, multiple SLDMBs should be used. An example of this second case would be a downed fishing vessel, in which only the approximate area of the vessel is known.

== See also ==
- GPS buoy
