= Trees in mythology =

Significance of trees in religion and folklore

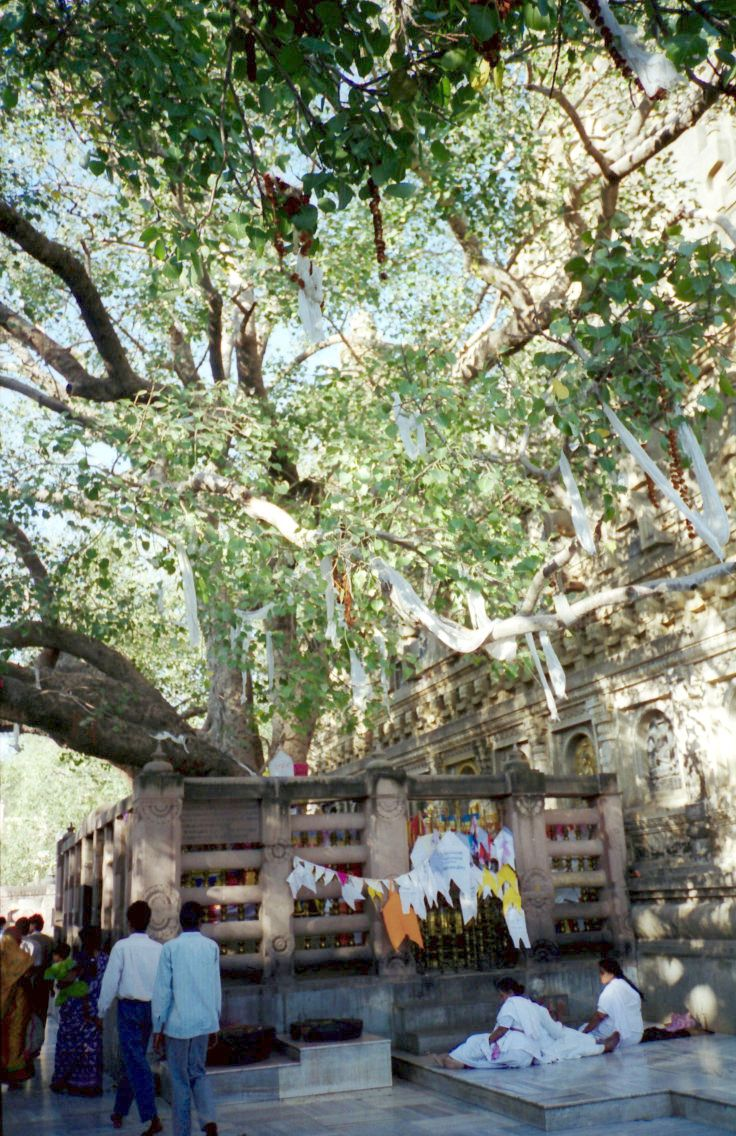
The Bodhi Tree of Bodh Gaya is believed to be the Ficus religiosa under which Gautama Buddha attained enlightenment. It is worshipped by Buddhists. The sacred fig is also venerated in Hinduism and Jainism.

Trees are significant in many of the world's mythologies, and have been given deep and sacred meanings throughout the ages. Human beings, observing the growth and death of trees, and the annual death and revival of their foliage, have often seen them as powerful symbols of growth, death and rebirth. Evergreen trees, which largely stay green throughout these cycles, are sometimes considered symbols of the eternal, immortality or fertility. The image of the tree of life or world tree occurs in many mythologies.

Examples include the banyan and the sacred fig (Ficus religiosa) in Hinduism, Buddhism and Jainism, the tree of the knowledge of good and evil of Judaism and Christianity. In folk religion and folklore, trees are often said to be the homes of tree spirits. Germanic mythology as well as Celtic polytheism both appear to have involved cultic practice in sacred groves, especially grove of oak. The term druid itself possibly derives from the Celtic word for oak. The Egyptian Book of the Dead mentions sycamores as part of the scenery where the soul of the deceased finds blissful repose.

The presence of trees in myth sometimes occurs in connection to the concept of the sacred tree and the sacred grove. Trees are an attribute of the archetypical locus amoenus.

== Wishing trees ==
In many parts of the world travelers have observed the custom of hanging objects upon trees in order to establish some sort of a relationship between themselves and the tree. Throughout Europe, trees are known as sites of pilgrimages, ritual ambulation, and the recital of (Christian) prayers. Wreaths, ribbons or rags are suspended to win favor for sick humans or livestock, or merely for good luck. Popular belief associates the sites with healing, bewitching, or mere wishing.

In South America, Darwin recorded a tree honored by numerous offerings (rags, meat, cigars, etc.); libations were made to it, and horses were sacrificed.

== World tree ==
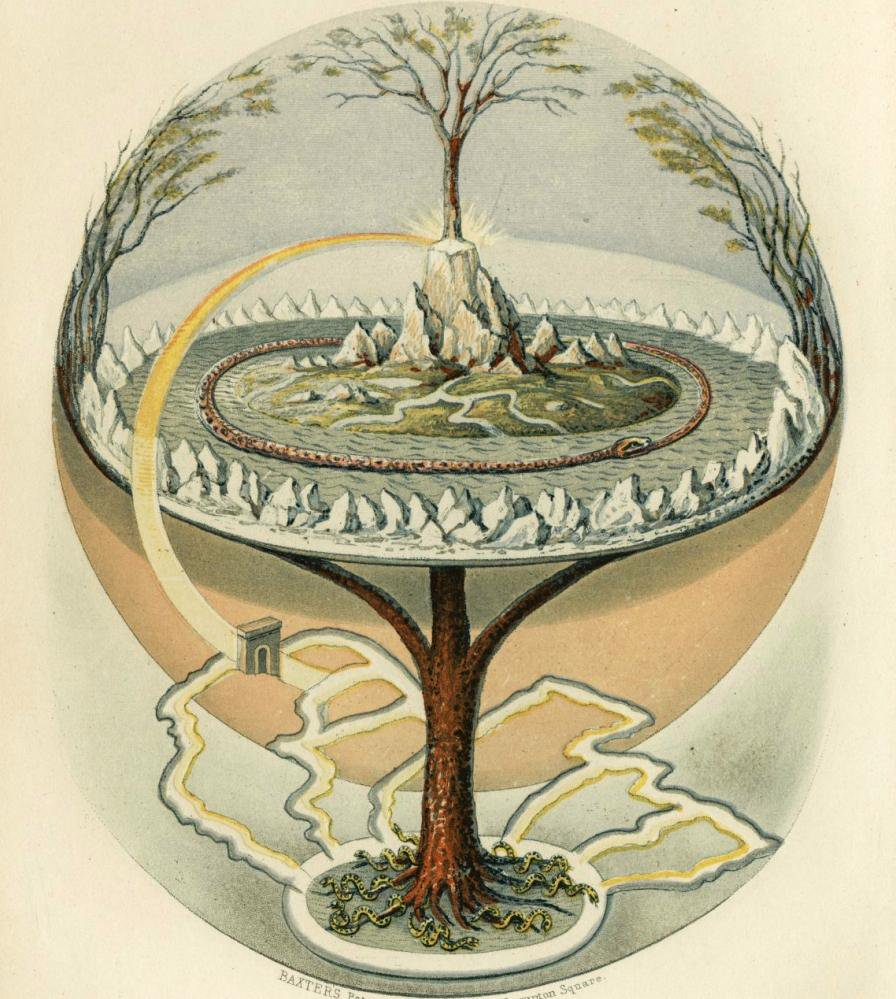
Yggdrasil, the World Ash of Norse mythology

The world tree, with its branches reaching up into the sky, and roots deep into the earth, can be seen to dwell in three worlds—a link between heaven, the earth, and the underworld, uniting above and below. This great tree acts as an axis mundi, supporting or holding up the cosmos. In European mythology, the best-known example is the tree Yggdrasil from Norse mythology.

== Religion and folklore ==
Numerous popular stories throughout the world reflect a firmly-rooted belief in an intimate connection between a human being and a tree, plant or flower. Sometimes a man's life depends upon the tree and suffers when it withers or is injured, and we encounter the idea of the external soul, already found in the Ancient Egyptian Tale of Two Brothers from at least 3000 years ago. Here one of the brothers leaves his heart on the top of the flower of the acacia and falls dead when it is cut down. Sometimes, however, the tree is a mysterious token which shows its sympathy with an absent hero by weakening or dying, as the man becomes ill or loses his life. These two features very easily combine, and they agree in representing to us mysterious sympathy between tree and human life.

Sometimes the new-born child is associated with a newly planted tree with which its life is supposed to be bound up; or, on ceremonial occasions (betrothal, marriage, ascent to the throne), a personal relationship of this kind is instituted by planting trees, upon the fortunes of which the career of the individual depends. Sometimes, boughs or plants are selected and the individual draws omens of life and death. Again, a person will put themselves into relationship with a tree by depositing upon it something which has been in close contact with them, such as hair or clothing.

Often a tree will be associated with oracles. The oak of Dodona was tended by priests who slept on the ground. Forms of the tall oaks of the old Prussians were inhabited by gods who gave responses, and so numerous are the examples that the old Hebrew terebinth of the teacher, and the terebinth of the diviners may reasonably be placed in this category. In Greek myth, oak trees are said to be inhabited by spirits or nymphs called hamadryads, and if they were cut down by mortals, the gods punished them since the beings in the trees were believed to die. Important sacred trees are also the object of pilgrimage, one of the most noteworthy being the branch of the Bo tree at Sri Lanka brought thither before the Christian era. The tree spirits will hold sway over the surrounding forest or district, and the animals in the locality are often sacred and must not be harmed.

The custom of transferring disease or sickness from humans to trees is well known. Sometimes the hair, nails, clothing, etc. of a sickly person are fixed to a tree, or they are forcibly inserted in a hole in the trunk, or the tree is split and the patient passes through the aperture. Where the tree has been thus injured, its recovery and that of the patient are often associated. Different explanations may be found of such customs which naturally take rather different forms among peoples in different grades.

In Arab folklore, sacred trees are haunted by jinn; sacrifices are made, and the sick who sleep beneath them receive prescriptions in their dreams. Here, as frequently elsewhere, it is dangerous to pull a bough. This dread of damaging special trees is familiar: Cato instructed the woodman to sacrifice to the male or female deity before thinning a grove, while in the Homeric poem to Aphrodite the tree nymph is wounded when the tree is injured, and dies when the trunk falls.

Early Buddhism held that trees had neither mind nor feeling and might lawfully be cut; but it recognized that certain spirits might reside in them, such as Nang Takian in Thailand. Propitiation is made before the axe is laid to the holy trees; loss of life or of wealth and the failure of rain are feared should they be wantonly cut; there are even trees which it is dangerous to climb. The Talein of Burma prays to the tree before he cuts it down, and the African woodman will place a fresh sprig upon the tree. In Hawaiian tradition, a tree either located at the end of a valley or on a cliff near the sea, is used by the soul as a gateway to the Underworld (AKA Pit of Milu). Some Ancient Indian tree deities, such as Puliyidaivalaiyamman, the Tamil deity of the tamarind tree, or Kadambariyamman, associated with the kadamba tree were seen as manifestations of a goddess who offers her blessings by giving fruits in abundance.

== In literature ==
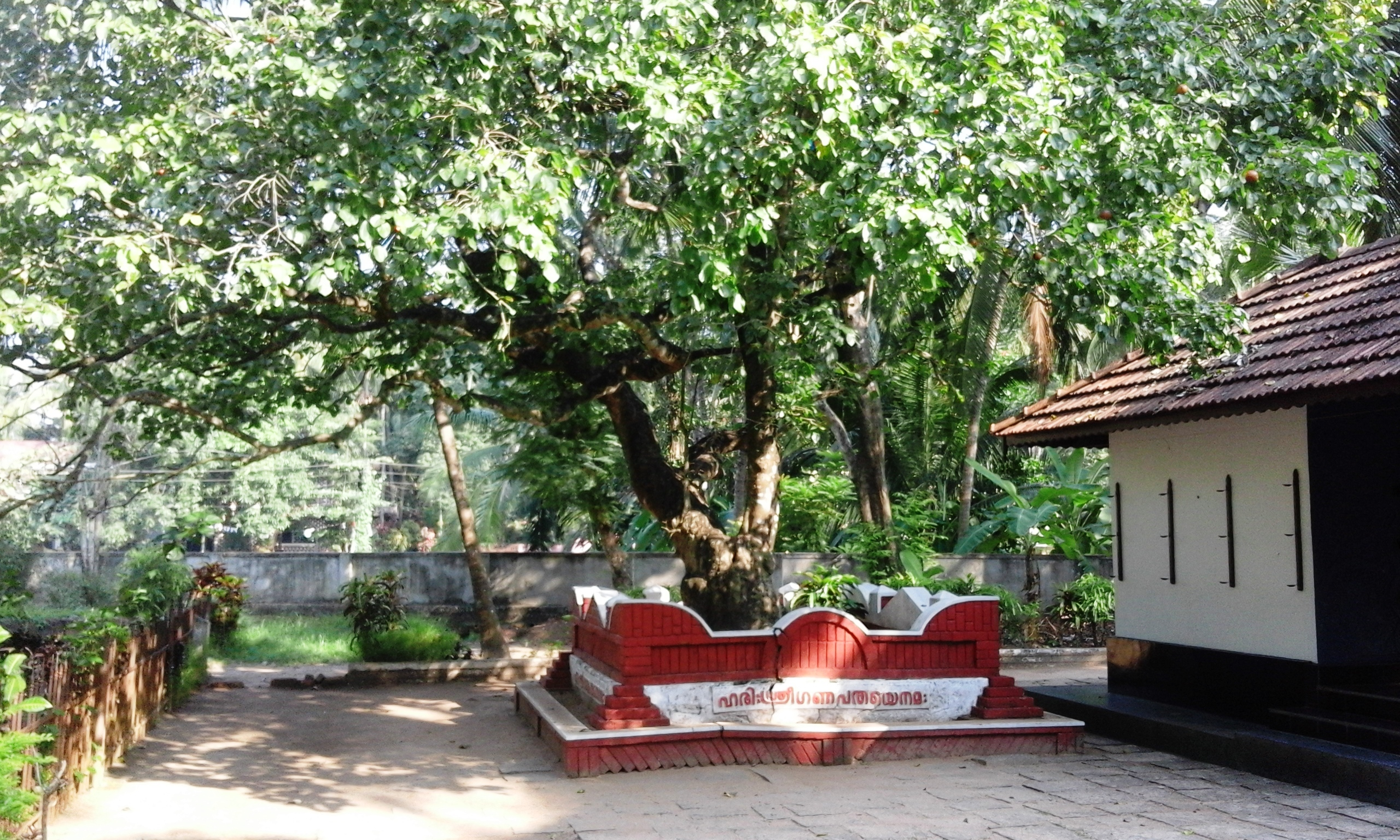
A temple in India with the sacred banyan Tree

- In literature, a mythology was developed by J. R. R. Tolkien, his Two Trees of Valinor playing a central role in his mythopoeic cosmogony. Tolkien's 1964 Tree and Leaf combines the allegorical tale Leaf by Niggle and his essay On Fairy-Stories. In The Lord of the Rings, the White Tree of Gondor stands as a symbol of Gondor in the Court of the Fountain in Minas Tirith.
- W. B. Yeats describes a "holy tree" in his poem "The Two Trees" (1893).
- In George R. R. Martin's A Song of Ice and Fire series, one of the main religions, that of "the old gods" or "the gods of the North", involves sacred groves of trees ("godswoods") with a white tree with red leaves at the center known as the "heart tree".
- In Leigh Bardugo's Six of Crows, the Fjerdans worship a god called Djel, symbolized as a white ash tree.

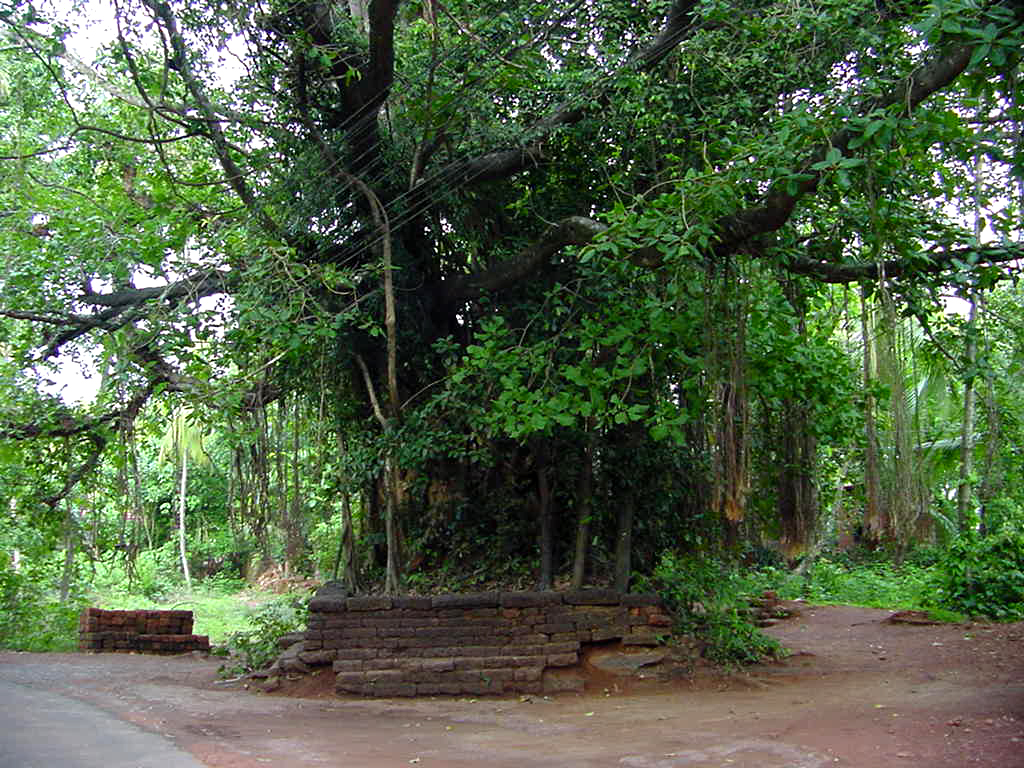
Tree worship at Kannur in India

== In film and TV ==
- In the third (sixth chronologically) Star Wars film, Return of the Jedi, the Ewoks worship trees on the forest moon of Endor.
- In the fictional universe of the film Avatar, the Pandoran biosphere habitates trees, which are of fundamental importance for the Na'vi people, like the Hometrees, the Tree of Souls and the Tree of Voices as well as Woodsprites.
- In the TV series Teen Wolf, an element of the plot is the Nemeton, a sacred tree from which druids draw power through human sacrifices, and which later acts as a beacon, drawing supernatural entities to the nearby town of Beacon Hills.
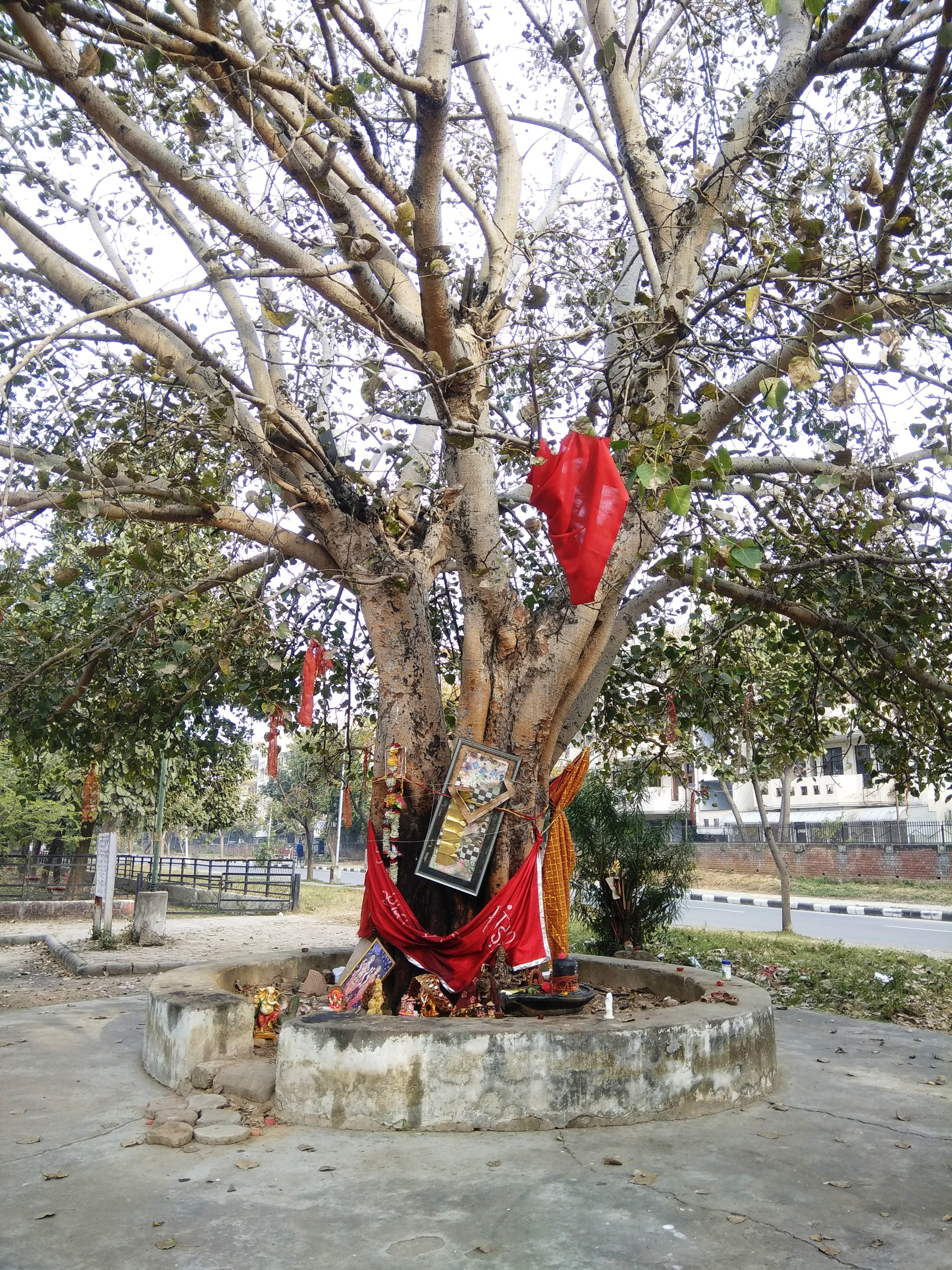
  Tree worship in Chandigarh

== See also ==
- Axis mundi
- Bodhi tree
- Celtic sacred trees
- Ceremonial pole
- Christmas tree
- Enchanted forest
- Five Trees
- Gerichtslinde
- Karam (festival)
- List of tree deities
- Mesoamerican world tree
- Nature worship
- New Year tree
- Plant soul
- Sacred trees and groves in Germanic paganism and mythology
- Sacred garden
- Sacred grove
- Sacred herbs
- Sefirot
- Sidrat al-Muntaha
- Talking tree
- Trail trees
- Tree of Knowledge of Good and Evil
- Tree of life
- Tree of life (biblical)
- Tree of life (Kabbalah)
- Wish tree
- World tree
- Zapis
- Trees in the Book of Mormon
