= Navigational aid =

Equipment to aids the traveler in navigation

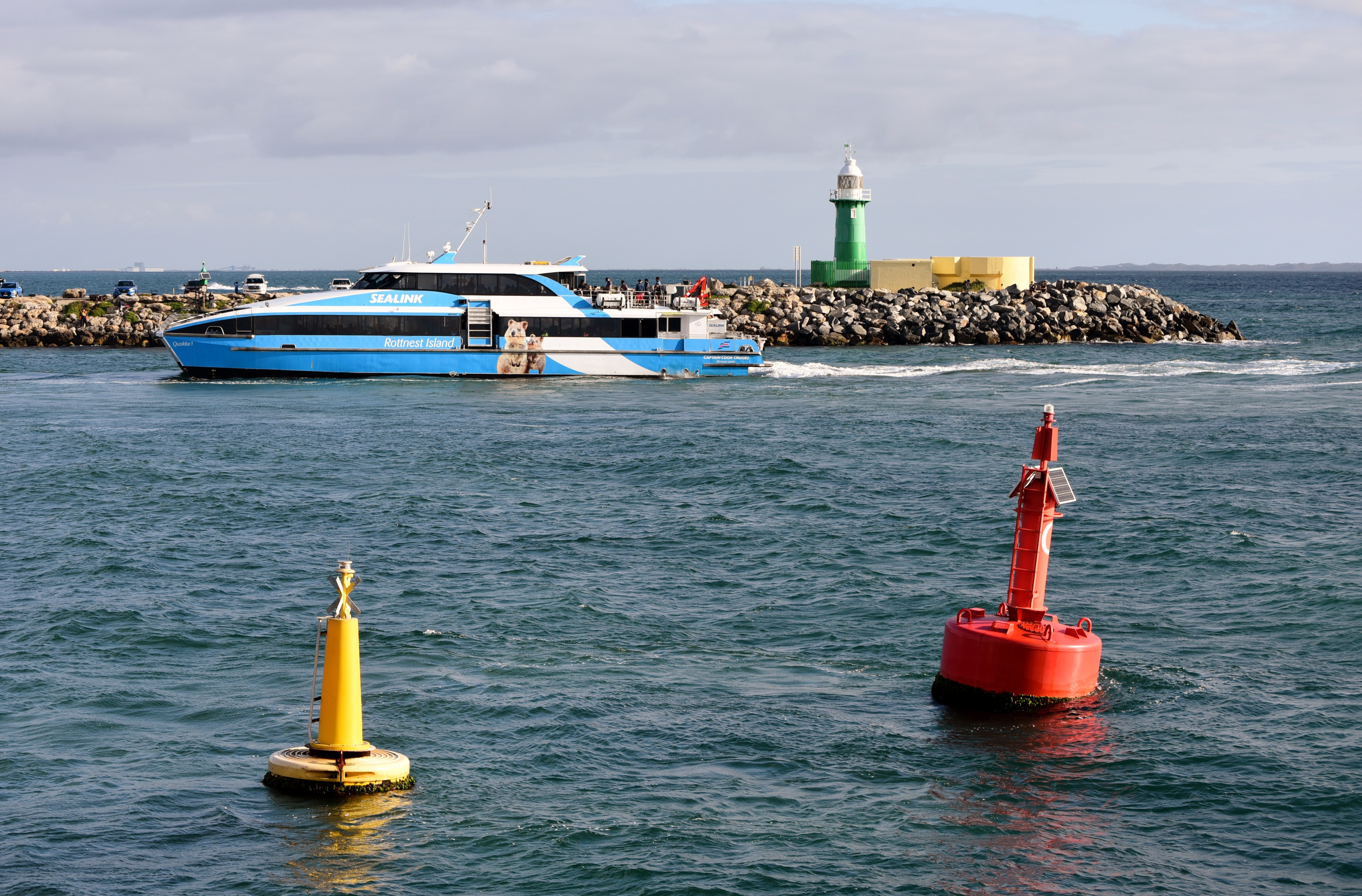
The entrance to the inner harbour of the Port of Fremantle, Australia, with a yellow special mark at left, a region A red port lateral mark at right, and a region A green starboard lighthouse in the background

A navigational aid (NAVAID), also known as aid to navigation (ATON), is any sort of signal, markers or guidance equipment which aids the traveller in navigation, usually nautical or aviation travel. Common types of such aids include lighthouses, buoys, fog signals, and day beacons.

== Definition ==
According to the glossary of terms in the United States Coast Guard Light list, an aid to navigation (ATON) is any device external to a vessel or aircraft specifically intended to assist navigators in determining their position or safe course, or to warn them of dangers or obstructions to navigation.

== Lateral marks ==
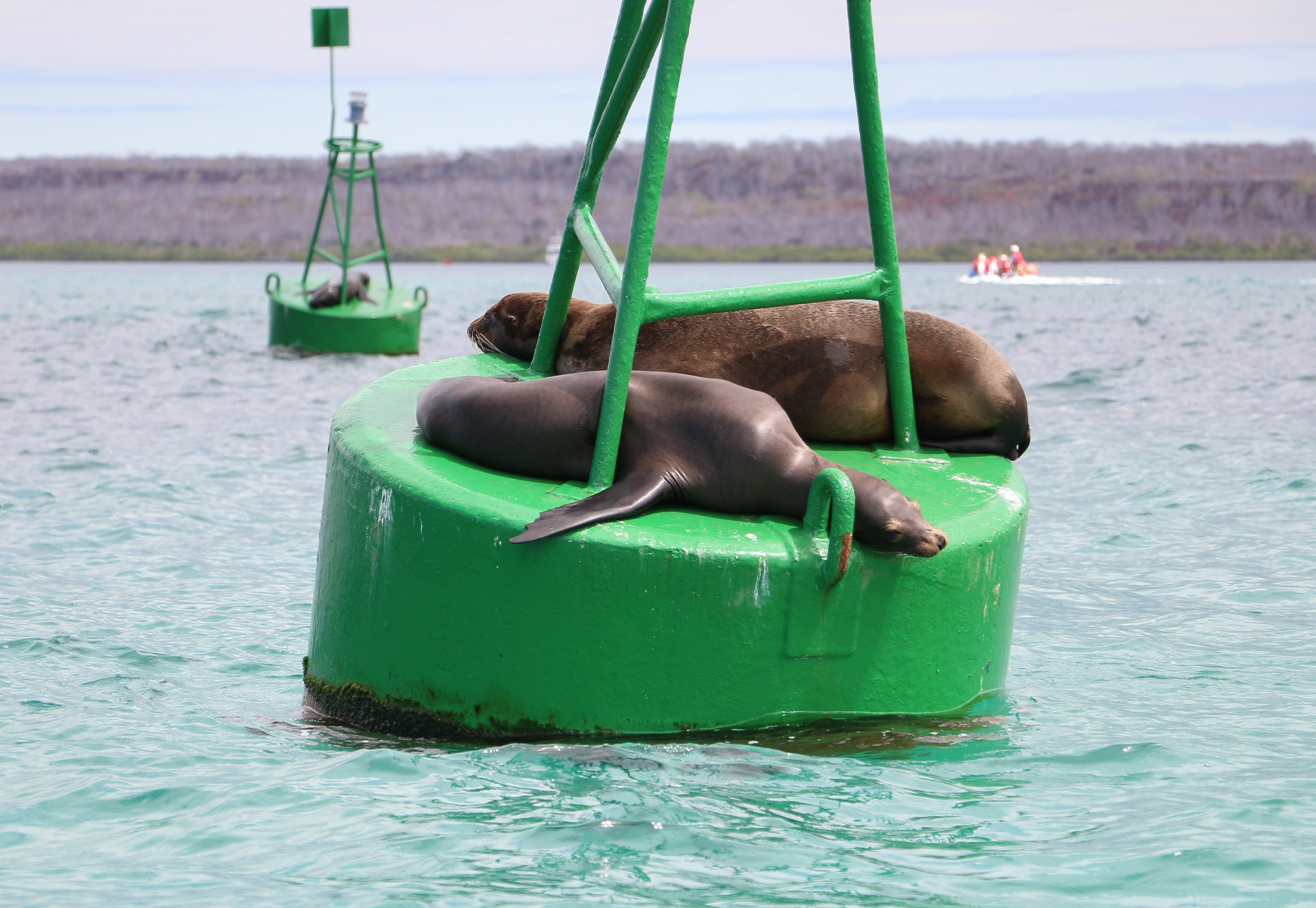
Region B green port lateral marks (with Galápagos sea lions (Zalophus wollebaeki)) in the Galápagos Islands

Lateral marks indicate the edge of the channel. The standards are defined by the International Association of Marine Aids to Navigation and Lighthouse Authorities (IALA). Approaching harbour port a vessel leaves port hand marks to port (left) and starboard hand marks to starboard (right). Port hand marks are cylindrical, starboard marks are conical. If the mark is a pillar or spar shape, then a topmark is fitted which is either cylindrical or conical as appropriate.

IALA divides the world into two regions: A and B. Region B is the Americas (excluding Greenland) along with Japan, Korea and the Philippines. Region A is the rest of the world. In region A port marks are red and starboard marks green. In region B port marks are green and starboard red. Where marks are numbered red marks have even numbers and green marks have odd numbers.

=== Bifurcation marks ===
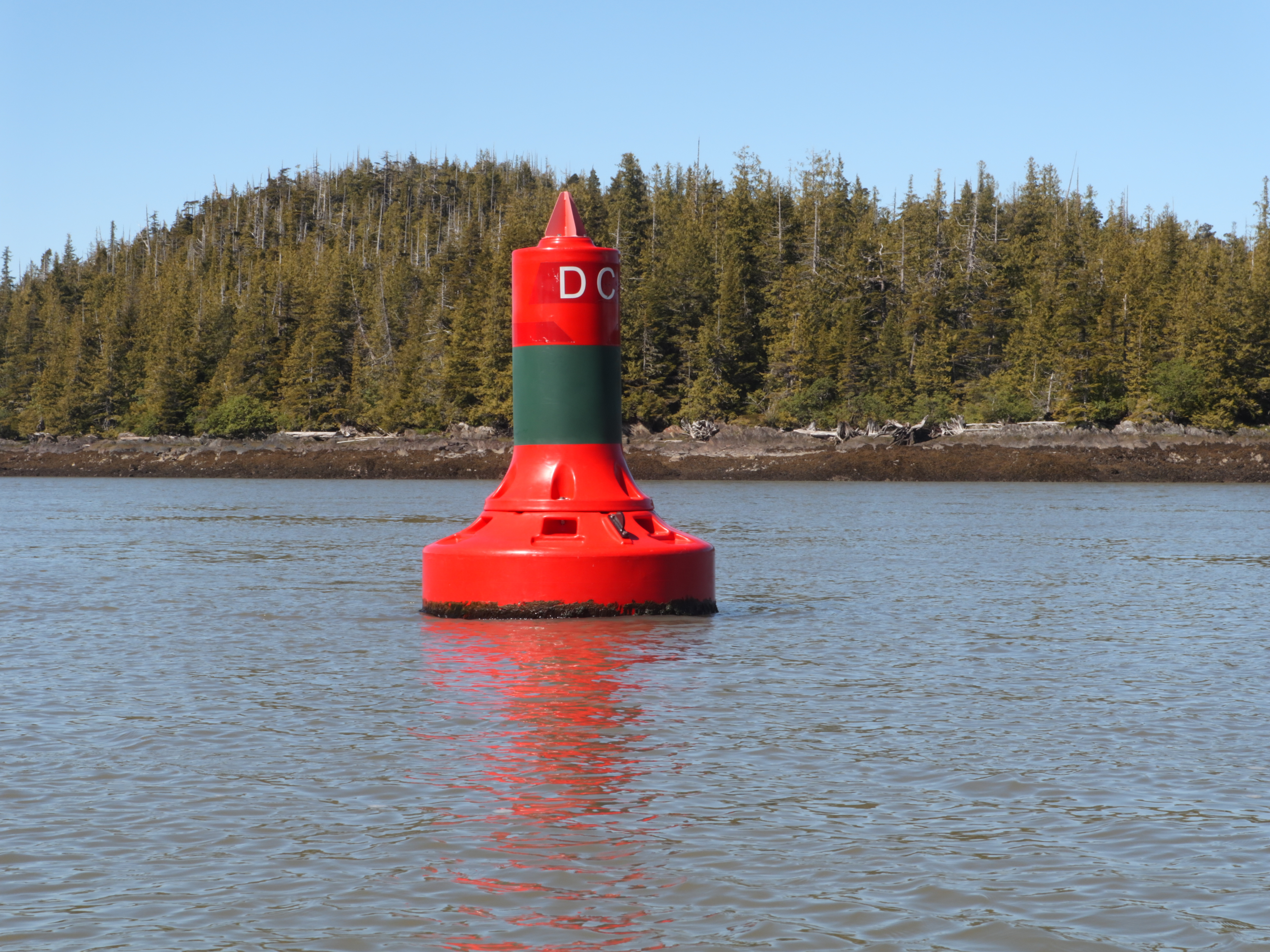
IALA-B starboard hand bifurcation buoy

Where a channel divides the mark at the junction (also called a "preferred channel mark" or "junction buoy"). The mark has the colour and shapes corresponding to the preferred channel with a band of the other colour to indicate it is the other hand mark for the subsidiary channel. In IALA region A where a minor channel branches off to port the mark at the junction would be a red cylinder with a green band. The red cylinder is a port hand mark for the main channel, the green band indicates a starboard mark for the minor channel. In IALA region B the colours (but not shapes) are reversed.

== Cardinal marks ==
Cardinal marks warn of a danger (wrecks, shoals, bends, spits etc.) and indicate the safe water past the danger. There are four varieties: north, east, south and west. A north cardinal mark is placed to the north of a hazard and indicates safe water is to the north of the mark. East, south and west are placed accordingly. Cardinal marks are yellow and black with two cones at top marks. There is no difference between IALA region A and B.

== Other IALA defined marks ==
=== Isolated danger mark ===
Black with a horizontal red band and two black balls as a top mark. The mark indicates a danger (shoal, rock, wreck etc.) which is isolated with safe water all around.

=== Safe water mark ===
Red and white vertical stripes with a single red sphere for a top mark. It indicates that there is safe water all around it. The usual use is to indicate the start of a channel or port approach.

=== New danger ===
Indicates a newly discovered or created danger that is not yet marked on charts (or in update notices thereto). The mark is used for a short time until the danger is either removed or else marked conventionally with lateral or cardinal marks. The mark has blue and yellow vertical stripes and a yellow and blue light. The topmark is a vertical yellow cross.

=== Special marks ===
Yellow with an "X" topmark. Used to mark other features such as swimming areas, anchorages, pipelines. The exact reason is marked on charts.

=== Sector lights ===
A sector light is one which shows different colours depending upon the angle of approach. They are commonly used to indicate the safe channel (white) and show red or green if the vessel is out of the safe channel. IALA requires the light colours to follow the appropriate region (A or B) colour scheme.

== Other markers ==
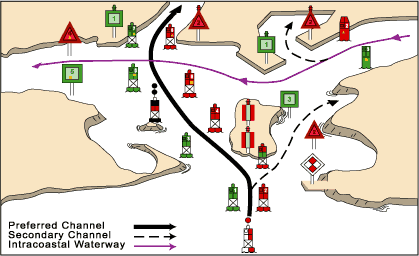
Diagram showing lateral, non-lateral, and special purpose markers as seen on an IALA Region B nautical chart.

There are also other markers that give information other than the edges of safe waters. Most are white with orange markings and black lettering. They are used to give direction and information, warn of hazards and destructions, mark controlled areas, and mark off-limits areas. These ATONs do not mark traffic channels.

On non-lateral markers, there are some shapes that show certain things:

Squares
show information, including places to find food, supplies, and repairs. They sometimes show directions.
Diamonds
warn about dangers like rocks, construction, dams, or stumps.
Circles
mark a controlled area such as no wake, idles speed, speed limit, or ski zone.
Crossed diamonds
show areas off limits to all boats, like swimming areas and dams.

== AIS AtoNs ==
AtoNs can be integrated with automatic identification system (AIS). AIS transmitted form an actual aid (buoy, lighthouse etc.) is termed a "real AIS AtoN".

If it is impractical to equip the AtoN with an AIS transponder an AIS shore station can be assigned to transmit AIS messages on behalf of the AtoN. This is known as a "synthetic ATON". Synthetic AtoNs can be either "monitored synthetic AtoNs" or "predicted synthetic AtoNs". The former have a link between the AtoN so that the AIS station can confirm the AtoNs status. The latter have no link and the AIS system just predicts that the AtoN is where it should be.

If there is no real AtoN (such as for the short term marking of a wreck) then a "virtual AIS AtoN" is used.

Each AIS AtoN must have a unique Maritime Mobile Service Identity (MMSI) number. Synthetic and virtual AIS AtoNs mark their messages as repeats to indicate that the location of the transmitter is not the location of the AtoN.

== Lead marks and lights ==
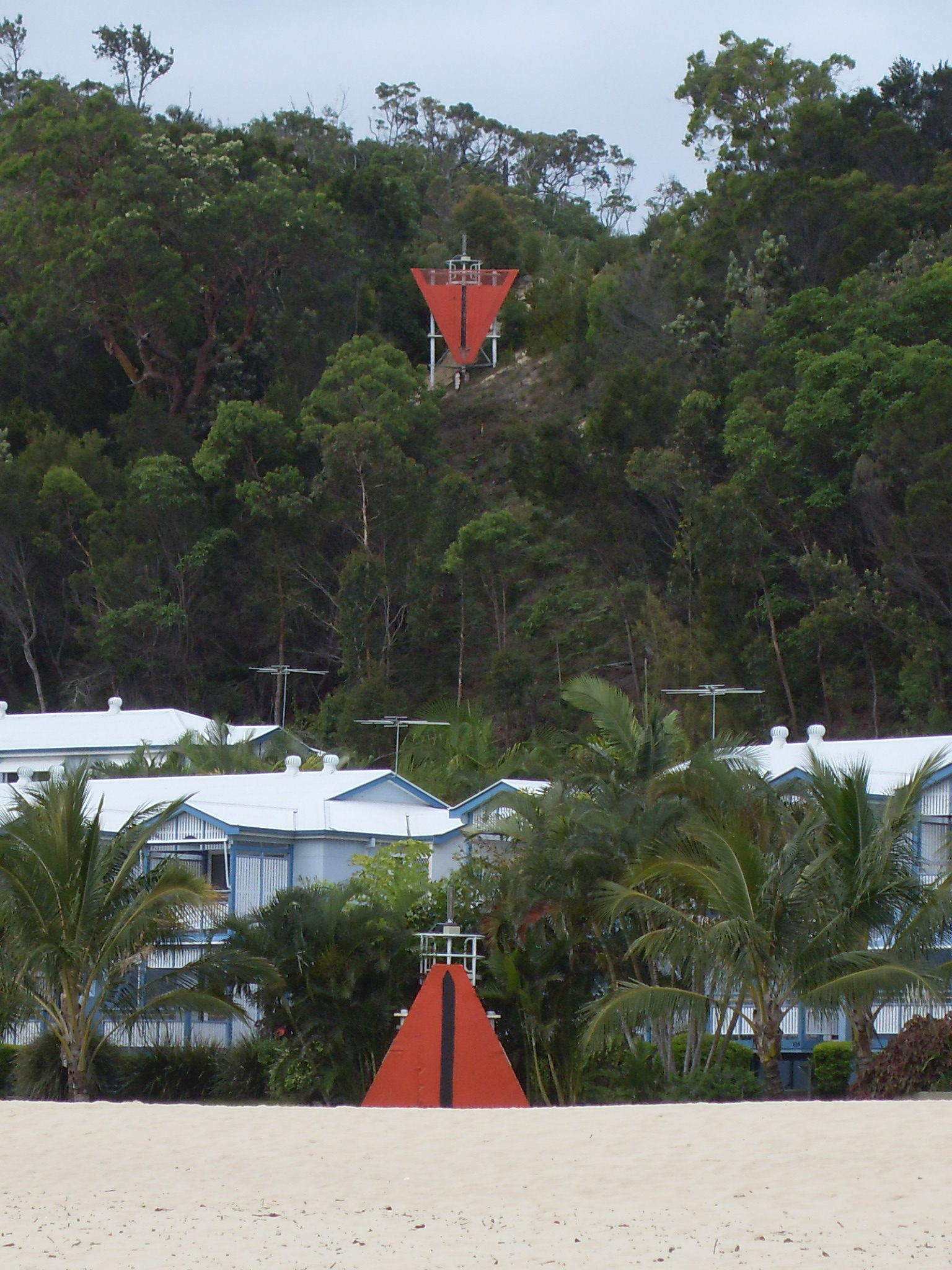
Triangle shaped lead marks with lights.

Lead marks (as in "leading a ship into a safe place") and lights are fixed markers that are laterally displaced to allow a mariner to navigate a fixed channel along the preferred route. They are also known as "channel markers". They can normally be used coming into and out of the channel. When lit, they are also usable at night. Customarily, the upper mark is up-hill from the lower (forward) mark. The mariner will know the geometry of the marks/lights from the navigational chart and can understand that when "open" (not one above the other) the ship needs to be navigated to "close" the marks (so one is above the other) and be in the preferred line of the channel.

In some cases, the lead marks/lights are provided by lasers, as in the laser channel under the Tasman Bridge on the River Derwent at Hobart, Tasmania.

== See also ==
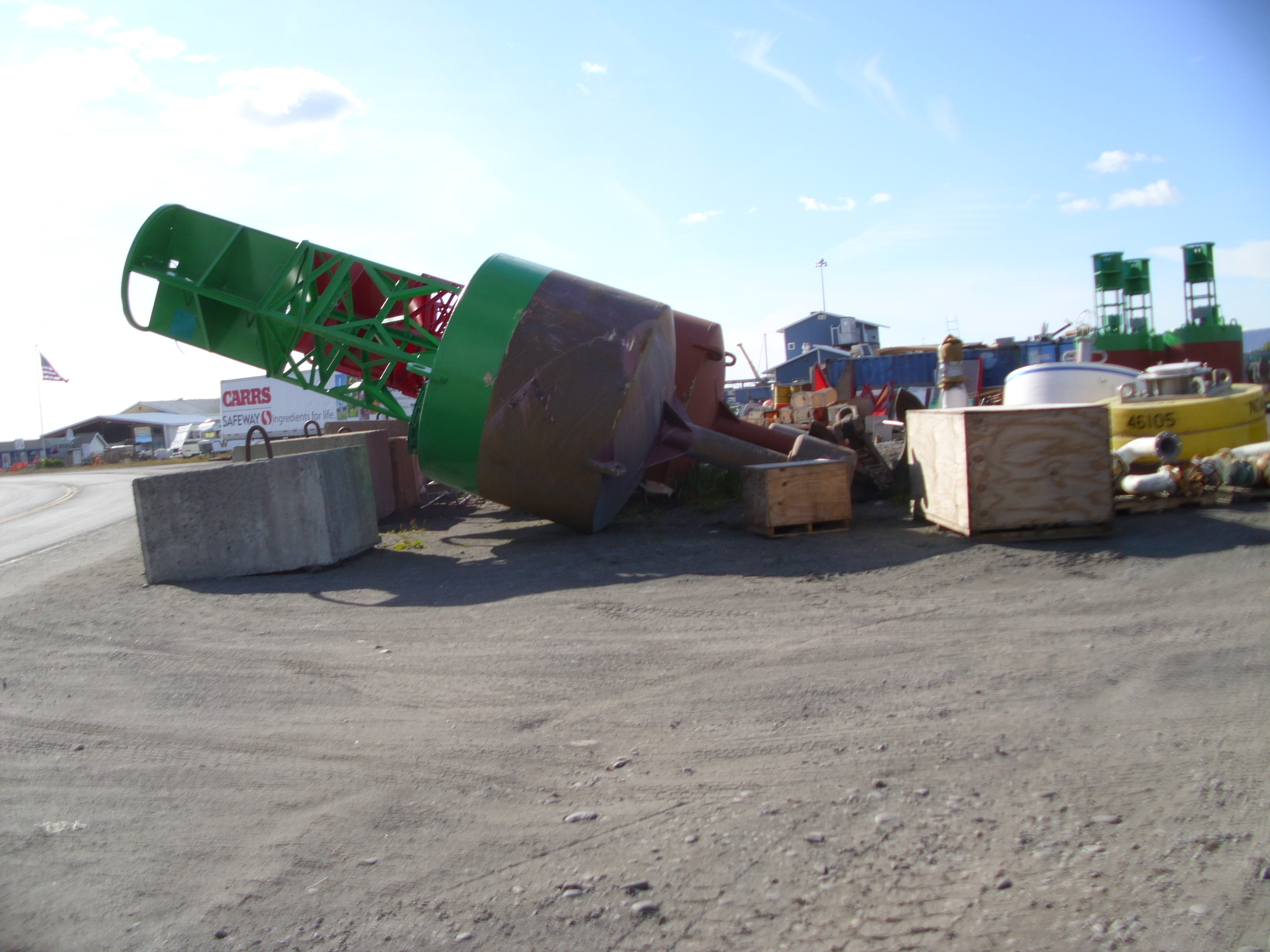
large buoy in storage, Homer, Alaska

- USCG aids to navigation boat
- Buoy
- Daymark
- Distance Measuring Equipment (DME)
- Foghorn
- Global Positioning System (GPS)
- Instrument Landing System (ILS)
- Landmark
- Light characteristic
- Lighthouse
- Lob trees
- LORAN
- Non-Directional Beacon (NDB)
- Racon
- Radio navigation
- Range light
- Sea mark
- Signal station
- Submarine signals
- Tactical Air Navigation (TACAN)
- VHF Omni-directional Range (VOR)
- International Regulations for Preventing Collisions at Sea

== Notes ==
- IALA (13 August 2013). Maritime buoyage system and other aids to navigation (PDF).
