= Trail trees =

Hardwood trees shaped by Native Americans

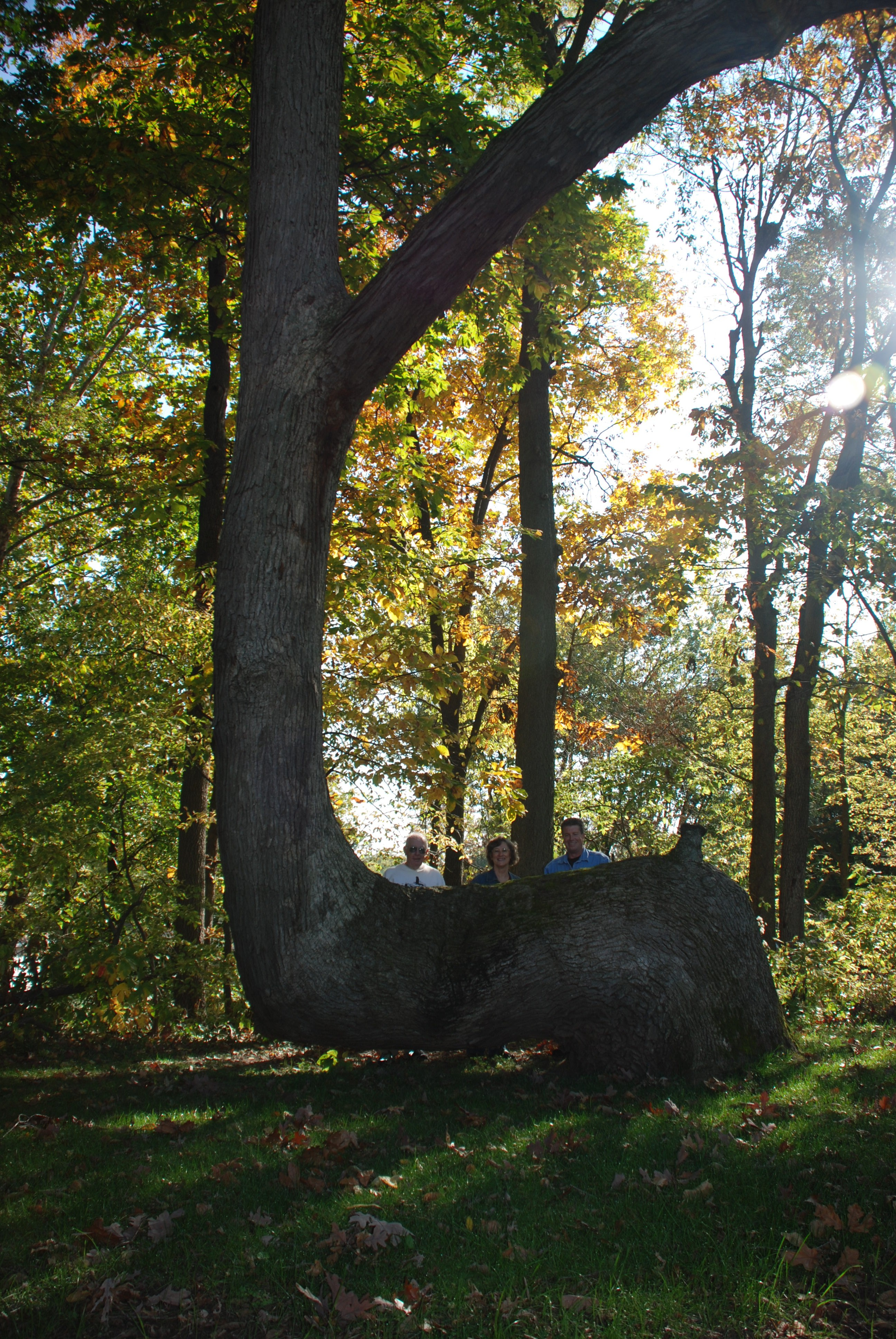
Living trail marker tree in White County, Indiana known as "Grandfather"

Trail trees, trail marker trees, crooked trees, prayer trees, thong trees, or culturally modified trees are hardwood trees throughout North America that Native Americans intentionally shaped with distinctive characteristics that convey that the tree was shaped by human activity rather than deformed by nature or disease. A massive network of constructed pre-Columbian roads and trails have been well documented across the Americas, and in many places remnants can still be found of trails used by hunters and gatherers. One unique characteristic of the trail marker tree is a horizontal bend several feet off the ground, which makes it visible at greater distances, even in snow. Even today, modern hunters look for horizontal shapes while hunting deer, elk, and moose. Dr. Janssen noted in 1941:

Among the many crooked trees encountered, only a few are Indian trail markers. The casual observer often experiences difficulty in distinguishing between accidentally deformed trees and those ... purposely bent by the Indians. Deformities may occur in many ways. A large tree may fall upon a sapling, pinning it down for a sufficient length of time to establish a permanent bend. Lightning may split a trunk, causing a portion to fall or lean in such a way as to resemble an Indian marker. Wind, sleet snow or depredations by animals may cause accidental deformities in trees. However, such injuries leave scars which are apparent to the careful observer, and these may serve in distinguishing such trees from Indian trail markers.

Large trees that exhibit deformed growth and distinctive forms bent in a vertical plane are sometimes labeled trail trees, marker trees, thong trees, or signal trees by enthusiasts. Historically, these unique trees were commonly known as Indian trail trees. Proponents of trail tree lore claim these unique forms are culturally modified trees used to mark trails or important places. Distinctively bent trees have long been noted throughout the Temperate Deciduous Forest of eastern North America. The extent to which indigenous peoples used such trees as navigational aids, and whether such trees were formed by anthropogenic or natural means is controversial.

These distinctively shaped trees have been photographed and documented in the Great Lakes Region by scientists and historians since the early 1800s.

== Examples of documented trail marker trees ==
The trail tree known as first oak trail marker tree near Monterey, Tennessee, is one of two trail marker trees on private property near Monterey, Tennessee. The town of Monterey was originally named Standing Stone. Traditional Native American ceremonies are still held to honor the standing stone in Monterey.

The trail tree known as white oak marker tree in Traverse City, Michigan, is a traditional trail marker tree and has been protected by the people of Traverse City for decades. This tree is in the Civic Center, one of two that stood in the park. This remaining tree has been protected by the local historians. There have been ceremonies performed at the tree and a wrought iron fence has been erected to protect this treasured landmark.

The trail marker tree in White County, Indiana, is one of two enormous white oak trail marker trees in the county and is estimated to be over 350 years old. These trees are on private property, cared for and protected by the homeowners and assisted by the community out of respect to the Native Americans. In an article published by The Indiana Historian, September 2001, a Miami elder and teacher spoke "that there are fewer than a handful of these 'Trail Trees' left in Indiana today. These special gifts were made for our People as they journeyed to find their way back home to the loved ones in the circle. Intentionally bent, this magnificent tree still stands." In regard to this historic tree, a Native American in White County named Buffalo Heart referred to the ancient tree as "Grandfather" and recounted numerous trail marker trees throughout White County from her childhood. Much of the early research in this area in Indiana was by historian Marilyn Abbott, according to Madden and Dold in the 175th anniversary of White County.

The trail tree known as trail marker tree in Michigan was shaped in 1930 at the direction of park designer Herbert F. Larson Sr. by two Ojibwe men: "When Larson asked the two Indian men to retrace the old trail, Larson would have insisted (by his known interest in Ojibwe culture), that they mark the trail in Indian fashion rather than by cemented rock stanchions or metal rebar."

== Anthropogenic interpretation ==
Proponents of trail tree lore believe that a widespread cultural practice among northeastern and southeastern groups of indigenous peoples of the Americas placed sign posts in the North American wilderness by intentionally bending and securing selected saplings to force deformed growth oriented to indicate directions to resources or along trails. Each manipulated sapling was intended to survive, to grow large and to retain its shape becoming part of an extensive land and water navigational system designed to help them find their way in wild landscapes throughout forested areas of North America. This navigational system is presumed to have been already in place before the arrival of the first Europeans.

Trail marker trees provided a form of land and water navigation originating from Native American tribes throughout North America. Trail marker trees designated areas of significant importance to Native Americans including council circles and gathering points. A well defined council circle, the Greensky Council Trees still exists to this day shaped by the Odawa tribe in 1830 and is located in Northern Michigan. They altered the trees in traditional Odawa fashion to mark the location: to honor this location that had been and would continue to be sacred to their people. Each of these trees takes a sharp bend away from the center of the circle at a height of eight feet and then turns up again; a dramatic and elegant designation.

The first report of trail marker trees, in what is now the State of Illinois, appeared in a document called Map of Ouilmette Reservation with its Indian Reminders dated 1828–1844. This map shows actual drawings and locations of existing trail marker trees. Even after the indigenous population was removed in the 1830s by the Indian Removal Act, pioneers in this area kept the knowledge of the trail marker trees alive by direct contact with many Northwest Territory tribes. At the beginning of the 1900s, articles, books, special events, and installation of bronze plaques at known Indian trail tree sites began to appear. These historic trees were now becoming recognized as historically significant landmarks for navigation presumed shaped and used by Native Americans. The first recorded plaque was dedicated by the Chicago Chapter of the Daughters of the American Revolution on May 6, 1911 at the northernmost edge of Cook County, Illinois. There are eleven similarly shaped trees in succession pointing the direction of the Indian trails near the famous Green Bay Trail. Recorded in the original Federal survey of 1838, on the narrow path from Chicago to Milwaukee, two identifiable trail marker trees once stood clearly marking the route north. The abundance of trail marker trees in the Great Lakes region was a direct result of its central location and need to navigate between the Great Lakes, dense forests and river systems that existed in this area. Trail marker trees served Indigenous Americans as they traveled the river systems and lakes, acting as points of exit to portage routes or trails.

In the Illinois Country, later part of the Northwest Territory, this custom of shaping the trees by hand was passed on directly from the local tribes to the North American fur trade inhabiting this region from the 1700s. These culturally altered living landmarks appeared in several forms, each conveying a distinctive message to their creator. Trail marker trees differed from tribe to tribe. Their uses varied from pointing out a fresh water source off a main route, to indicating exposed deposits of flint, copper, lead and other mineral resources that may have been important to Native American for medicinal and ceremonial purposes, including the shaping of council circles. This system was also used to exit rivers and creeks at portage points or link them to other major trails. A trail marker tree high on a river bank was easily visible, even during floods, which occurred often.

Native Americans chose trees mainly from the hardwood family in their region. They most commonly shaped oak and maple trees—due to their flexibility when young, and their permanence and ability to retain shape. They bent trees over to form an arch, and secured them to a stake in the ground or tied them to a large stone with a leather strap or vine. They left a new branch to grow skyward from the top of the arch, forming a new trunk. Eventually they removed the old trunk, leaving a knob, a distinctive characteristic of trail marker trees. In a culture based on hunting and gathering, the hunter was trained from childhood to recognize horizontal shapes in the forest in hopes that it was wild game. The distinctive horizontal characteristic made the trail marker tree easily recognizable. The shape itself not only stood out horizontally in a vertical world at approximately the height of game, but also was visible above snowfall in the Great Lakes region.

== Controversy ==
Controversy has followed trail tree lore since the beginnings of its popularity early in the Twentieth Century. One early protest, in the form of a letter to the editor of the Chicago Record-Herald dated November 10, 1911, presents points of contention that should be considered today. George H. Holt objected to the placement and dedication of a bronze tablet at the site of a deformed tree claimed to be an Indian Trail Tree and adopted by his community November 7, 1911. Following publishing of Holt's letter, Valentine Smith, Head Regent of the Fort Dearborn Chapter of the Daughters of the American Revolution, offered a rebuttal, citing authorities who supported the plaque. Holt wrote:

To the Editor: The erection of a bronze tablet to mark "The Indian Trail Tree" at Glencoe ought not to pass unchallenged. It may be a pity to spoil a petty conceit, but it is much worse to invent a historical incident and to commemorate it by a tablet which must always discredit the perpetrators, the intelligence of the period and the trustworthiness of history.

I personally remember the time when that tree was erect and when a whirlwind or severe wind passed over that section and split and bent the tree at the fork, leaving a portion of it still erect and the broken portion of it as it is today, the only change being that the tree has grown. Other trees were broken and uprooted at the same time. The attention of many persons was attracted to this particular tree because it was close to the railroad and because it survived the shock, and it became a matter of interest from year to year to note whether the broken portion of the tree would continue to live. There are probably many persons living along the north shore who remember the incident.

If there were no living witnesses to the incident, the theory advanced would be indefensible upon three grounds:

First—A tree does not grow upward in the manner assumed by the inventor of the "discovery." The broken portion of the tree is at the same height today as it was when it was broken. Most people know that a tree does not grow upward as a man grows.

Second—Any Indian who was so ignorant of woodcraft as to conceive of marking a trail by bending over a limb and fastening it to the ground in the manner indicated in this tablet, would have been the laughing stock of every other Indian.

Third—There was a practicable road traveled by horses and teams, between Milwaukee and Chicago, within plain sight of this "Trail Tree" eighty years ago, and there were other settlers along that road from whom the Indians might have inquired the way, if they had lost it. The configuration of the country is such that no Indian, even a hundred years ago or more, would have thought of using a trail running in the direction indicated, because it would lead him into rough and heavily wooded country, traversed by ravines and leading nowhere, when he could far more easily have followed the sand ridge and kept out of the woods and the mud.

There are many other reasons which might be given for discrediting this invention of a historical event that never happened and commemorating it with a tablet that must occasion ridicule as long as it exists. – George H. Holt.

The following is Valentine Smith's rebuttal. Her letter mentions 'authorities' on the subject, such as Frank R. Grover of the Evanston Historical Society, and Jens Jensen (landscape architect), a well known landscape architect at the time and spokesperson at the Blackstone Hotel for the unveiling of the tablet on May 6, 1911.

Valentine Smith wrote:

"Trail Tree" Tablet. Chicago, Nov 15.

To the Editor: As chairman of the committee of the Chicago Daughters of the American Revolution which erected this bronze table, I have decided to reply to the criticisms of George H. Holt.

Mr. Holt stands alone in his contentions. I think he must have mistaken the tree, because his memory would be almost superhuman if he ever saw the pointing branch of that tree stand upright. We have not acted without consulting authorities. Frank R. Grover, vice president of the Evanston Historical Society, read a paper on Indian trail markers before the Chicago Historical Society on Feb. 21, 1905. His paper can be found on pages 267-8 of the publication of that society. He said that at various points along the north shore, following the old Indian trails, trees were still to be found which had evidently been bent and tied down as saplings to mark the Indian trails. The trees, he said, were invariably large, which indicated that they had been bent over a century ago. One of the trees he mentioned was selected by the committee to support the tablet.

The "pointing branch' of this tree was not broken, but bent. The fiber of the wood leaves no doubt of this fact. The same even curve to be observed in the fiber was to be discerned in the bark before relic hunters stripped it bare. A whirlwind would not have left the tree in this condition.

Mr. Holt is evidently unaware of the existence of three other trees along the same trail from Lakeside station south to Hubbard's woods. Each tree has its pointing branch and all are white elms. They are arranged so systematically that they tell their own story. Moreover, the use of "trail" trees so marked is not doubted by Jens Jensen a member of the outer park belt commission, City Forester Prost and other experts.

== See also ==
- Lob trees
