= Voyageurs =

French Canadians who engaged in the North American fur trade

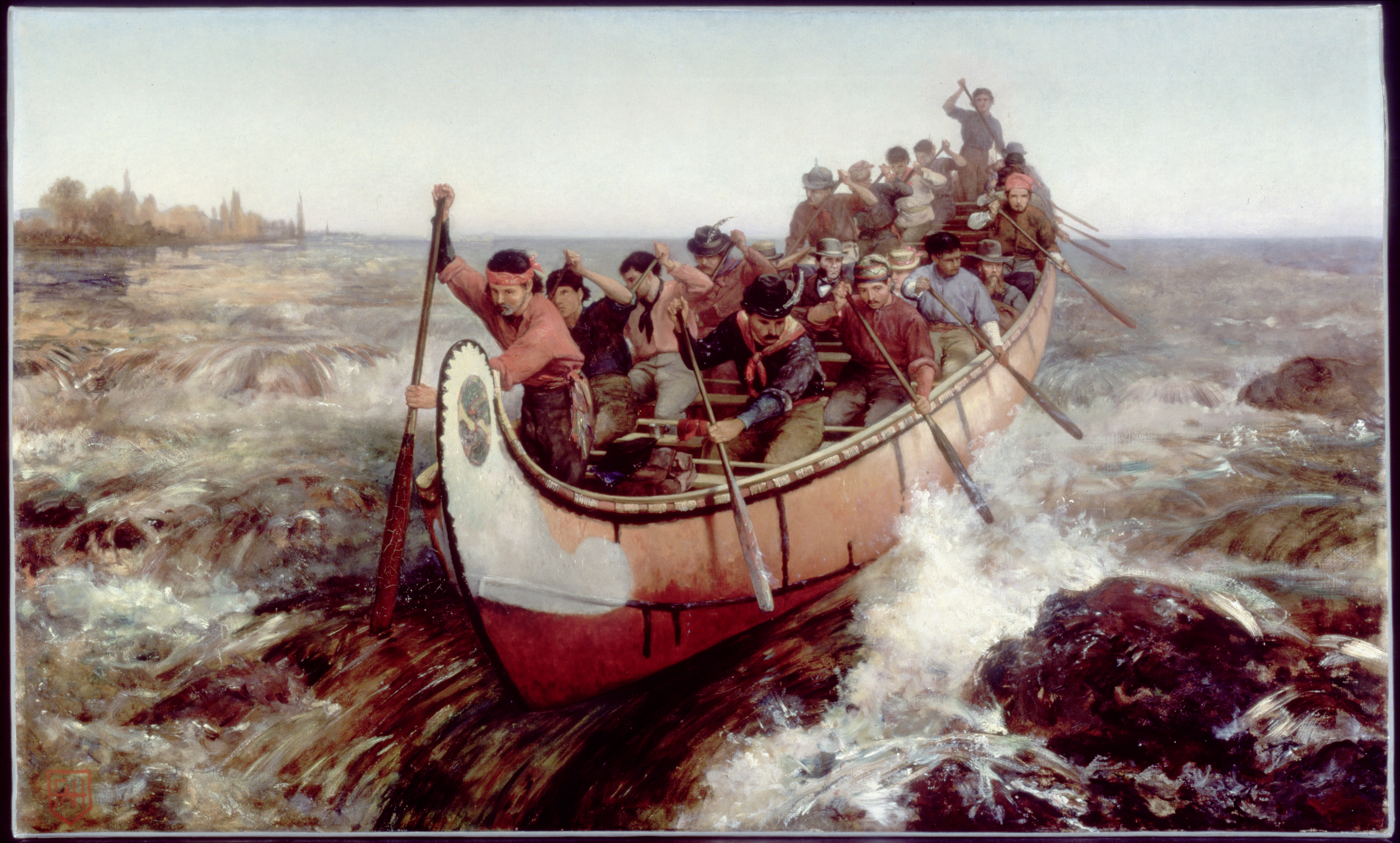
Shooting the Rapids, 1879 by Frances Anne Hopkins (1838–1919)

Voyageurs (French: [vwajaʒœʁ]; lit. 'travellers') were 18th- and 19th-century French people and later French Canadians who transported furs by canoe at the peak of the North American fur trade. The emblematic meaning of the term applies to places (New France, including the Pays d'en Haut and the Pays des Illinois) and times where that transportation was over long distances, giving rise to folklore and music that celebrated voyageurs' strength and endurance. They traversed and explored many regions in what is now Canada and the United States.

Despite their fame, their lives were arduous and not nearly as glamorous as folk tales made out. For example, they had to be able to carry two 90-pound (41 kg) bundles of fur over portages. Some carried four or five, and there is a report of a voyageur carrying seven bundles for half a mile. Hernias were common and frequently caused death. Most voyageurs started working in their early twenties and continued working until in their sixties. They never made enough money to consider early retirement from a physically grueling lifestyle.

Fur trading was done by canoe and largely by French Canadians. In the fur trade context, the word also applied, to a lesser extent, to other fur trading activities. Voyageurs were part of a licensed, organized effort, a distinction that set them apart from the coureurs des bois. Additionally, they differed from engagés (hired men, actually indentured servants), who were much smaller-scale merchants and general laborers. Mostly immigrants, the engagés were men required to go anywhere and do anything their masters told them as long as their indentureship was still in place. Until their contract expired, engagés were servants of their masters, who were most often voyageurs. Fewer than fifty percent of engagés remained in New France when their contracts ended. The others either returned to France or died while indentured. After the French presence in Canada ended following the British conquest during the Seven Years' War, fur trade was still continued by their descendants.

== History ==
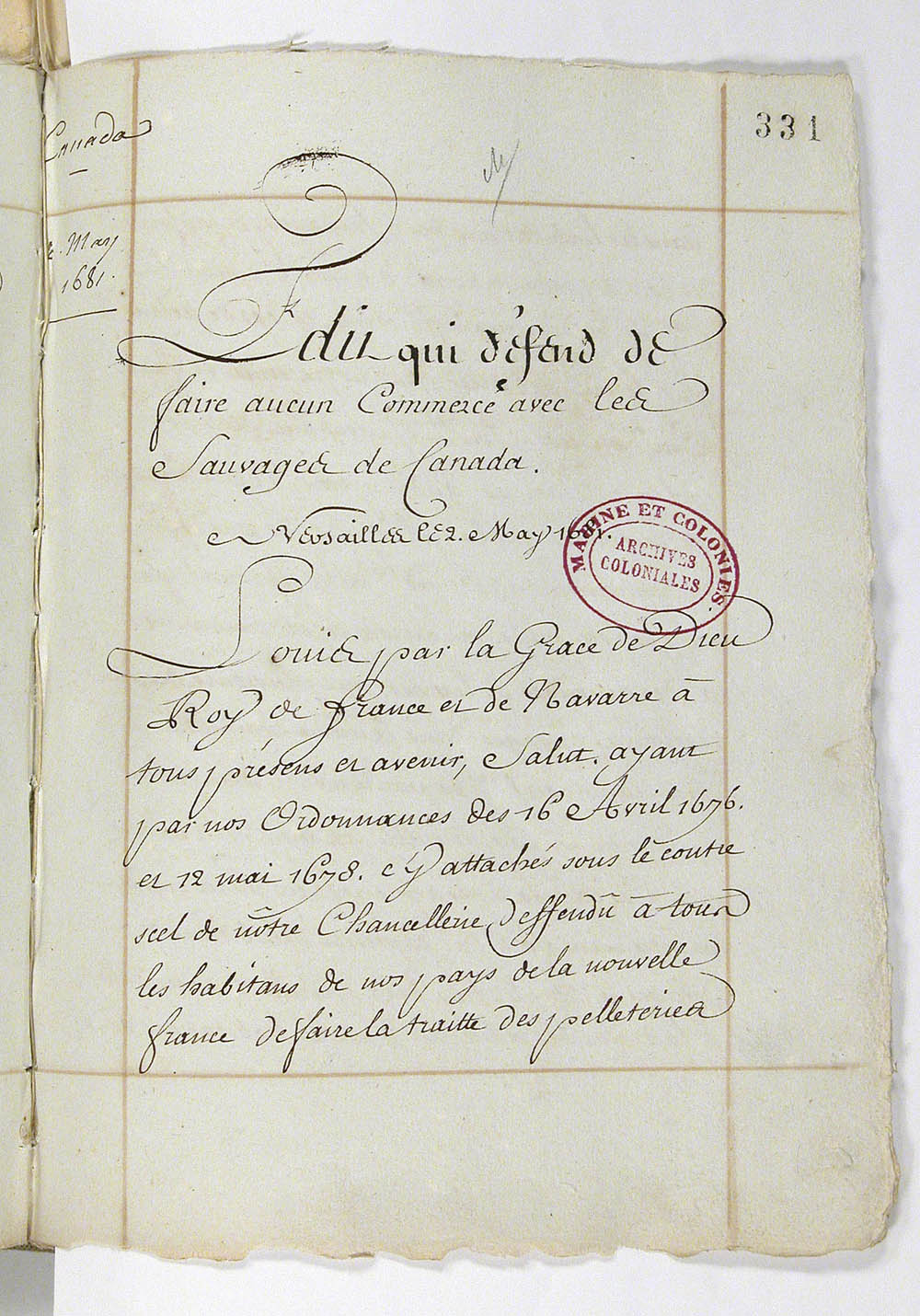
Photo of the Edict that King Louis XIV passed limiting who could participate in the fur trade

The early European fur trade with Indigenous peoples was not limited to beaver pelts. Beavers were not particularly valued and people preferred "fancy fur" or "fur that is used with or on the pelt". The fur trade was viewed as secondary to fishing during this era. The earliest North American fur trading did not include long-distance transportation of the furs after they were obtained by trade with the First Nations; it started with trading near settlements or along the coast or waterways accessible by ship. Soon, coureurs des bois achieved business advantages by travelling further inland to trade. By 1681, King Louis XIV decided to control the traders by publishing an edict that banned fur and pelt trading in New France.

As the trading process moved deeper into the wilderness, transportation of the furs (and the products to be traded for furs) became a larger part of the fur trading business process. The authorities began a process of issuing permits (congés). Those travellers associated with the canoe transportation part of the licensed endeavour became known as voyageurs, a term which literally means "traveller" in French. The fur trade was thus controlled by a small number of Montreal merchants. New France began a policy of expansion in an attempt to dominate the trade. French influence extended west, north, and south. Forts and trading posts were built with the help of explorers and traders. Treaties were negotiated with native groups, and fur trading became very profitable and organized. The system became complex, and the voyageurs, many of whom had been independent traders, slowly became hired laborers.

By the late 17th century, a trade route through and beyond the Great Lakes had been opened. The Hudson's Bay Company opened in 1670. The North West Company opened in 1784, exploring as far west and north as Lake Athabasca. By the late 18th century, demand in Europe grew substantially for marten, otter, lynx, mink and especially beaver furs, expanding the trade and adding thousands to the ranks of voyageurs. The American Fur Company, owned and operated by John Jacob Astor, was founded in 1808. By 1830, the American Fur Company had grown to monopolize and control the American fur industry.

Map of New France (blue color) in 1750

From the beginning of the fur trade in the 1680s until the late 1870s, the voyageurs were the blue-collar workers of the Montreal fur trade. At their height in the 1810s, they numbered as many as three thousand. For the most part, voyageurs were the crews hired to man the canoes that carried trade goods and supplies to trading locations where they were exchanged for furs, and "rendezvous posts," such as Grand Portage at the western end of Lake Superior. They then transported the furs back to Lachine near Montreal, and later also to points on the route to Hudson Bay. Some voyageurs stayed in the back country over the winter and transported the trade goods from the posts to farther away French outposts. These men were known as the hivernants (winterers). They also helped negotiate trade in indigenous communities. In the spring they would carry furs from these remote outposts back to the rendezvous posts. Voyageurs also served as guides for explorers such as Pierre La Vérendrye. The majority of these canoe men were French Canadian; they were usually from Island of Montreal or seigneuries and parishes along or near the Saint Lawrence River; many others were from France.

Voyageurs were mostly illiterate and therefore did not leave many written documents. The only known document left behind for posterity by a voyageur was penned by John Mongle who belonged to the parish of Maskinongé. He most likely used the services of a clerk to send letters to his wife. These chronicle his voyages into mainland territories in quest of furs.

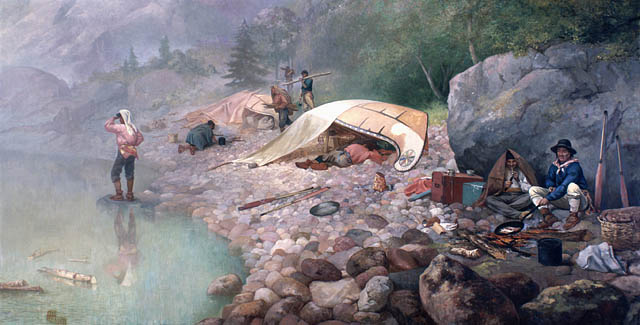
Voyageurs at Dawn, 1871 by Frances Anne Hopkins (1838–1919)

Three major influences molded the lives of voyageurs. First, their background of French-Canadian heritage as farmers featured prominently in their jobs as voyageurs. Working as a voyageur was seen as a temporary means of earning additional income to support their families and expand their farms. Most voyageurs were born in New France. However, fur trading was not an everyday experience for most of the colonial population. Roughly two thirds of the population did not have any involvement in the fur trade. The second influence came from indigenous communities. Voyageurs learned from indigenous people how to survive in the regions they travelled and adopted many traditional methods and technologies. Voyageurs also brought Western materials and techniques that were valued by the communities they encountered. The final influence was the social structure of the voyageurs life. Since this group was limited to men, it was highly masculine. These men engaged in activities such as gambling, drinking, fighting; interests which were reserved for men of this trade.

=== Types: voyageurs, explorateurs, and coureurs des bois ===
The terms voyageur, explorateur, and coureur des bois have had broad and overlapping uses, but their meanings in the context of the fur trade business were more distinct. Voyageurs were canoe transportation workers in organized, licensed long-distance transportation of furs and trade goods in the interior of the continent. Coureurs de bois were entrepreneurial woodsmen engaged in all aspects of fur trading rather than just transportation of furs and trade goods. The coureurs de bois came before the voyageurs, and were partially replaced by them. For those coureurs des bois who continued, the term picked up the additional meaning of "unlicensed". Another name sometimes given to voyageurs is engagés, indicating a hired wage-earner.

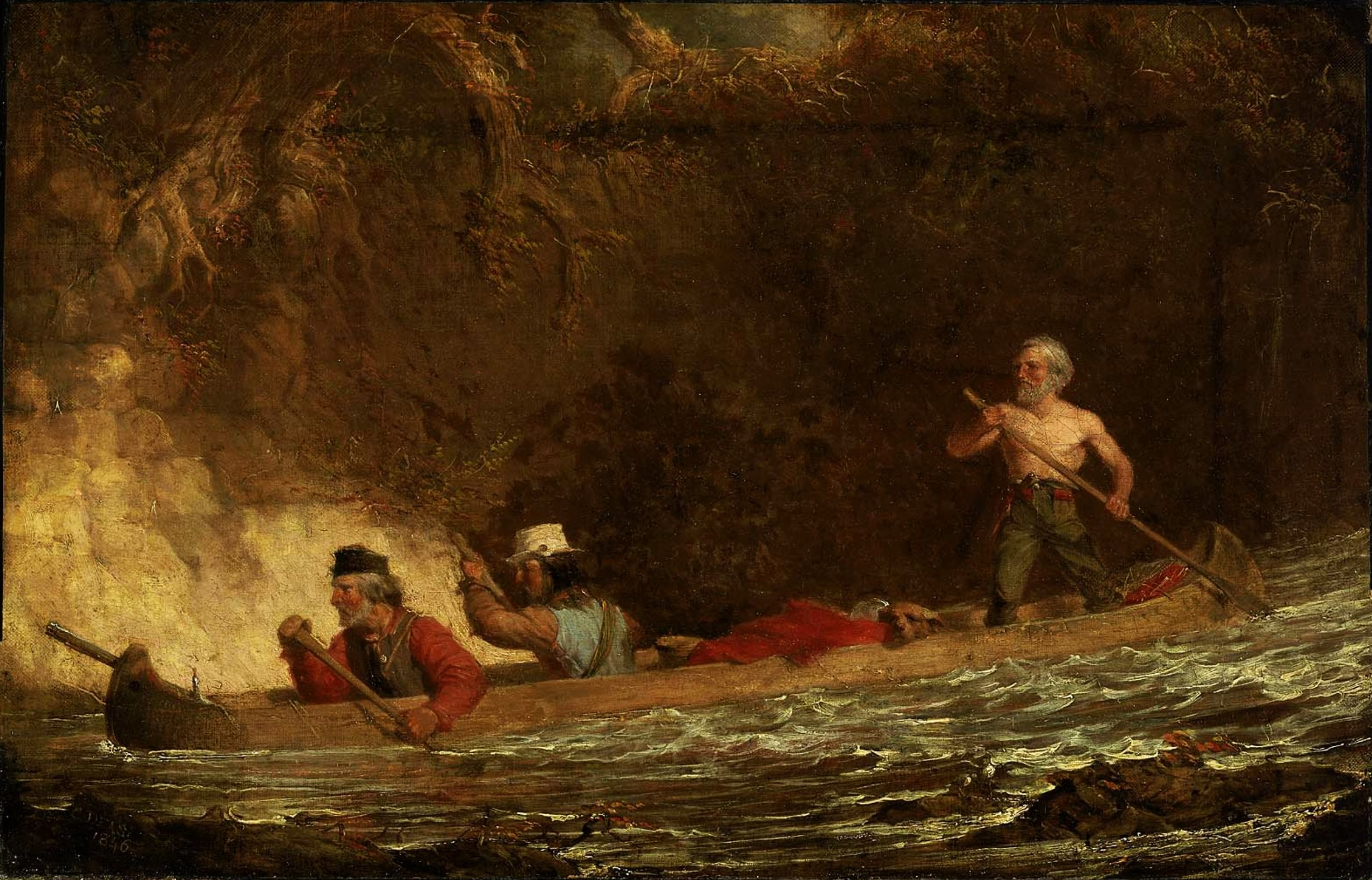
The Voyageurs, 1846 by Charles Deas

There were several types of voyageurs, depending on the job that they carried out. Because of their diet, which consisted largely of salt pork, voyageurs who travelled only between Montreal and Grand Portage were known as mangeurs de lard (pork eaters) a derogatory term. These men were seasonal workers employed mostly during the summer months to transport goods which could weigh as much as four tonnes by canoe. Up to ten men could be required to safely navigate with so much on board. They would travel to the western end of Lake Superior to drop off their goods. Those who overwintered were called hommes du nord (northern men) or hivernants (winterers). Those who were neither primarily traveled the interior (beyond Grand Portage) without wintering in it. They would pick up the goods from Lake Superior and transport them inland over large distances. Because of their experience, approximately one-third of the mangeurs de lard became hommes du nord.

=== Value to the fur trade industry ===
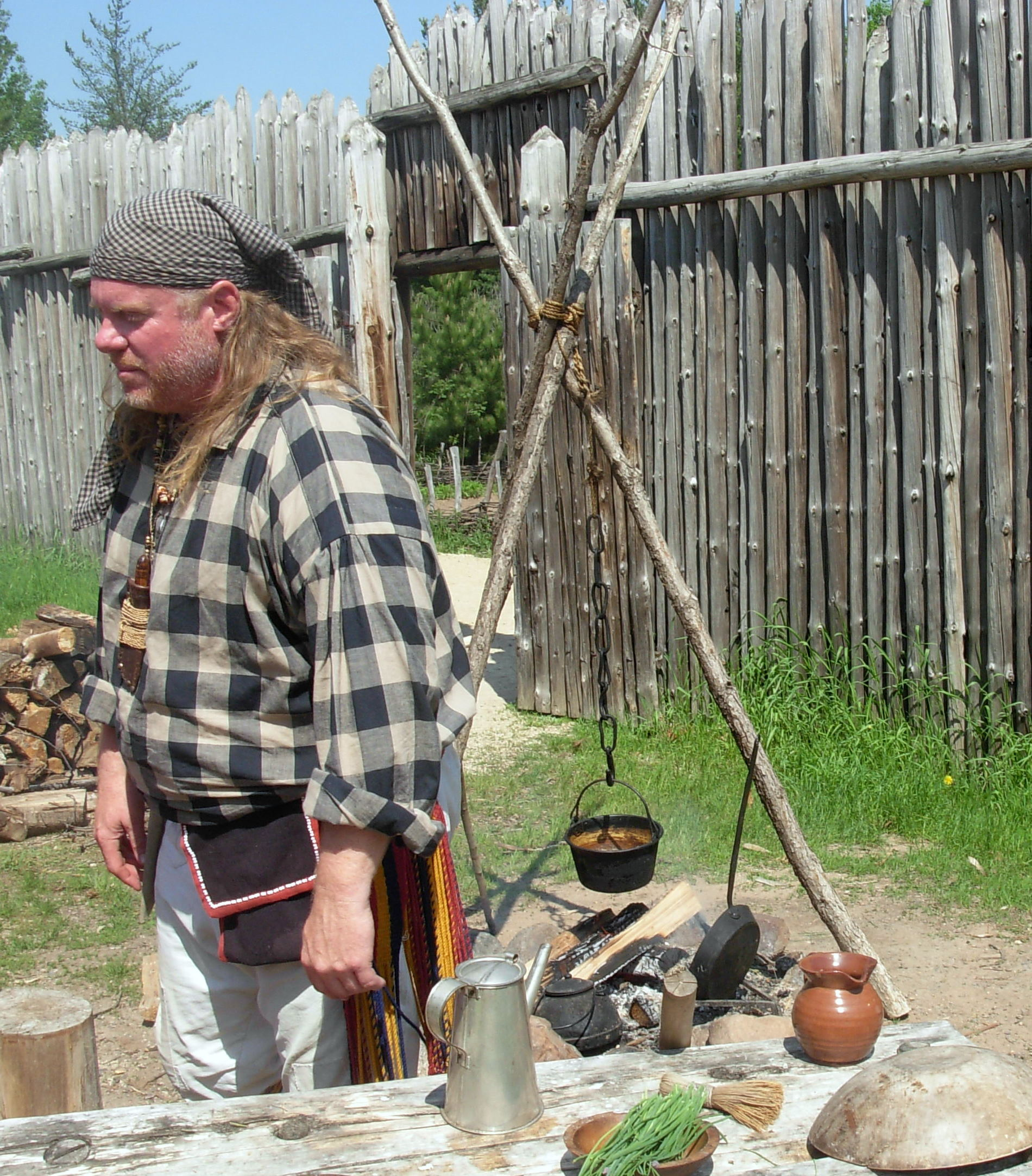
Contemporary actor costumed as a voyageur at a Minnesota historic site

The voyageurs worked for trading companies such as the North West Company (NWC) and the Hudson's Bay Company (HBC). They retrieved furs from all over North America but were especially important in the rugged Athabasca region. Athabasca was one of the most profitable fur-trade regions in the colonies because pelts from further north were thicker and of superior quality to those trapped further south.

Originally the HBC was content to stay close to its trading posts along the shores of Hudson Bay and have indigenous trading partners bring the pelts to them. However, once the NWC began sending voyageurs into Athabasca it became easier for indigenous trappers to simply trade with them than to make the long trek to Hudson Bay. As a result, Colin Robertson sent a message to the HBC London Committee in 1810 suggesting that they begin hiring French Canadian voyageurs of their own:

I would warmly recommend to your notice the Canadians; these people I believe, are the best voyageurs in the world; they are spirited, enterprising, & extremely fond of the Country; they are easily commanded; never will you have any difficulty in setting a place with them Men; however dismal the prospect is for subsistence, they follow their Master wherever he goes.

By 1815, the HBC took his advice and began hiring substantial numbers of French-Canadian voyageurs for trading expeditions into Athabasca. Colin Robertson led the first of these HBC expeditions and claimed to have difficulty hiring voyageurs in Montreal because of NWC efforts to thwart him. The NWC realized how important the voyageurs were to their success and were unwilling to give them up easily. This competition for experienced labour between the HBC and the NWC created the largest demand for voyageurs in Montreal since before the merger of the XY Company and the NWC.

James H. Baker was once told by an unnamed retired voyageur:

I could carry, paddle, walk and sing with any man I ever saw. I have been twenty-four years a canoe man, and forty-one years in service; no portage was ever too long for me, fifty songs could I sing. I have saved the lives of ten voyageurs, have had twelve wives and six running dogs. I spent all of my money in pleasure. Were I young again, I would spend my life the same way over. There is no life so happy as a voyageur's life!

=== British era ===
After the British conquered Canada in 1763, management of the Montreal trade was taken over by English speakers, while the trapping and physical labour continued to be done by French Canadians. The independent coureurs des bois continued to be replaced by hired voyageurs. Since the west country was too far for a round trip in one season, each spring when the ice broke up, boats set out from Montreal and winterers started east. They exchanged their goods at Grand Portage on Lake Superior and returned before the rivers froze five months later. To save the cost of hauling food from Montreal, Métis around Winnipeg began large-scale production of pemmican. The Hudson Bay trade was diverted southwest to the edge of the prairie, where pemmican was picked up to feed the voyageurs on their journey northwest to the Athabasca country. Competition from the NWC forced the HBC to build posts in the interior. The two companies competed for a while then merged in 1821. Management was taken over by the capital-rich HBC, but trading methods were those of the Montreal-based NWC voyageurs.

=== Fading and end of the voyageur era ===
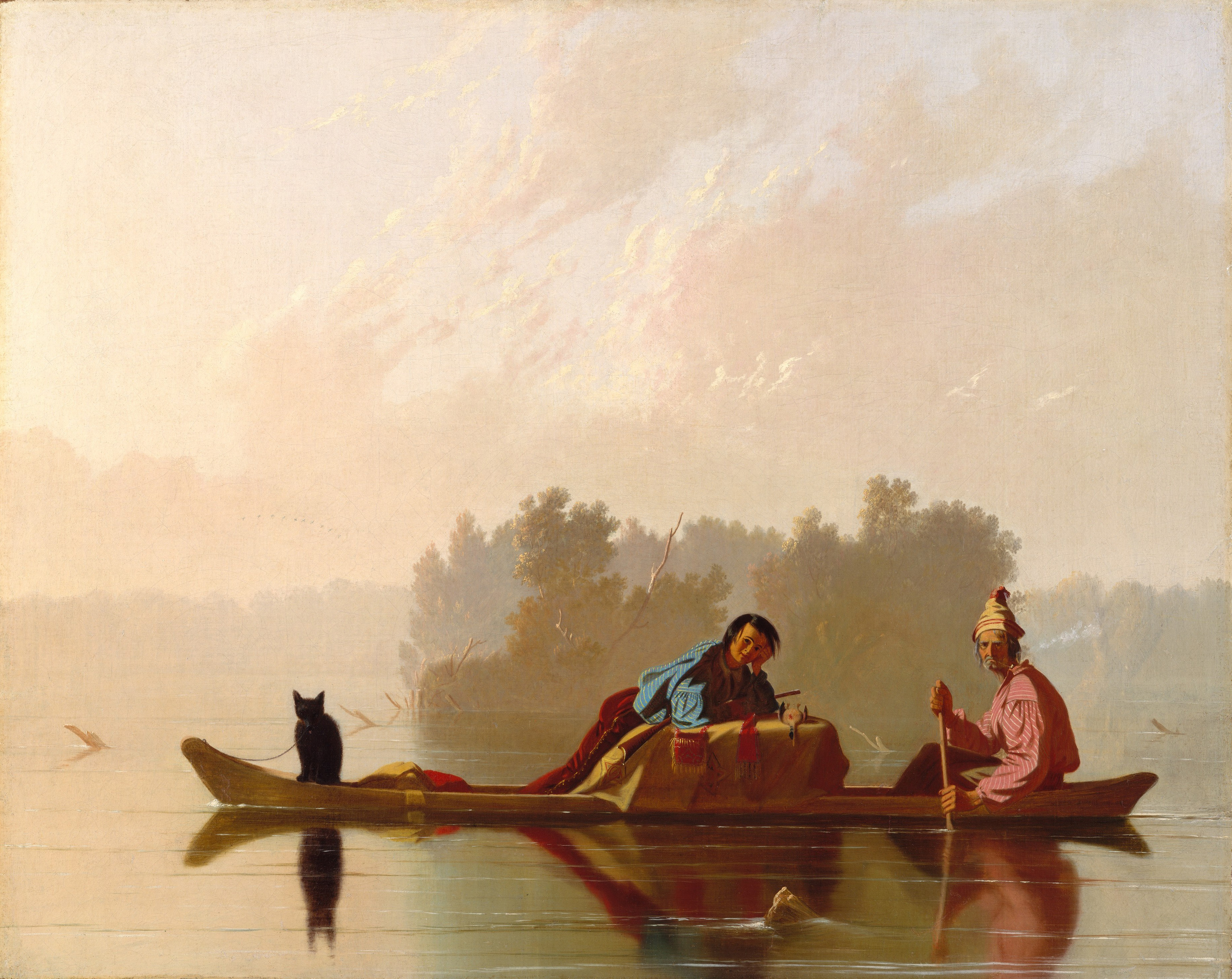
Fur Traders Descending the Missouri (1845) by George Caleb Bingham, originally titled French Trader & Half-Breed Son

After the merger of the NWC and HBC, much trade shifted to York Factory (the Hudson Bay route) and later some went south to Minnesota. After 1810, the western posts were linked to British bases on the Oregon coast. By mid-century the HBC ruled an inland empire that stretched from Hudson Bay to the Pacific. The Carlton Trail became a land route across the prairies. HBC land claims were transferred to Canada by the Rupert's Land Act 1868. From 1874 the North-West Mounted Police began to extend formal government into the area. The fur trade routes grew obsolete starting in the 1880s, with the coming of railways and steamships.

Several factors led to the end of the voyageur era. Improved transportation methods lessened the need to transport of furs and trade goods by canoe. The presence and eventual dominance of the Hudson Bay York boat-based entry into the fur trade areas eliminated a significant part of the canoe travel, reducing the need for voyageurs.

Completion of the Canadian Pacific rail line in 1882 finally eliminated the need for long-distance transportation of furs by voyageurs. Also, the volume of the North American fur trade declined, although it continues to this day. Fur animals became less plentiful, and demand for furs dropped. Products such as silk became popular and replaced beaver fur, reducing the fur trade further. With the completion of the railway and the closure of Fort William as a rendezvous point, both occurring in 1892, that year is considered by some to mark the end of the voyageur era. Later, many French Canadians stayed in the bush for the prospecting and mineral exploration trades that grew from the middle of the 19th century into viable industries, especially in Northern Ontario.

Nonetheless, the voyageurs enjoyed one prominent revival in the minds of the British public – at the end of 1884, Field Marshal Garnet Wolseley was dispatched to Khartoum with the Nile Expedition to relieve Major General Charles George Gordon, who had been besieged by the Islamist Mahdist movement. Wolseley demanded the services of the voyageurs and insisted that he could not travel up the Blue Nile without the voyageurs to assist his men as river pilots and boatmen. The demand for the voyageurs, however, slowed down the British response, and ultimately the relief of Khartoum came two days too late.

== Travels ==
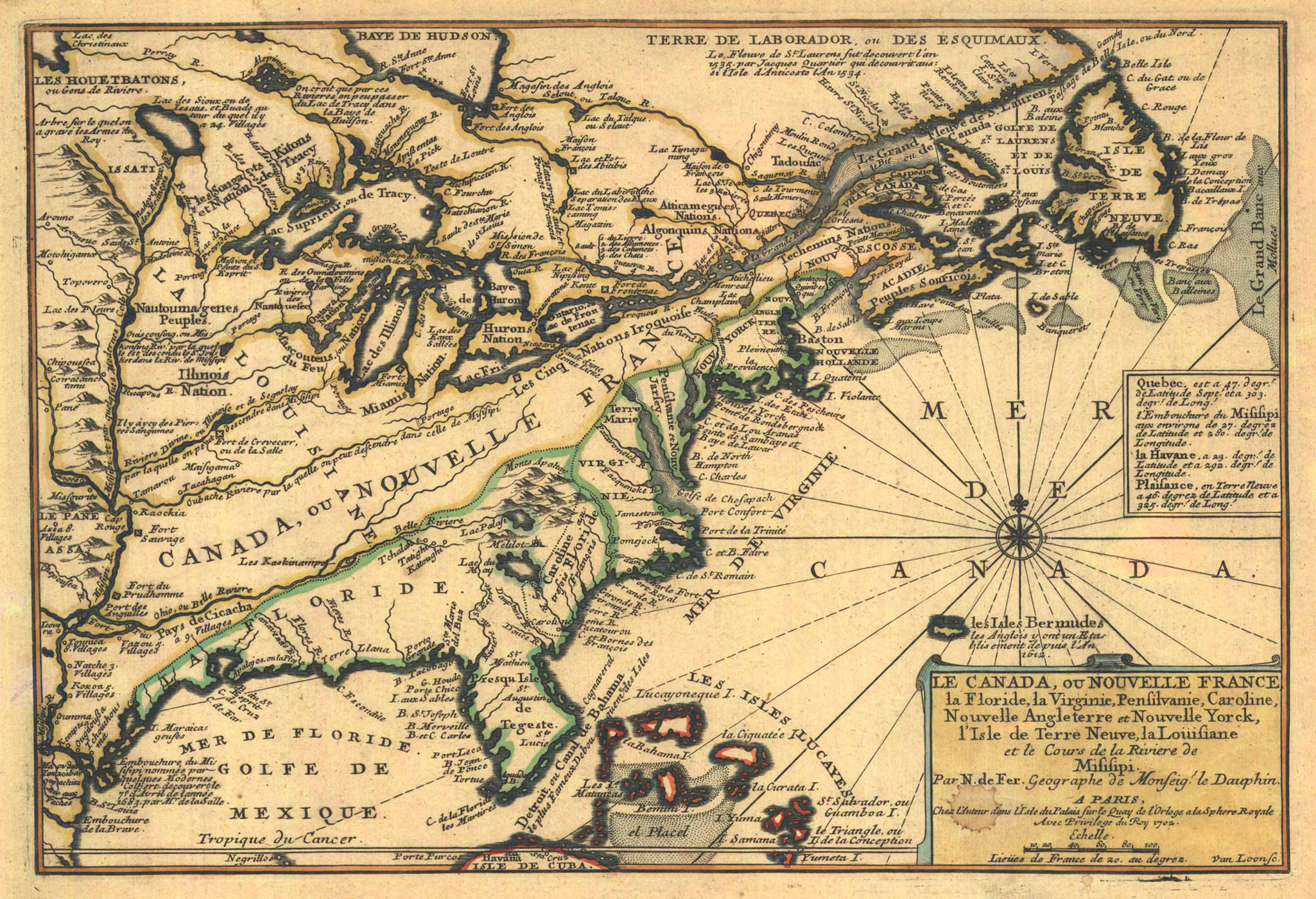
Map of North America in 1701 which includes Native American controlled territory

The voyageur's routes were longer distance fur trade water routes that ships and large boats could not reach or could not travel. The canoes travelled along well-established routes. These routes were explored and used by Europeans early in the history of the settlement of the continent. Most led to Montreal. Later many led to Hudson Bay. Hudson Bay and Montreal routes joined in the interior, particularly at Lake Winnipeg. The 1821 merger of the NWC and HBC resulted in a shift towards using the route with direct access to the ocean, the Hudson's Bay route, away from the Great Lakes route.

=== Routes ===
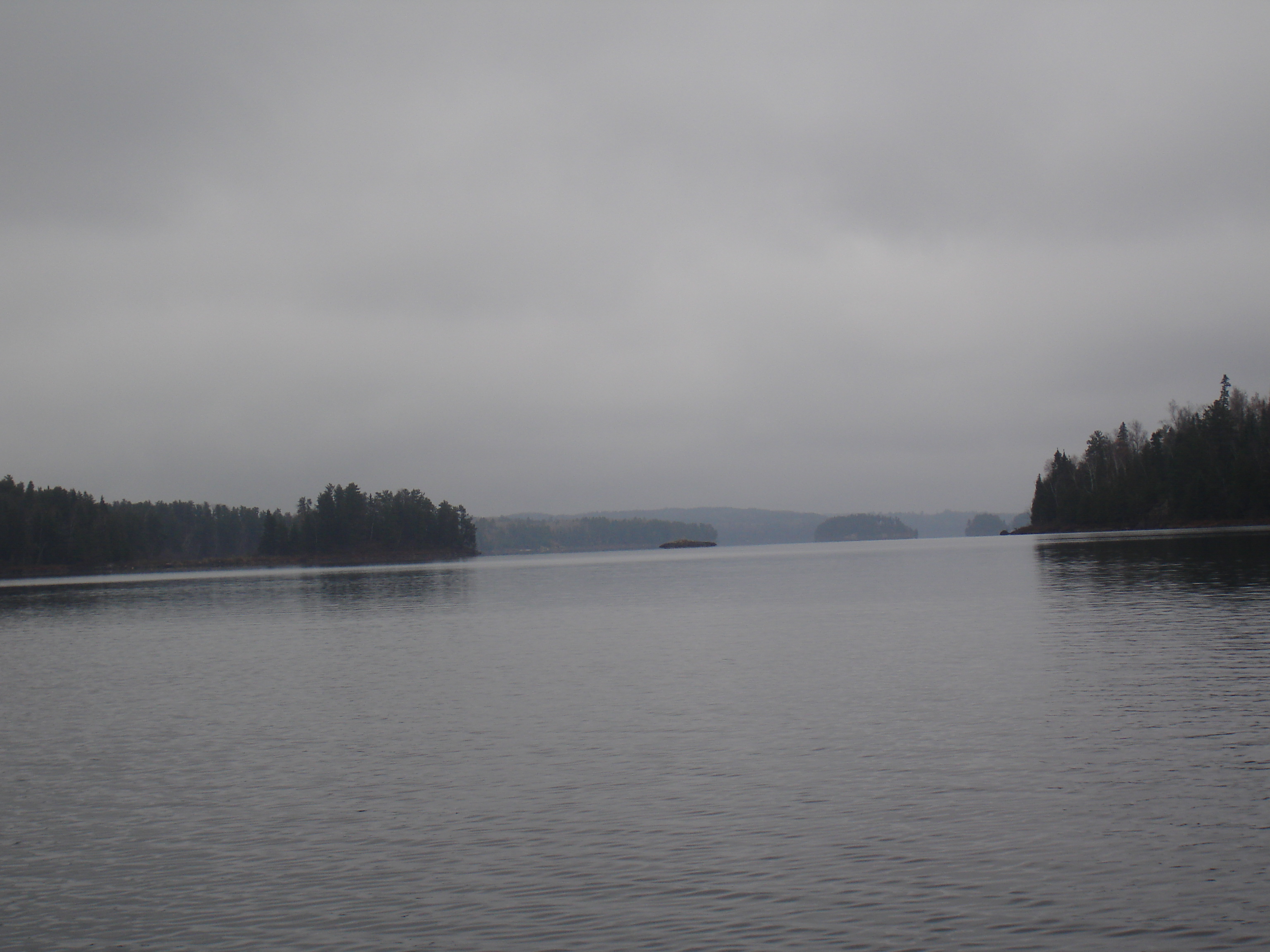
Quetico Superior, the voyageurs' route from Grand Portage to Lac la Croix

Both shores of Lake Superior had been explored by the 1660s. By the late 17th century Europeans had wintered on Rainy Lake west of Lake Superior, and by the 1730s regular routes led west from Lake Superior. Montreal was a main origination point for voyageur routes into the interior. From Montreal the route divided in two routes. The main trade route from Montreal went up the Ottawa River, then through rivers and smaller lakes to Lake Huron. The other followed the Saint Lawrence River and Lake Erie to Lake Huron. Grand Portage on the northwest shore of Lake Superior was the jumping-off point into the interior of the continent. It was reached with a very long portage, (nine miles) hence its name. By 1803, the NWC had moved its rendezvous point from Grand Portage slightly farther east to Fort William. In the late 18th century, Fort William supplanted Grand Portage. The trunk from Grand Portage followed what is now the U.S./Canada border, and in fact the border was largely defined by that route. The route from Fort William was slightly farther north. The two routes led to and joined at Lac La Croix. Each was a rendezvous point of sorts for the routes that reached into the interior.

The other main route started at York Factory where the Hayes River empties into Hudson Bay. It led to Norway House on Lake Winnipeg. Later, the downstream portion of this route was traversed by York boats rather than canoes.

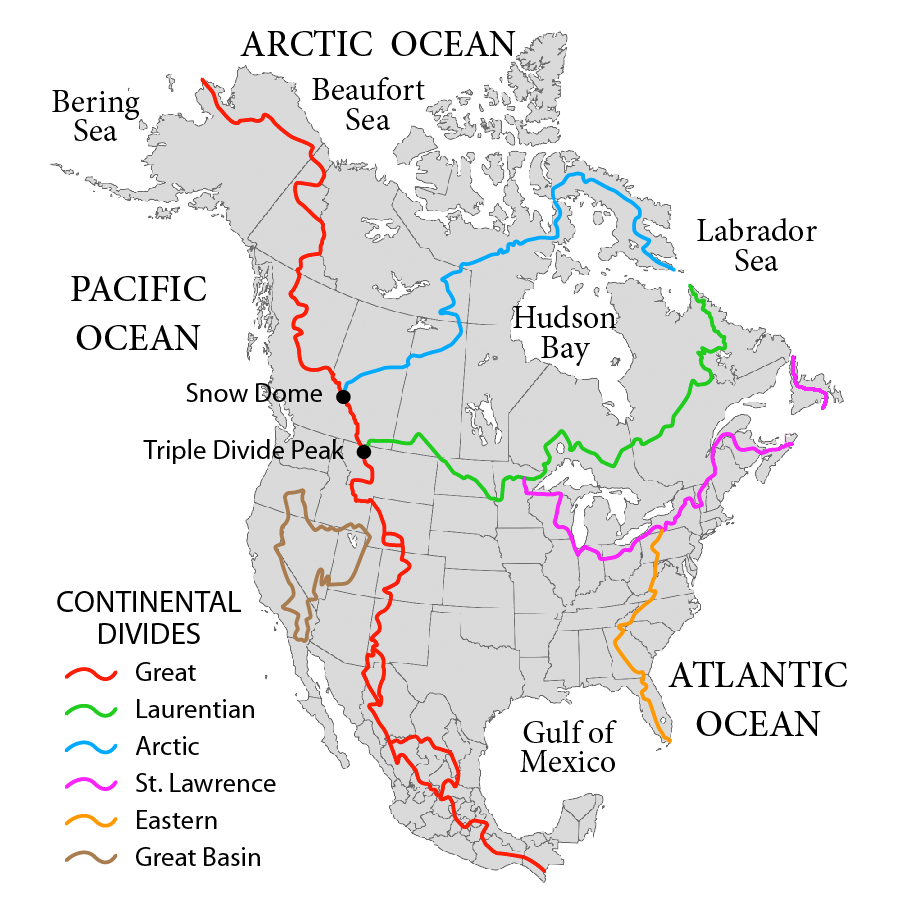
Major river basins in North America

A significant route led from Lake Winnipeg west to Cumberland House on Cumberland Lake, a hub with routes leading in four different directions. Most routes ended at the limits of what could be travelled in a round trip from a major transfer point (such as Grand Portage) in one season.

=== Canoes ===
Voyageur canoes typically were made from the bark of large paper birch trees, stretched over a frame of white cedar. The Maître canoe, or canot de maître (master's canoe), was used on the Great Lakes and the Ottawa River. It was about 36 feet (11 m) long and 6 feet (1.8 m) wide, weighed about 600 pounds (270 kg) and carried three tons of cargo or 65 90-pound (41 kg) standard packs called pièces. Their crew was 6–12; 8–10 was average. On a portage they were usually carried inverted by four men, two in front and two in the rear, using shoulder pads. When running rapids they were steered by the avant standing in front and the gouvernail standing in the rear. The northern canoe or canot du nord was used west of Lake Superior. It was about 25 feet (7.6 m) long and 4 feet (1.2 m) wide with about 18 inches (460 mm) of draft when fully loaded, and weighed about 300 pounds (140 kg). Its cargo was half or less of that of a Maître canoe, about 25–30 pièces, and its crew was 4–8, with 5–6 being average. It was carried upright by two men.

The canot bâtard (hybrid canoe) was between the Maître canoe and north canoe in size. The canoes used by Native Americans were generally smaller than the freight canoes used by the voyageurs, but could penetrate smaller streams. The express canoe was not a physical type, but a canoe used to rapidly carry messages and passengers. They had extra crew and carried no freight.

== Culture and daily life ==
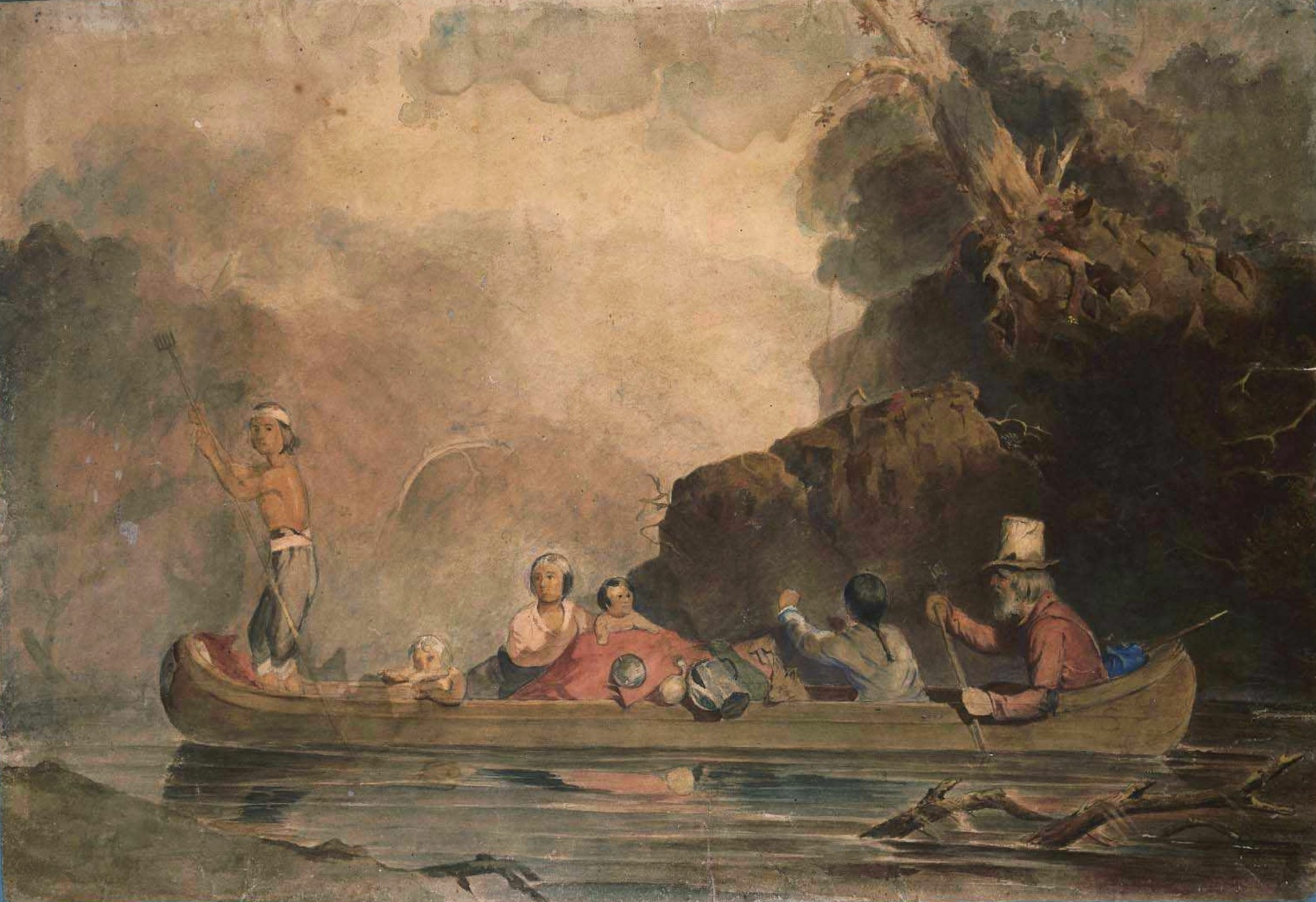
The Trapper and his Family

Voyageurs often rose as early as 2 am or 3 am. Provided that there were no rapids (requiring daylight for navigation) early in the day, they set off very early. They would stop for a few minutes each hour to smoke a pipe. Distance was often measured by "pipes", the interval between these stops. Between eight and ten in the evening, travel stopped and camp was made. Voyageurs were expected to work 14 hours per day and paddle at a rate of 55 strokes per minute. Few could swim. Many drowned in rapids or in storms while crossing lakes. Portages and routes were often indicated by lob trees, or trees that had their branches cut off just below the top of the tree.

Canoe travel included paddling on the water with all personnel and cargo, carrying the canoes and contents over land (this is called portaging). In shallow water where limited water depth prevented paddling with the cargo in the canoe but allowed canoes to be floated, methods that combined these were used, such as pulling by hand, poling, or lining with ropes. Circumstances where only an empty canoe could be floated were called a decharge. Those where the cargo could be floated in the canoe if split into two trips were called a demi-charge. There is a report of a voyageur named La Bonga, a 6-foot-5-inch (196 cm) freed slave carrying 7 bales (630 lbs.) for one-half mile when applying to become a voyageur, a feat which trumped the usual requirement that voyageurs be short.

Being a voyageur was dangerous, not just because of exposure to outdoor living, but also because of the rough work. Drowning was common, along with broken limbs, compressed spines, hernias, and rheumatism. Outdoor living also added to the hazards to life and limb with swarms of black flies and mosquitoes, often kept away by sleeping with a smudge fire that caused respiratory, sinus and eye problems. It was dangerous work, despite their expertise. David Thompson's narrative describes an attempt to run the Dalles des Morts rapids:

They preferred running the Dalles; they had not gone far, when to avoid the ridge of waves, which they ought to have kept, they took the apparent smooth water, were drawn into a whirlpool, which wheeled them around into its Vortex, the Canoe with the Men clinging to it, went down end foremost, and [they] all were drowned; at the foot of the Dalles search was made for their bodies, but only one Man was found, his body much mangled by the Rocks.

=== Masculinity, labour, and cultural identity ===
Physical labour, social class, and cultural practices influenced the experiences of male fur traders, particularly their working conditions and relationships with their employers.

The relationship between merchants and their employees was not solely one of domination by the former and submission by the latter. Although the bourgeois in the Montreal fur trade maintained control over the clerks and the voyageurs who worked for them, the latter were not entirely powerless against their masters. Rather, voyageurs often expressed discontent with their working conditions, engaged in slow work, stole provisions from their employers, and even deserted. Although their actions did not succeed in fundamentally altering the unequal relationship between employers and employees, they did indicate that the voyageurs were able to negotiate certain aspects of their relations with the merchants and their clerks.

Additionally, the experience of the voyageur was in part defined by his labour and the class structure of the fur trade, primarily the contrast between the bourgeois merchants and the clerks on the one hand, and the voyageurs on the other. The wealthy fur traders of the Beaver Club, founded in Montreal in 1785, could celebrate their adventures, their hardiness, and their fraternalism amongst themselves. Their celebrations reflected their wealth and high social status in the city.

In addition to physical labour, shared rituals, singing, and storytelling, a shared sense of cultural identity also defined the voyageur. His physical experience of travelling through the land created a sense of geography that was not only physical but also culturally perceived and lived by the voyageur. The travels and experiences of voyageurs shaped their sense of identity and their understanding of the places through which they travelled.

Indigenous women and other women lived in fur-trade society and brought their knowledge, their labour, and their families to the work of the fur trade. Their relationships with European and other traders formed part of the social environment in which the voyageurs worked.

=== Food ===
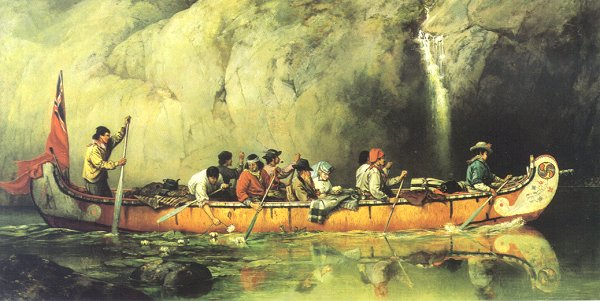
"Quetico Superior Route, passing a Waterfall" by Frances Anne Hopkins

When traveling, the voyageurs did not have time for hunting or gathering. They carried their food with them, often with re-supply along the route. A northern canoe with 6 men and 25 standard 90-pound packs needed about four packs of food per 500 miles. A voyageur's day was long, rising before dawn and travelling before their first meal. Voyageurs typically ate two meals a day. Most of their diet consisted of a few items from a short list of food used for provisioning voyageurs. One was pemmican, consisting primarily of dried meat (pounded into small pieces) mixed with fat. Another was rubaboo or other dishes made from dried peas. Salt pork was more prevalent on the eastern routes.

Montreal-based voyageurs could be supplied by sea or with locally grown crops. Their main food was dried peas or beans, sea biscuit and salt pork. In the Great Lakes area, some maize and wild rice could be obtained locally. By the time trade reached what is now Winnipeg, the pemmican trade developed. Métis would go southwest onto the prairie in Red River carts, slaughter bison, and convert the meat into pemmican, which they carried north to trade at NWC posts. For people on the edge of the prairie, the pemmican trade was as important a source of trade goods as the beaver trade was for First Nations further north. This trade was a major factor in the emergence of a distinct Métis society. Packs of pemmican would be shipped north and stored at the major fur posts Fort Alexander, Cumberland House, Île-à-la-Crosse, Fort Garry, Norway House and Edmonton House.

=== Music ===
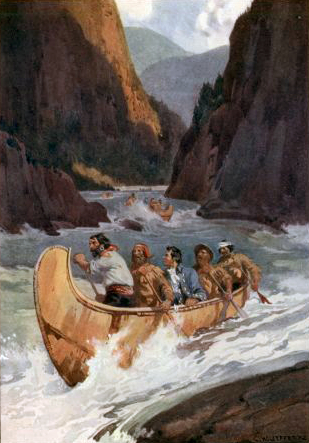
The Descent of the Fraser River, 1808, from a colour drawing by C. W. Jefferys

Music was a part of everyday life for the voyageur. Voyageurs sang songs while paddling and working, as well as during other activities and festivities. Many who travelled with the voyageurs recorded their impressions from hearing the voyageurs sing, and that singing was a significant part of their routine. But few wrote down the words or the music. As a result, records of voyageur songs tend to be skewed towards those that were also popular elsewhere in Canada. Examples of voyageur songs include "À la claire fontaine", "Alouette", "En roulant ma boule", "J'ai trop grand peur des loups", and "Frit à l'huile". Another such song is titled "C'est l'aviron qui nous mène". It goes as follows:

M'en revenant de la joli'Rochelle,
J'ai rencontré trois jolies demoiselles,
C'est l'aviron qui nous mèn', qui nous mont'
C'est l'aviron qui nous monte en haut.

To this day, school children learn this song as part of French Canadian culture. These songs served a dual purpose for the voyageurs. Not only were they entertaining on long voyages, but their rhythm helped synchronize their paddling. One fur trader, Edward Ermatinger, had the forethought to record some of these songs. This is how eleven voyageur's songs came to be known today. Ermatinger travelled for the HBC from 1818 to 1828 as a clerk and learned these songs firsthand. These came to light only in 1943 when the Ermatinger family archives gave them to the Public Archives of Canada so that they may be copied.

=== Lore ===
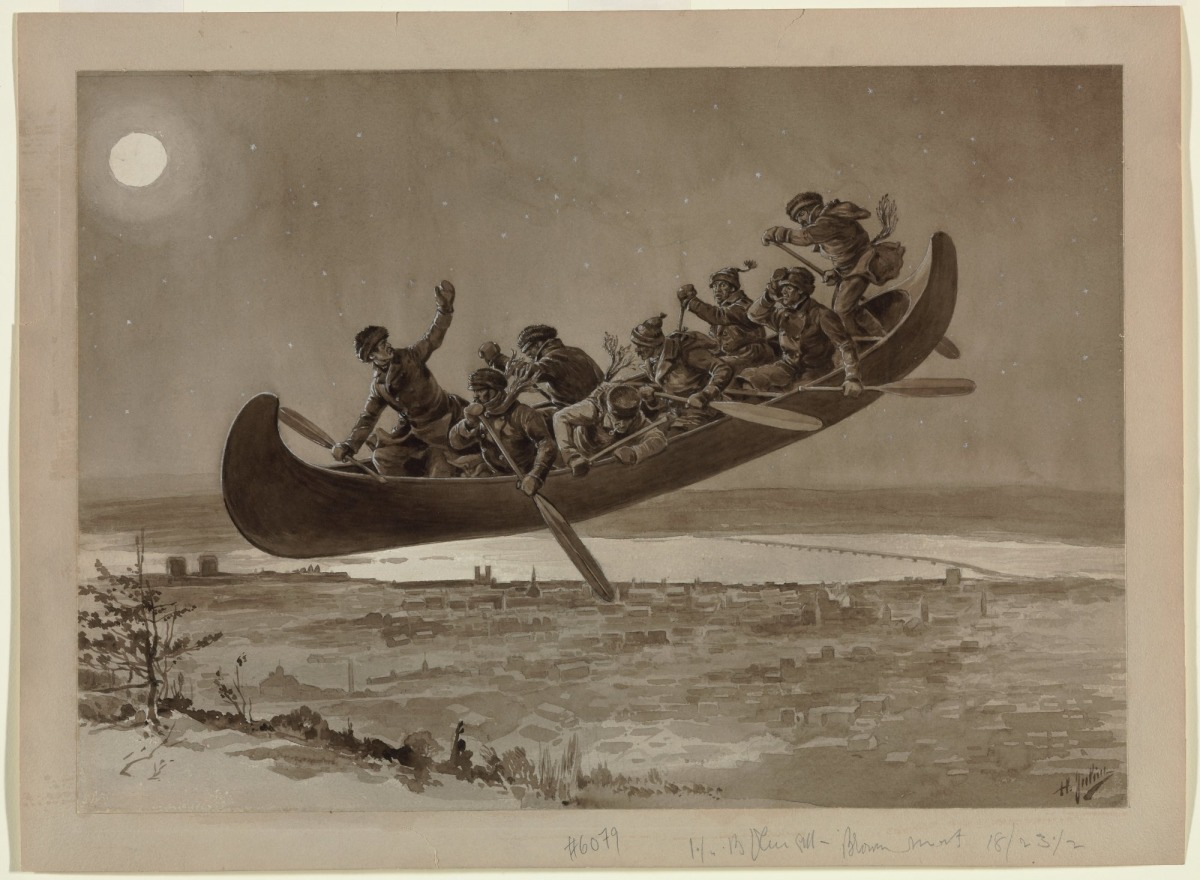
La Chasse-galerie by Henri Julien

The Chasse-galerie, also known as "The Bewitched Canoe" or "The Flying Canoe," is a popular French-Canadian tale of voyageurs who made a deal with the devil in order to visit their sweethearts during the night, who are located a long distance away. It is a variant of the Wild Hunt. Its most famous version was written by Honoré Beaugrand, and was published in The Century Magazine in August 1892.

=== Rendezvous ===
For voyageur-based fur trade, that main route was divided into two (occasionally three) segments, each traversed by a different set of voyageurs. Once or twice a year a larger gathering took place to transfer furs and trade goods among these groups of voyageurs. The largest gatherings occurred at transfer points on the shore of Lake Superior at Grand Portage or Fort William. A rendezvous was also a time for rest and revelry.

=== Marriage ===
Since most voyageurs began their careers in their early 20s, the majority of them were not married while they were working. Those who did marry continued to work while leaving their family behind in Montreal. Few voyageurs are recorded as having married later in their lives in New France. There are a variety of explanations possible for this (including the higher than normal death rates for voyageurs and the opportunity to marry native and Métis women at the rendezvous through local custom weddings). However, it is likely that many voyageurs left for Mississippi or settled in the Canadian West.

== Francophone communities across Canada ==
As French-Canadian voyageurs engaged and brought the fur-trade West, they established multiple settlements in the North-West Territories, Alberta, Saskatchewan, Manitoba, British Columbia, and Yukon. These French/Francophone settlements and communities still exist and thrive today. The Métis Nation (Indigenous/Michif), Franco-Manitobans, Fransaskois, Franco-Albertans, Franco-Columbians, Franco-Ténois and Franco-Yukonais all have origins heavily linked to voyageurs. Franco-Manitobans celebrate their history and heritage with the Festival du Voyageur, and Franco-Albertans celebrate with the Festival du Canoe Volant. Additionally, French and Francophone communities across Canada wear the ceinture fléchée as part of their traditional clothing and cultures. The ceinture fléchée or "arrowed sash" was an important part of the voyageur uniform.

== See also ==
- Canadian canoe routes
- York Factory Express
- Portage La Loche Brigade
- Hudson's Bay Brigade Trail
- Company of One Hundred Associates
