= Trees in the Book of Mormon =

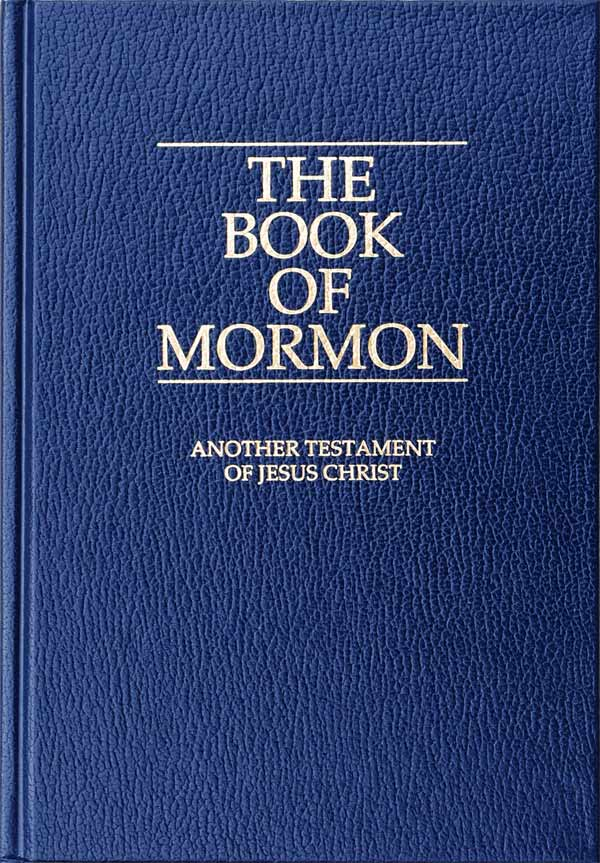
Book of Mormon

Trees are mentioned multiple times in the Book of Mormon, one of the sacred texts of the Christian Latter Day Saint movement. While often employed in metaphors or parables, they are explicitly referenced far less frequently. Trees have also found a place in Latter Day Saint culture, with passages related to them being utilized by critics of Mormonism.

== Background ==
Trees described in the Book of Mormon have been associated with inspirations drawn from various sources. The cosmic tree, often considered the center of the world, is a widespread motif found in the myths and oral traditions of numerous cultures, particularly those of Asia, Australia, and North America. Generally, two main forms of this motif are distinguished, which, using biblical terminology, can be identified as the tree of life and the tree of the knowledge of good and evil.

The tree of life is a symbol rich in meaning, appearing in religious art, architecture, and literature across different historical periods. In the biblical context, it is referenced not only in the Book of Genesis but also in the Book of Proverbs. More detailed descriptions of the tree of life can be found in apocryphal texts. For instance, 1 Enoch 32:5 describes it as fragrant and bearing fruit similar to grapes. Another text, discovered in Egypt in 1945, portrays the tree of life as beautiful, fiery, and bearing fruits resembling white grapes.

The presence of trees has also been noted in several visions or dreams experienced by Joseph Smith Sr. (notably in 1811 and 1813) and Lucy Mack Smith. These experiences may have influenced the depictions of trees that appear in the Book of Mormon.

== Trees as symbolic tools ==
Trees are featured in the Book of Mormon in various contexts, often serving as metaphors, comparisons, allegories, and parables. In the vision seen by the patriarch Lehi and his son Nephi, the tree of life symbolizes the love of God. It also represents the Lamb of God. The fruit of this tree is described as the greatest of all God's gifts. This vision has been identified as central to the Christology of the Book of Mormon, refocusing attention on Jesus Christ as the primary instrument of salvation and calling for reconciliation among all living beings.

Alma reminded the people of Zarahemla about God's invitation to all mortals to partake of the fruit of the tree of life, come unto Christ, repent, and be baptized. This message is detailed in Alma 5:34–36 and Alma 5:62. Alma also taught that the tree of life grows from the seed or word of God planted and nurtured in the heart of an individual, as recorded in Alma 32:37–43.

The Book of Mormon also references the tree of life in the Garden of Eden. In a blessing to his son Jacob, Lehi explained that the tree existed as a necessary counterpart to the tree of forbidden fruit, in accordance with 2 Nephi 2:15. Scholars have noted the absence of direct mention of the tree of the knowledge of good and evil in the Book of Mormon. This omission might stem from the Mormon interpretation of the Fall, which significantly differs from other Christian denominations, as it essentially excludes the concept of original sin.

In another metaphorical use of trees, Jacob speaks of Zenos' allegory of the olive tree. In this allegory, the house of Israel is compared to an olive tree. The allegory discusses events from both the past and the future, particularly regarding the scattering and gathering of the covenant people, illustrated through descriptions of digging, pruning, and nurturing the olive tree. These actions are notably referenced in Jacob 5:11.

The peoples described in the Book of Mormon viewed themselves as a severed branch of the House of Israel, as mentioned in 1 Nephi 19:24 and Alma 26:36. Their prophets, including Joseph, the son of Jacob, taught that in the last days, the Gentiles would help them return to the covenant and become a rightful branch, as seen in various verses in 1 Nephi.

In the Book of Mormon, trees, which bear both good and bad fruit from the human perspective, are used as a metaphor for people and individuals acting both for evil and for good. Those who bear evil fruit are warned that they will eventually be cut down and cast into the fire, as outlined in Alma 5:52.

Other metaphorical and allegorical references to trees in the Book of Mormon can be found in the writings of Isaiah. These were preserved on the brass plates, which were later copied onto Nephi's smaller plates. Isaiah frequently used botanical metaphors to teach about the Messiah and his dealings with the covenant people. He prophesied that Christ would be a branch from the root of Jesse, as preserved in 2 Nephi 21:1. He also compared the pride and stubbornness of the people to the oaks of Bashan and the cedars of Lebanon. He warned that in the Lord's day, such arrogance and pride would be humbled, as seen in 2 Nephi 12:12–13. In another botanical allusion, he compared the restoration of the people to the oak and terebinth, which, though destroyed and consumed by disease, were still capable of regeneration and renewal, as found in 2 Nephi 16:13. He indicated that the restored branch would be both beautiful and fruitful, as stated in 2 Nephi 14:2. Moreover, he compared those who rejoice in Satan's bondage to the fir tree and cedar, which no longer fear being cut down, in 2 Nephi 24:8. He equated the wealth and the treacherous Assyrian people to a forest, where after the Lord's vengeance, so few trees will remain that even a child will be able to count them, as found in 2 Nephi 20:18–19.

Mormon tradition associates the branch from the root of Jesse with Joseph Smith, the founder of the Latter Day Saint movement. John W. Welch did not rule out Smith's descent from Jesse, though he pointed out that within the context of Mormon doctrine, this cannot be definitively established. Other scholars who have studied Mormon theology have held similar or related views.

== Trees in other contexts ==
Actual, living trees are mentioned much less frequently in the Book of Mormon, in stark contrast to the frequent metaphorical use of these plants discussed earlier. Throughout the text, there are only a handful of direct references to trees. Both the Nephites and the Jaredites acquired timber to construct ships that carried them across the ocean while still in the pre-American world, as indicated in 1 Nephi 18:1–2 and Ether 2:17. Alma hid among a thicket of trees near the Waters of Mormon, as described in Mosiah 18:5. Zemnarihah, one of the Gadianton robbers, was hanged on a tree, as recorded in 3 Nephi 4:28. Additionally, Helaman 3:9–10 notes a scarcity of timber in the lands described within the internal geography of the Book of Mormon.

== Trees in criticism of the Book of Mormon ==
The presence of trees in the Book of Mormon has been a point of critique by opponents of Mormonism. A proposal linking a stela discovered in Mexico in the 1940s to the vision of the tree of life has been criticized by figures such as Harold W. Hougey, Jerald Tanner, Sandra Tanner, and Latayne Scott.

Jerald and Sandra Tanner argued that the olive tree allegory of Zenos is both a plagiarism and an anachronism. They claimed it was directly taken from the Bible, particularly from Romans 11:16–24 and various statements of Christ recorded in the Gospels. According to them, the allegory originates from the 1st century CE rather than the pre-7th century BCE period suggested by the Book of Mormon.

== Presence in Mormon culture ==
The trees described in the Book of Mormon have found significant resonance in the culture of Latter Day Saints. Passages referencing symbolic trees rank among the most well-known and frequently quoted sections of this sacred text. The tree of life remains a prominent symbol within the faith, often regarded as a cornerstone of the Book of Mormon's teachings. A stained-glass depiction of the tree of life adorns the Washington D.C. Mormon Temple.

The allegory of Zenos has also inspired a substantial body of literature. Elder Joseph Fielding Smith described it as one of the greatest parables in recorded history. Similarly, Joseph Fielding McConkie classified it as a classic allegory rooted in scripture.

The discovery of the so-called Izapa Stela 5 in Chiapas, Mexico, during the 1940s captured the interest of Latter Day Saints. M. Wells Jakeman, an archaeology professor at Brigham Young University in the 1950s, brought attention to the artifact. This pre-Columbian stela, dating between 100 BCE and 100 CE, portrays a scene reminiscent of Lehi and Nephi's vision of the tree of life. However, not all Latter Day Saints agree with linking this stela to the Book of Mormon. In a 1969 article in Dialogue: A Journal of Mormon Thought, Dee F. Green criticized the connection, labeling it pseudoscience. Green argued that no reliable evidence exists to confirm that the stela's artist depicted Lehi's vision or drew inspiration from it. Hugh Nibley, another prominent LDS scholar, also expressed skepticism about associating Izapa Stela 5 with the Book of Mormon.

Mormon apologetics have drawn attention to similar motifs in other Mesoamerican contexts, such as the Temple of the Inscriptions in Palenque. Some proponents also point to an image from the Dresden Codex, where a sacrificed man sprouts a tree from his heart, linking it to passages in Alma 32. However, Mormon sources often refrain from definitive claims about these connections, reflecting the church's cautious stance on the geographical setting of Book of Mormon events.

Additionally, Mormon apologetics have suggested that passages about the tree of life and the forbidden fruit in the Book of Mormon bear thematic similarities to teachings in the Popol Vuh, the sacred book of the Kʼicheʼ people.

== Bibliography ==
- Gore, David Charles (2021). ""All the Precious Trees of the Earth": Trees in Restoration Scripture". Religions. 12 (12). University of Minnesota Duluth: 1035. doi:10.3390/rel12121035. ISSN 2077-1444.
- Welch, John W. (2020). John W. Welch Notes - Come Follow Me. Springville, Utah: Book of Mormon Central.
- Brewer, Stewart W. (1999). "The History of an Idea: The Scene on Stela 5 from Izapa, Mexico, as a Representation of Lehi's Vision of the Tree of Life". Journal of Book of Mormon Studies. 8 (1). Brigham Young University. ISSN 2168-3158.
- Welch, John W.; Parry, Donald W. (2011). The Tree of Life: From Eden to Eternity. Salt Lake City: Deseret Book. ISBN 978-1-60908-674-9.
- Largey, Dennis L., ed. (2003). The Book of Mormon Reference Companion. Salt Lake City: Deseret Book. ISBN 978-1-60908-763-0.
- Księga Mormona Przewodnik do samodzielnego studiowania dla uczniów seminarium [The Book of Mormon: A Self-Study Guide for Seminary Students] (in Polish). Salt Lake City: Kościół Jezusa Chrystusa Świętych w Dniach Ostatnich. 2012.
- McConkie, Joseph; Parry, Donald W. (1990). "Scriptural Symbols". A Guide to Scriptural Symbols. Salt Lake City: Bookcraft. ISBN 0-88494-726-2.
- Ludlow, Daniel H., ed. (1992). Encyclopedia of Mormonism. New York: Macmillan Publishing. ISBN 978-0-02-904040-9.
