= Lob trees =

Conspicuous trees with chopped off branches

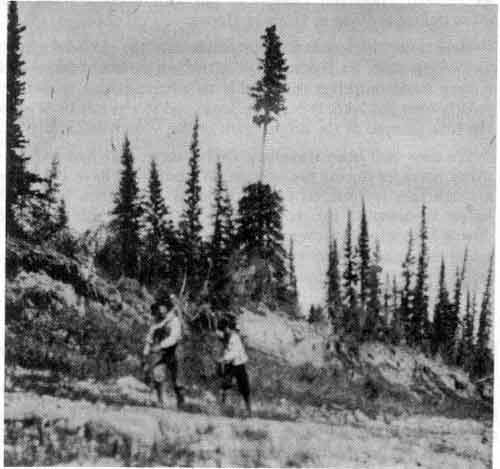
Two First Nations men with a lob tree in the background

Lob trees were prominent trees used as guides or landmarks along voyageur canoe routes. Branches were lopped (or lobbed) off the trees just below the top to make them more conspicuous. They were located at important places along canoe routes to indicate a portage, trail, or direction to a fur trading post. Often the tree was named in recognition of a famous explorer, a bourgeois (trading company official), or a voyageur who had performed bravely. Research has shown that this was adopted from earlier First Nations tribes who practised this form of marking.

Most of the indigenous lob trees were red pine, white pine and periodically white spruce. Though most of them have died, there are still a few that can be found in the Quetico Provincial Park. Voyageurs National Park also still has some as of 08/2019.

== See also ==
- North American fur trade
