= United States Merchant Marine =

U.S. civilian mariners

- Allegiance: United States
- Size: 465 ships (>1,000 GRT)

Insignia
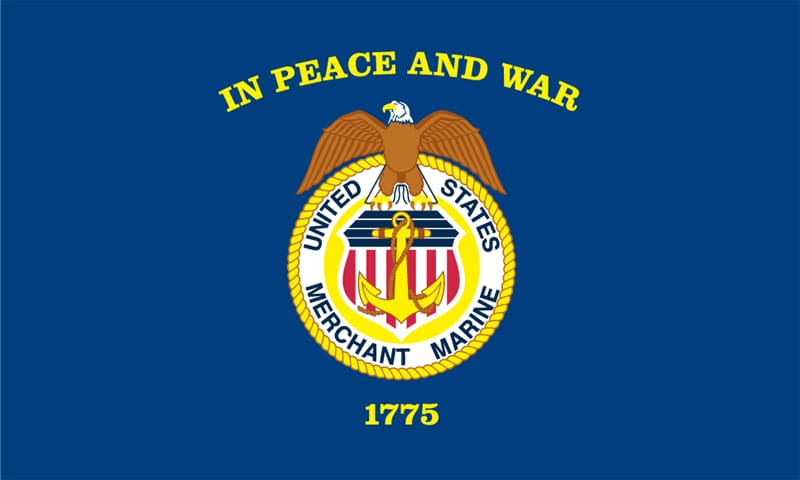
- Flag

The United States Merchant Marine refers collectively to U.S.-flagged commercial vessels, both privately and federally owned, and the civilian mariners who crew them. Both the civilian mariners and the merchant vessels are managed by a combination of the government and private sectors, and engage in commerce or transportation of goods and services in and out of the navigable waters of the United States.

The Merchant Marine primarily transports domestic and international cargo and passengers during peacetime, and operates and maintains deep-sea merchant ships, tugboats, towboats, ferries, dredges, excursion vessels, charter boats and other waterborne craft on the oceans, the Great Lakes, rivers, canals, harbors, and other waterways. In times of war, the Merchant Marine can be an auxiliary to the United States Navy, and can be called upon to deliver personnel and materiel for the military.

In the 19th and 20th centuries, laws fundamentally changed American merchant shipping. These laws put an end to common practices such as flogging and shanghaiing, and increased shipboard safety and living standards. The United States Merchant Marine is also governed by more than 25 international conventions to promote safety and prevent pollution, as of February 2017.

In 2022, the United States merchant fleet had 178 privately owned, oceangoing, self-propelled vessels of 1,000 gross register tons and above. Nearly 800 American-owned ships are flagged in other nations.

The federal government maintains fleets of merchant ships managed by the United States Maritime Administration. In 2014, they employed approximately 6.5% of all American water transportation workers. Merchant Marine officers may also be commissioned as military officers by the Department of Defense. This is commonly achieved by commissioning unlimited tonnage Merchant Marine officers as strategic sealift officers in the United States Navy Reserve.

== Shipboard operations ==
Captains, mates (officers), and pilots supervise ship operations on domestic waterways and the high seas. A captain (master) is in overall command of a vessel, and supervises the work of other officers and crew. A captain has the authority to take the conn from a mate or pilot at any time he or she feels the need. On smaller vessels the captain may be a regular watch-stander, similar to a mate, directly controlling the vessel's position. Captains and department heads ensure that proper procedures and safety practices are followed, ensure that machinery is in good working order, and oversee the loading and discharging of cargo and passengers. Captains directly communicate with the company or command (MSC), and are overall responsible for cargo, various logs, ship's documents, credentials, efforts at controlling pollution and passengers carried.

Mates direct a ship's routine operation for the captain during work shifts, which are called watches. Mates stand watch for specified periods, usually in three duty sections, with four hours on watch and eight hours off. When on a navigational watch, mates direct a bridge team by conning, directing courses through the helmsman and speed through the lee helmsman (or directly in open ocean). When more than one mate is necessary aboard a ship, they typically are designated chief mate or first mate, second mate and third mate.

In addition to watch standers, mates directly supervise the ship's crew, and are assigned other tasks. The chief mate is usually in charge of cargo, stability and the deck crew, the second mate in charge of navigation plans and updates and the third mate as the safety officer. They also monitor and direct deck crew operations, such as directing line handlers during moorings, and anchorings, monitor cargo operations and supervise crew members engaged in maintenance and the vessel's upkeep.

Harbor pilots guide ships in and out of confined waterways, such as harbors, where a familiarity with local conditions is of prime importance. Harbor pilots are generally independent contractors who accompany vessels while they enter or leave port, and may pilot many ships in a single day.

Engine officers, or engineers, operate, maintain, and repair engines, boilers, generators, pumps, and other machinery. Merchant marine vessels usually have four engine officers: a chief engineer and a first, second, and third assistant engineer. On many ships, Assistant Engineers stand periodic watches, overseeing the safe operation of engines and other machinery. However, most modern ships sailing today utilize unmanned machinery space (UMS) automation technology, and Assistant Engineers are dayworkers. At night and during meals and breaks, the engine room is unmanned and machinery alarms are answered by the Duty Engineer.

Marine oilers and more experienced qualified members of the engine department, or QMEDs, maintain the vessel in proper running order in the engine spaces below decks, under the direction of the ship's engine officers. These workers lubricate gears, shafts, bearings, and other moving parts of engines and motors; read pressure and temperature gauges, record data and sometimes assist with repairs and adjust machinery. Wipers are the entry-level workers in the engine room, holding a position similar to that of ordinary seamen of the deck crew. They clean and paint the engine room and its equipment and assist the others in maintenance and repair work. With more experience, they become oilers and firemen.

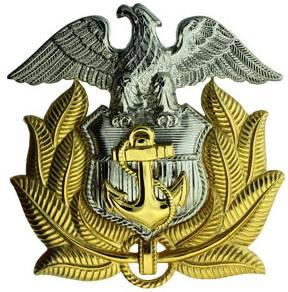
The United States Merchant Marine officer's crest

Able seamen and ordinary seamen operate the vessel and its deck equipment under officer supervision and keep their assigned areas in good order. They watch for other vessels and obstructions in the ship's path, as well as for navigational aids such as buoys and lighthouses. They also steer the ship, measure water depth in shallow water, and maintain and operate deck equipment such as lifeboats, anchors, and cargo-handling gear.

On tankers, mariners designated as pumpmen hook up hoses, operate pumps, and clean tanks. When arriving at or leaving a dock, they handle the mooring lines. Seamen also perform routine maintenance chores, such as repairing lines, chipping rust, and painting and cleaning decks. On larger vessels, a boatswain—or head seaman—will supervise the work.

As of 2011, a typical deep-sea merchant ship has a captain, three mates, a chief engineer and three assistant engineers, plus six or more unlicensed seamen, such as able seamen, oilers, QMEDs, and cooks or food handlers known as stewards. Other unlicensed positions on a large ship may include electricians and machinery mechanics.

== History ==
The North American shipping industry developed as colonies grew and trade with Europe increased. As early as the 16th century, Europeans were shipping horses, cattle and hogs to the Americas.

Spanish colonies began to form as early as 1565 in places like St. Augustine, Florida, and later in Santa Fe, New Mexico; San Antonio, Tucson, San Diego, Los Angeles and San Francisco. English colonies like Jamestown began to form as early as 1607. The connection between the American colonies and Europe, with shipping as its only conduit, would continue to grow unhindered for almost two hundred years.

=== Revolutionary War ===
The first wartime role of an identifiable United States Merchant Marine took place on June 12, 1775, at the Battle of Machias. A group of Machias residents, hearing the news of the Battles of Lexington and Concord, captured the British supply sloop HMS Margaretta. Word of the capture reached Boston, where the Continental Congress and the various colonies issued letters of marque to American privateers. The privateers interrupted British supply chains along the eastern seaboard of the United States and across the Atlantic Ocean. These actions by the privateers predate both the United States Coast Guard and the United States Navy, which were formed in 1790 and 1797, respectively.

=== Early Republic ===
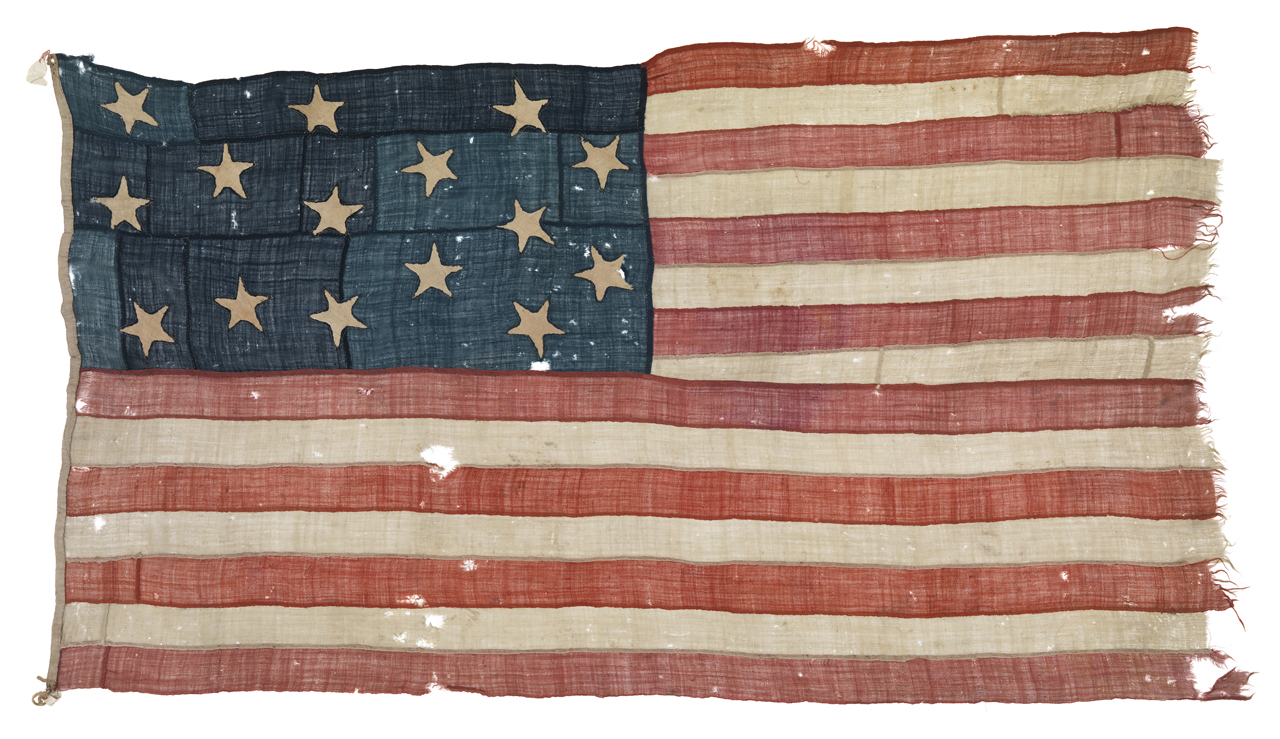
Civil ensign of an American merchant brig captured by HMS Borer during the War of 1812

During the Napoleonic Wars the American carriers, particularly in New England, were the neutral parties that benefited economically during these years.

=== 19th and 20th centuries ===
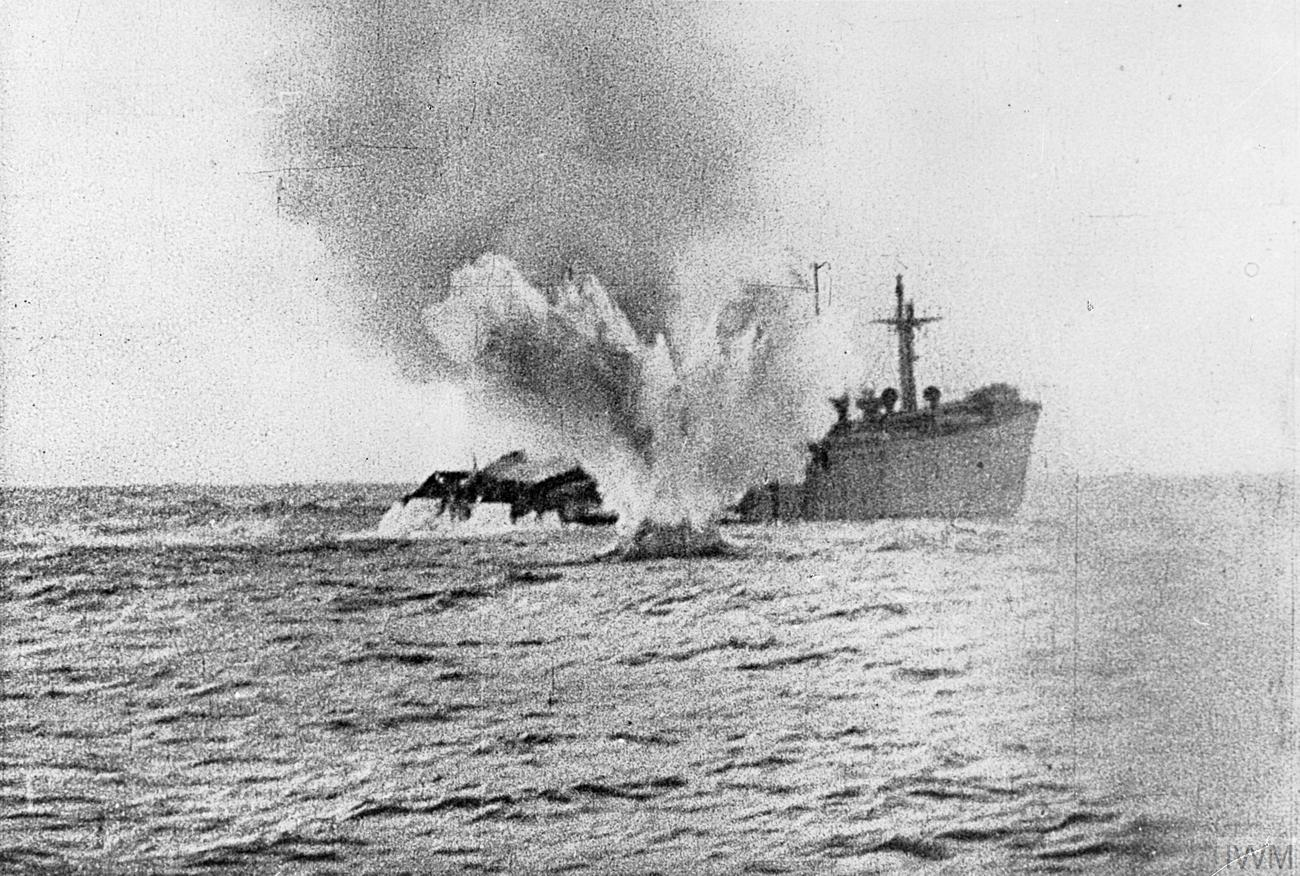
A torpedoed merchant ship in the Atlantic Ocean during WWII.

The merchant marine was active in subsequent wars, from the Confederate commerce raiders of the American Civil War, to the assaults on Allied commerce in the First and in the Second World Wars. 3.1 million tons of merchant ships were lost in World War II. Mariners died at a rate of 1 in 26, which was the highest death rate of any service. All told, 733 American cargo ships were lost and 8,651 of the 215,000 who served perished in troubled waters and off enemy shores.

During World War II, ships with deck guns had United States Navy Armed Guard to man the guns. Some Armed Guard personnel also served as Radiomen and Signalmen. The Navy gun crews were assisted by ship's crew, though the merchant mariner's training in gunnery and combat role was ignored for years. Specific instructions as to merchant crew manning of guns and training they should receive was issued by the War Shipping Administration which operated all U.S. merchant ships either directly or through agents during the war. By the wars end, 144,857 men had served in the Navy Armed Guard, on 6,200 ships.

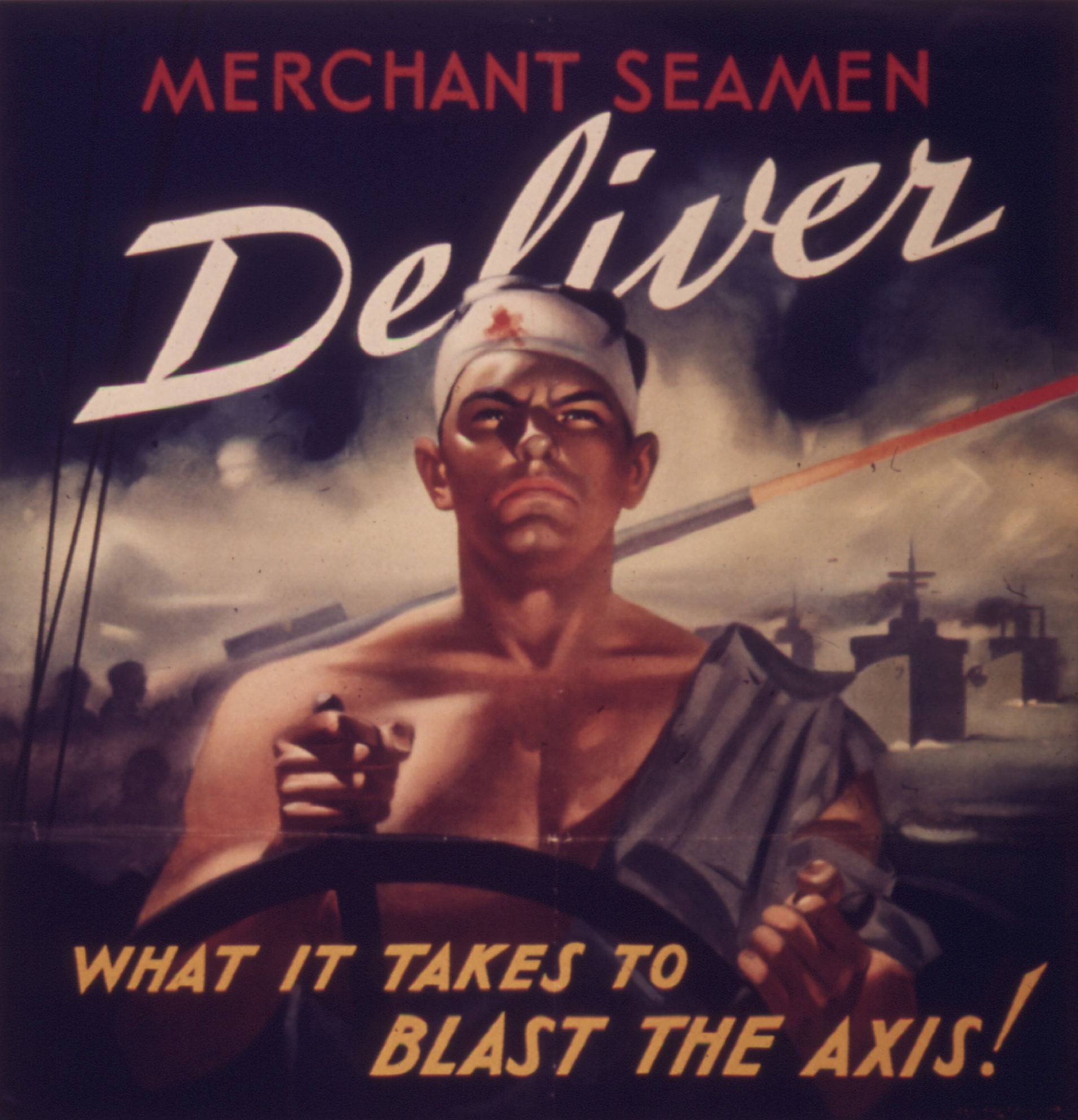
'Merchant seamen deliver what it takes to blast the Axis' – poster

Merchant shipping played its role in the wars in Vietnam and Korea. During the Korean War, under the operational control in theater of the Military Sea Transportation Service (MSTS), the number of chartered ships grew from 6 to 255. In September 1950, when the U.S. Marine Corps went ashore at Incheon, 13 Navy cargo ships, 26 chartered American, and 34 Japanese-manned merchant ships of the MSTS participated.

During the Vietnam War, at least 172 National Defense Reserve Fleet (NDRF) ships were activated, and together with other US-flagged merchant vessels crewed by civilian seamen, carried 95% of the supplies used by the American armed forces. Many of these ships sailed into combat zones under fire. The SS Mayaguez incident involved the capture of mariners from the American merchant ship SS Mayaguez.

During the first Gulf War, the merchant ships of the Military Sealift Command (MSC) delivered more than 12 million metric tons of vehicles, helicopters, ammunition, fuel and other supplies and equipment. At one point during the war, more than 230 government-owned and chartered ships were involved in the sealift.

As of January 2017, U.S. Government-owned merchant vessels from the National Defense Reserve Fleet have supported emergency shipping requirements in 10 wars and crises. During the Korean War, 540 vessels were activated to support military forces. A worldwide tonnage shortfall from 1951 to 1953 required over 600 ship activations to lift coal to Northern Europe and grain to India. The Department of Agriculture required 698 activated ships to store grain from 1955 to 1964. After the Suez Canal Crisis in 1956, the NDRF activated 223 cargo ships and 29 tankers. During the Berlin Wall Crisis of 1961, 18 NDRF vessels were activated, remaining in service until 1970. The Vietnam War required the activation of 172 vessels.

Since 1976, the Ready Reserve Fleet (RRF) has taken the brunt of the work previously handled by the National Defense Reserve Fleet. The RRF made a major contribution to the success of Operation Desert Shield/Operation Desert Storm from August 1990 through June 1992, when 79 vessels helped meet military sealift requirements by carrying 25% of the unit equipment and 45% of the ammunition needed.

Two RRF tankers, two Roll-on/Roll-off (RO/RO) ships and a troop transport ship were employed in Somalia for Operation Restore Hope in 1993 and 1994. During the Haitian crisis in 1994, 15 ships were activated for Operation Uphold Democracy operations. In 1995 and 1996, four RO/RO ships were used to deliver military cargo as part of US and UK support to NATO peace-keeping missions.

Four RRF ships were activated to provide humanitarian assistance for Central America following Hurricane Mitch in 1998.

=== WWII veteran status ===
During World War II, nearly 250,000 civilian merchant mariners served as part of the U.S. military, transporting supplies and personnel. Between 1939 and 1945, 9,521 merchant mariners died, a per capita casualty rate greater than those of each U.S. Armed Forces branch. The GI Bill Improvement Act Of 1977 P.L. 95-202, granted veteran status to Women Airforce Service Pilots and "any person in any other similarly situated group" with jurisdiction granted to the Secretary of Defense, and delegated to the Secretary of the Air Force.

Merchant mariners who served in World War II were denied such veterans recognition until 1987 when a federal court ordered it. The Court held that the Secretary of the Air Force wrongfully denied active military service recognition to American merchant mariners who participated in World War II.

=== 21st century ===
In 2003, 40 RRF ships were used in support of Operation Enduring Freedom and Operation Iraqi Freedom. This RRF contribution included sealifting into the combat theater equipment and supplies including combat support equipment for the Army, Navy Combat Logistics Force, and USMC Aviation Support equipment. By the beginning of May 2005, RRF cumulative support included 85 ship activations that logged almost 12,000 ship operating days, moving almost 25% of the equipment needed to support operations in Iraq.

The Military Sealift Command was also involved in the Iraq War, delivering 61,000,000 square feet (5,700,000 m^{2}) of cargo and 1,100,000,000 US gallons (4,200,000 m^{3}) of fuel by the end of that year. Merchant mariners were recognized for their contributions in Iraq. For example, in late 2003, VADM David L. Brewer III, Military Sealift Command commander, awarded the crew of MV Capt. Steven L. Bennett the Merchant Marine Expeditionary Medal.

The RRF was called upon to provide humanitarian assistance to gulf coast areas following Hurricane Katrina and Hurricane Rita landfalls in September 2005. The Federal Emergency Management Agency requested a total of eight vessels to support relief efforts. Messing and berthing was provided for refinery workers, oil spill response teams and longshoremen. One vessel provided electrical power.

As of 2007, three RRF ships supported the U.S. Army's Afloat Prepositioning Force (APF) with two specialized tankers and one dry cargo vessel capable of underway replenishment for the Navy's Combat Logistics Force.

In October 2015, a Military Sealift Command oiler and a United States civilian tanker refueled at sea during an exercise. This is not normally done as commercial fleet vessels are not normally geared for this type of exercise. This was done to increase operational readiness of MSC's naval auxiliary assets and prove flexibility of operation.

In Fall 2021, news broke out that several midshipmen reported having been sexually assaulted either at the Academy or during Sea Year. The news resulted in a suspension of Sea Year, multiple investigations and lawsuits, and another promise by the U.S. Government to keep women safer while under their jurisdiction.

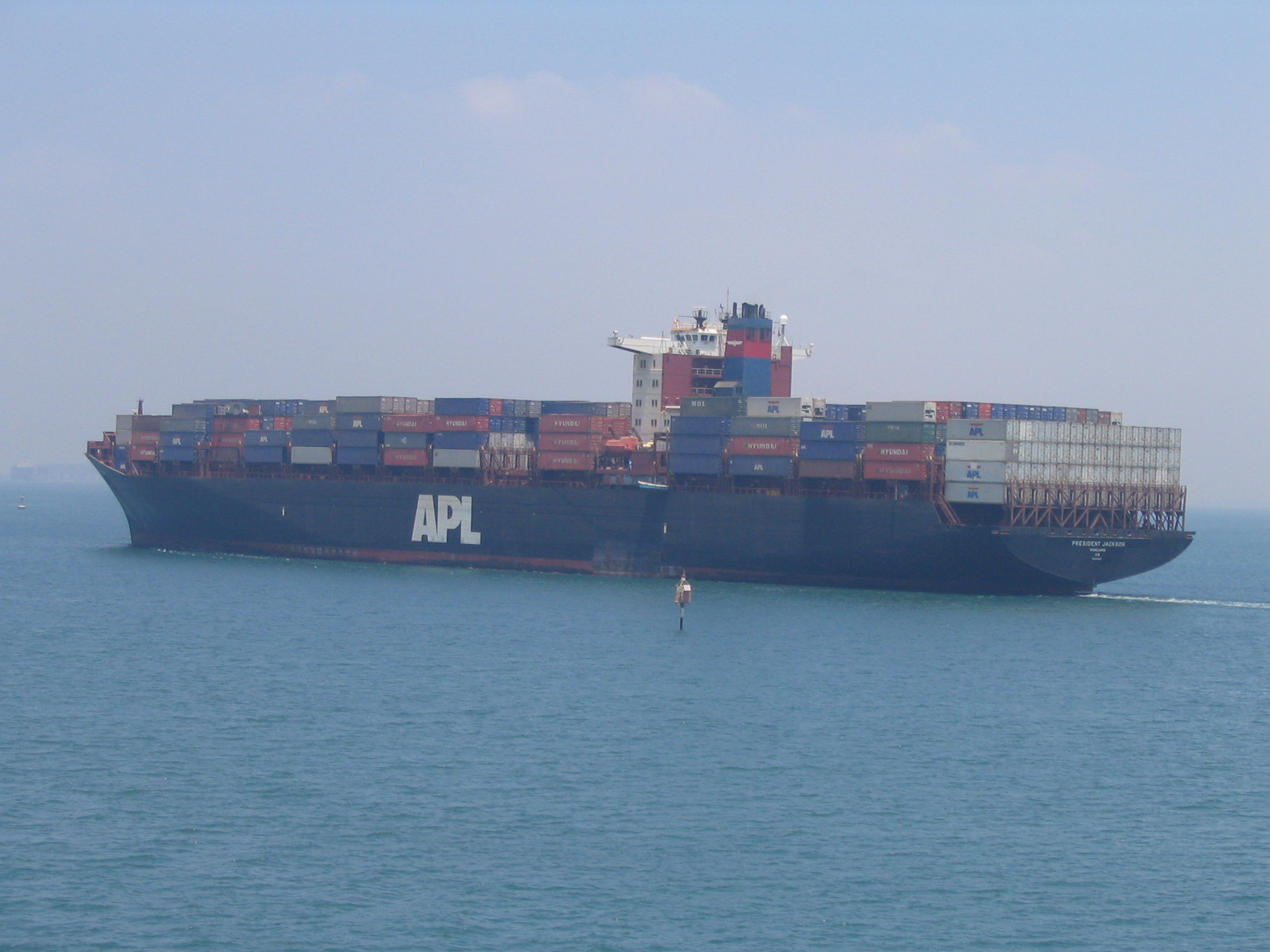
A U.S. Flag Ship

== Fleets ==
=== Commercial fleet ===
In December 2016, the United States merchant fleet had 175 privately owned, oceangoing, self-propelled vessels of 1,000 gross register tons and above that carry cargo from port to port. One hundred fourteen (114) were dry cargo ships, and 61 were tankers. Ninety seven (97) were Jones Act eligible, and 78 were non-Jones Act eligible. MARAD deemed 152 of the 175 vessels "militarily useful".

In 2005, there were also 77 passenger ships. Of those American-flagged ships, 51 were foreign owned. Seven hundred ninety-four (794) American-owned ships are flagged in other nations.

2005 statistics from the United States Maritime Administration focused on the larger segment of the fleet: ships of 10,000 tonnes deadweight (DWT) and over. Two hundred forty-five (245) privately owned American-flagged ships are of this size, and 153 of those meet the Jones Act criteria.

The World War II era was the peak for the U.S. fleet. During the post-war year of 1950, for example, U.S. carriers represented about 43 percent of the world's shipping trade. By 1995, the American market share had plunged to 4 percent, according to a 1997 report by the U.S. Congressional Budget Office (CBO). The report states, "the number of U.S.-flag vessels has dropped precipitously — from more than 2,000 in the 1940s and 850 in 1970 to about 320 in 1996."

A diminishing U.S. fleet contrasted with the burgeoning of international sea trade. For example, worldwide demand for natural gas led to the growth of the global liquefied natural gas (LNG) tanker fleet, which reached 370 vessels in 2007. In 2007, the United States Maritime Administration (MARAD) set uniform LNG training standards at U.S. maritime training facilities. While short-term imports are declining, longer term projections signal an eightfold increase in U.S. imported LNG by 2025, the worldwide LNG fleet does not include a single U.S. flagged vessel. Only five U.S. deepwater LNG ports were operational in 2007, although permits have been issued for four additional ports, according to MARAD.

The U.S. pool of qualified mariners declined with the fleet. In 2004, MARAD described the gap between sealift crewing needs and available unlicensed personnel as "reaching critical proportions, and the long term outlook for sufficient personnel is also of serious concern".

Future seagoing jobs for U.S. mariners may be on other than U.S.-flagged ships. American-trained mariners are being sought after by international companies to operate foreign-flagged vessels, according to Julie A. Nelson, deputy maritime administrator of the U.S. Maritime Administration. For example, Shell International and Shipping Company Ltd. began recruiting U.S. seafarers to crew its growing fleet of tankers in 2008. In 2007, Overseas Shipholding Group and the Maritime Administration agreed to allow American maritime academy cadets to train aboard OSG's international flag vessels.

=== Federal fleet ===
The Military Sealift Command (MSC), an arm of the Navy, serves the entire Department of Defense as the ocean carrier of materiel during peacetime and war. MSC transports equipment, fuel, ammunition, and other goods essential to United States armed forces worldwide. Up to 95% of all supplies needed to sustain the U.S. military can be moved by Military Sealift Command. As of February 2017, MSC operated approximately 120 ships with 100 more in reserve. More than 5,500 civil service or contract merchant mariners staff the ships.

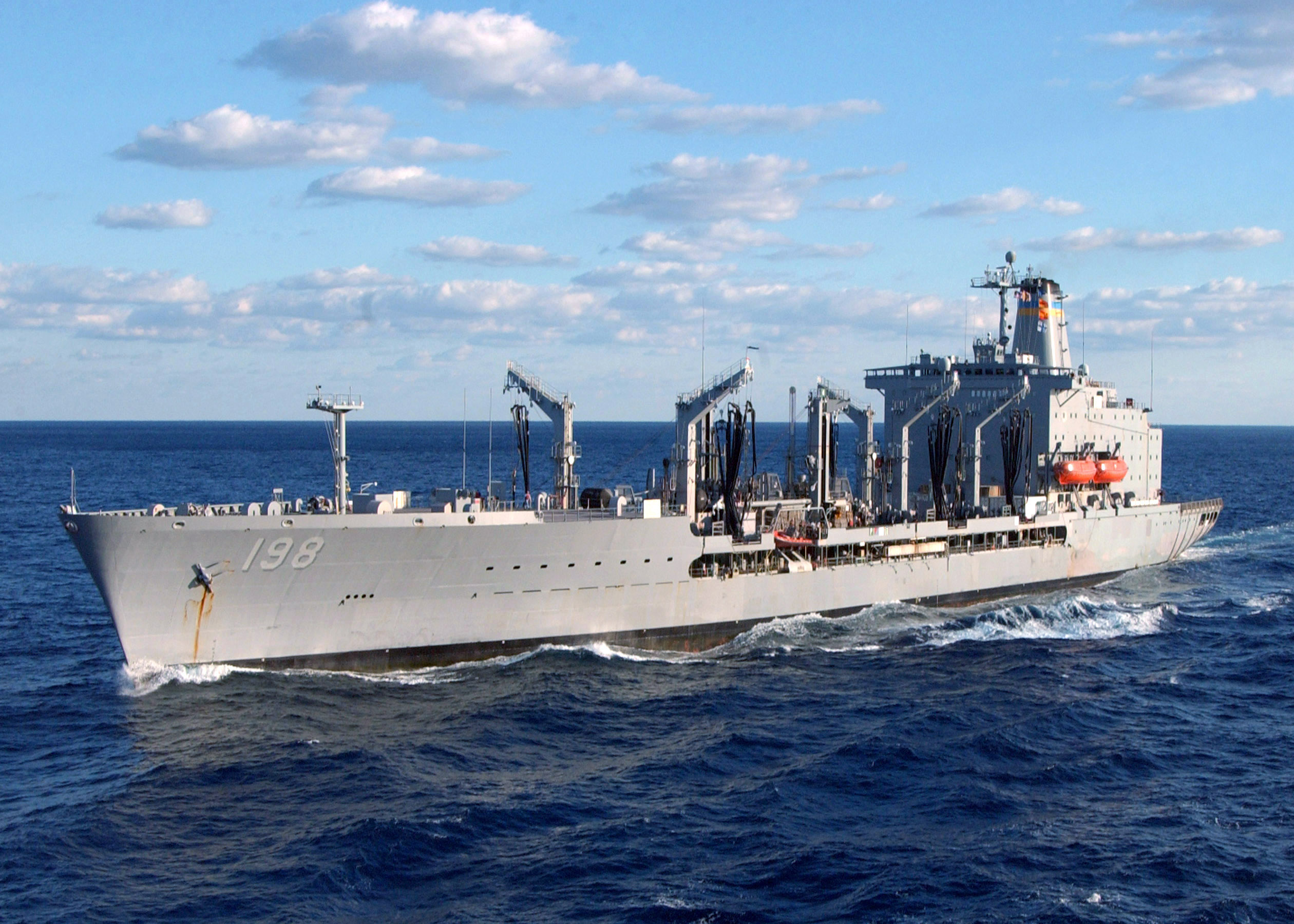
USNS Big Horn, a Henry J. Kaiser-class replenishment oiler, crewed by United States Merchant Mariners.

MSC tankers and freighters have a long history of also serving as supply vessels in support of civilian research in the Arctic and Antarctic, including: McMurdo Station, Antarctica; and Greenland in the Arctic.

The National Defense Reserve Fleet (NDRF) acts as a reserve of cargo ships for national emergencies and defense. As of 31 January 2017, the NDRF fleet numbered 99 ships, down from 2,277 ships at its peak in 1950. NDRF vessels are now staged at the James River (off Ft. Eustis, VA); Beaumont, TX; and Suisun Bay (off Benicia, CA) anchorages, and other designated locations.

A Ready Reserve Force component of the NDRF was established in 1976 to provide rapid global deployment of military equipment and forces. As of January 2017, the RRF consists of 46 vessels, down from a peak of 102 vessels in 1994. Two RRF ships are homeported at the NDRF anchorage in Beaumont, TX, while the remainder are assigned to various other homeports.

In 2014, the federal government reported directly employing approximately 5,100 seafarers, out of an industry total of over 78,000 water transportation workers in Occupation Code 53–5000, which represented about 6.5% of all water transportation workers, many of whom worked on Military Sealift Command supply ships. By 2016, MSC reported employing more than 5,500 federal civilian mariners.

== Training ==
Training and licensing are managed by the United States Coast Guard, guided by the United States Code of Federal Regulations Title 46, Chapter I, Subchapter B. Training requirements are also molded by the International Convention on Standards of Training, Certification, and Watchkeeping for Seafarers (or STCW), which prescribes minimum standards that must be met.

=== Officers / Licensed (Unlimited Tonnage) ===
Unlimited tonnage deck officers (referred to as mates) and engine officers are trained at maritime academies, or by accumulating sea-time as a rating on an unlimited tonnage ship along with passing certain training courses. Officers hold senior leadership positions aboard vessels, and must train over several years to meet the minimum standards. At the culmination of training, potential officers must pass an extensive examination administered by the U.S. Coast Guard that spans five days.

Upon meeting all requirements and passing the final license examination, new officers are credentialed as third mates or third assistant engineers. To advance in grade, such as to 2nd Mate or 2nd Engineer, sea time in the prior grade and additional endorsements and testing are required. The term "unlimited" indicates that there are no limits that the officer has in relation to the size and power of the vessel, or the geographic location of operation.

==== United States Merchant Marine Academy ====
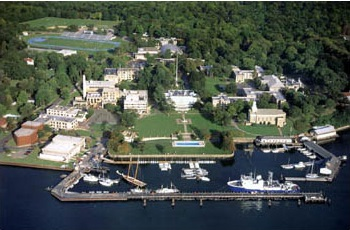
The United States Merchant Marine Academy.

The U.S. Merchant Marine Academy (also known as USMMA or Kings Point) is one of the five United States service academies (the others are the United States Military Academy, Naval Academy, Coast Guard Academy, and Air Force Academy), and one of eleven United States maritime academies. It is charged with training officers for the United States Merchant Marine, branches of the military, and the transportation industry.

The academy operates on an $85 million annual budget funded by the U.S. Department of Transportation and is administered by the U.S. Maritime Administration (MARAD).

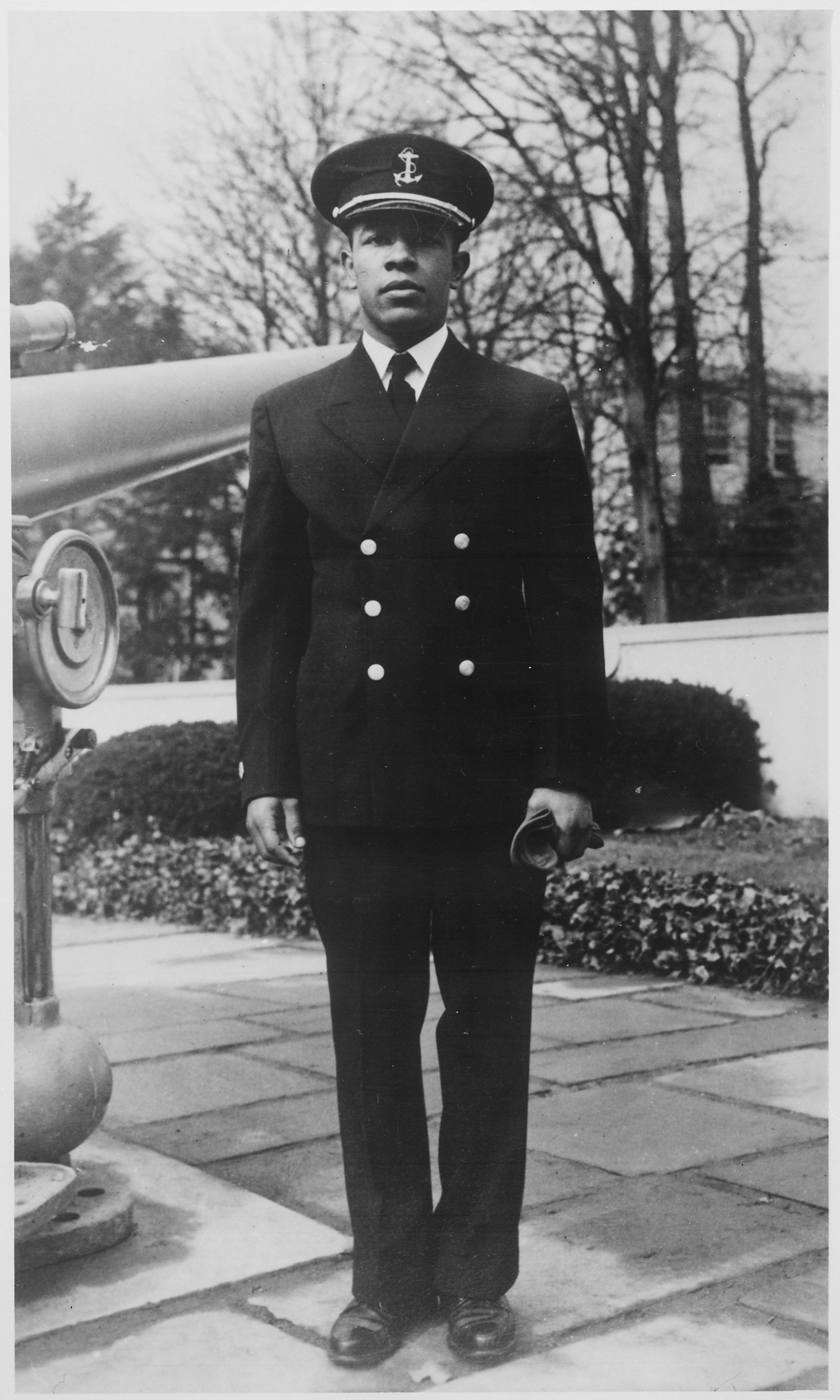
Joseph Banks Williams was the first African American to graduate from the academy, in 1944.

Joseph Banks Williams entered the academy in 1942 and was the first African-American to graduate in 1944. Admission requirements were further changed in 1974, when the USMMA became the first Federal service academy to enroll female students, two years before the other Federal service academies.

Freshmen, known as "plebes," upon reporting in June or July of each year as the incoming class, begin a three-week indoctrination period, also known as "Indoc". Indoc is functionally run by upperclass midshipmen, but is overseen by officers of the United States Maritime Service who are part of the Commandant of Midshipman's staff. This high stress period involves physical training, marching, and an intensive introduction to regimental life at the academy. After the indoctrination period is completed, the academic year begins.

U.S. citizen candidates for admission must sign a service obligation contract as a condition of admittance to the USMMA; U.S. candidates who completed Indoc will execute the Oath of Office as a Midshipman in the Navy Reserve the day prior to Acceptance Day. Plebes officially become part of the USMMA Regiment of Midshipmen on Acceptance Day, which is now standardized at 2 weeks after Indoc ends. Until they are "recognized" later in the academic year, plebes must continue adhere to stringent rules affecting most aspects of their daily life. After earning it, the plebes are recognized, henceforth accorded privilege of the title Midshipman, which gives them more privileges, known as "rates".

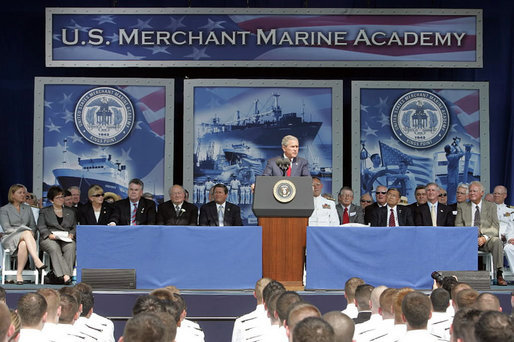
George W. Bush delivering the commencement address at the United States Merchant Marine Academy.

Academy students focus on one of two different ship transport areas of education: marine transportation or marine engineering. Transportation students learn about ship navigation, cargo handling, navigation rules, and maritime law. Engineering students learn about the function of the ship's engines and its supporting systems. There are currently five different academic majors conferring a Bachelor of Science degree in the major field of study available to midshipmen:

- Two of them are referred to as "Deck Majors":
  1. Marine Transportation
  2. Maritime Logistics and Security

"Deck Majors" sit for and, upon successfully completing the examination, are issued a Third Mate (Deck Officer) License of Steam or Motor Vessels, Unlimited Tonnage, Upon Oceans.

- The other three available curricula are referred to as "Engine Majors":
  1. Marine Engineering
  2. Marine Engineering Systems
  3. Marine Engineering and Shipyard Management

"Engine Majors" sit for and, upon successfully completing the examination, are issued Third Assistant Engineer (3 A/E – Engineering Officer) Licenses Steam and Motor Vessels, Any Horsepower. Marine Engineering Systems and Marine Engineering Systems & Shipyard Management graduates are also qualified to sit for the Engineer In Training (EIT) examination administered by the National Council of Examiners for Engineering and Surveying (NCEES).

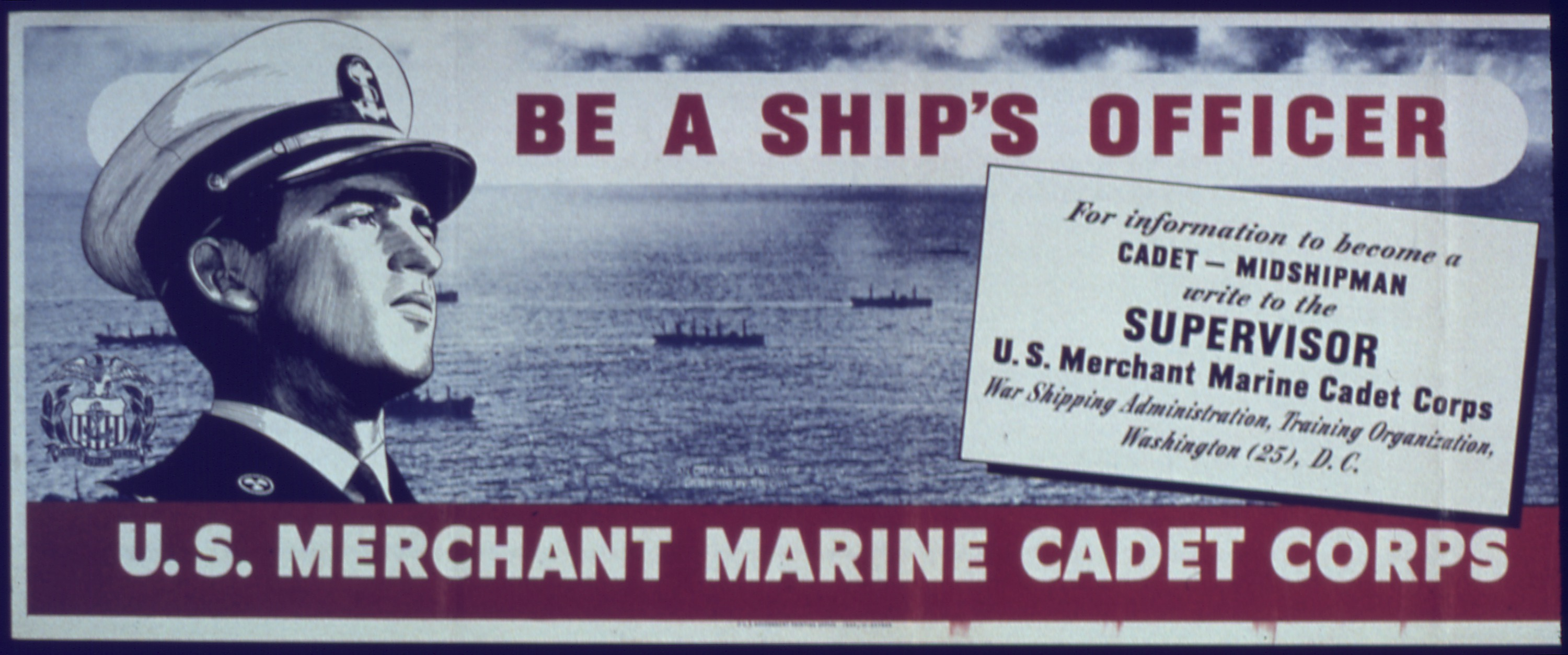
WWII advertising poster

For part of sophomore and junior year, known at the academy as third class and second class years, midshipmen work as cadets on American-flagged unlimited tonnage merchant ships. Midshipmen are typically paired two to a ship, one engine cadet and one deck cadet. Midshipmen work and function as part of the crew and gain an opportunity for generous amounts of hands-on experience as well as the opportunity to travel abroad to many different foreign ports. The average midshipman travels to 18 countries during this period, which totals a minimum of 300 days. Due to this absence from the academy, the remaining three academic years span from late July, through mid-June.

===== Military status of Midshipmen =====
Immediately upon taking the Oath of Office as U.S. Navy reservists, the first year students become members of the U.S. military, subject to various regulations and military discipline under the Uniform Code of Military Justice (UCMJ), and are subject to mobilization policies in the event of war or national emergency.

USMMA graduates must maintain their merchant mariner licensing for 6 years following graduation, and must serve at least 5 years as either a merchant marine officer aboard a U.S.-flagged vessel or with a maritime-related profession, or 5 years of active duty service as a commissioned officer in any of the U.S. Uniformed Services (Army, Navy, Marines, Air Force, Coast Guard, National Oceanic Atmospheric Administration (NOAA), or Public Health Service). All newly commissioned uniformed services officers, active or reserve component, will swear the Oath of Office and serve a minimum military service obligation of 8 years (any portion not served on active duty will be served in the reserve component).

Beginning in 1942, Merchant Marine Academy midshipmen were authorized to wear the Navy Reserve Merchant Marine Insignia and could automatically display this badge on U.S. Navy uniforms upon acceptance of a commission as a reserve naval officer. By the 1990s, especially in light of the somewhat rigorous training requirements for the Surface Warfare Badge, the badge had drawn a negative connotation and was often referred to as the "Sea Chicken". In 1998, the Surface Warfare Officers School (SWOS) prohibited display of the badge by its students. In 2011, the Navy discontinued the badge altogether. Afterwards, a new badge known as the Strategic Sealift Officer Warfare Insignia was issued for merchant marine naval reserve officers, with this badge having qualification standards more identical with the standard surface warfare training pipeline.

==== State maritime academies ====
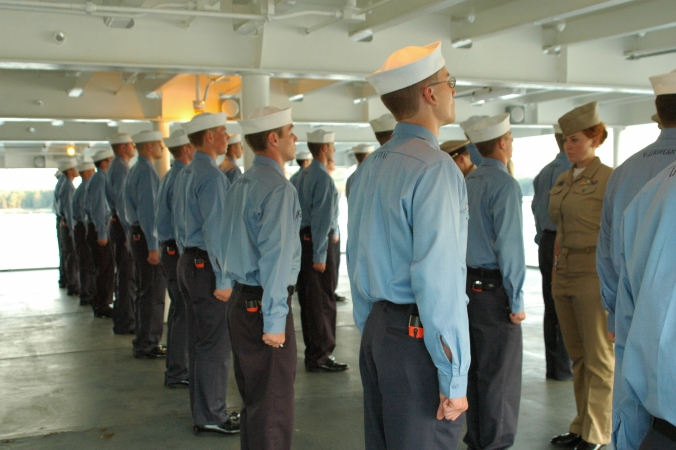
Maine Maritime Academy cadets enduring regimental preparatory training.

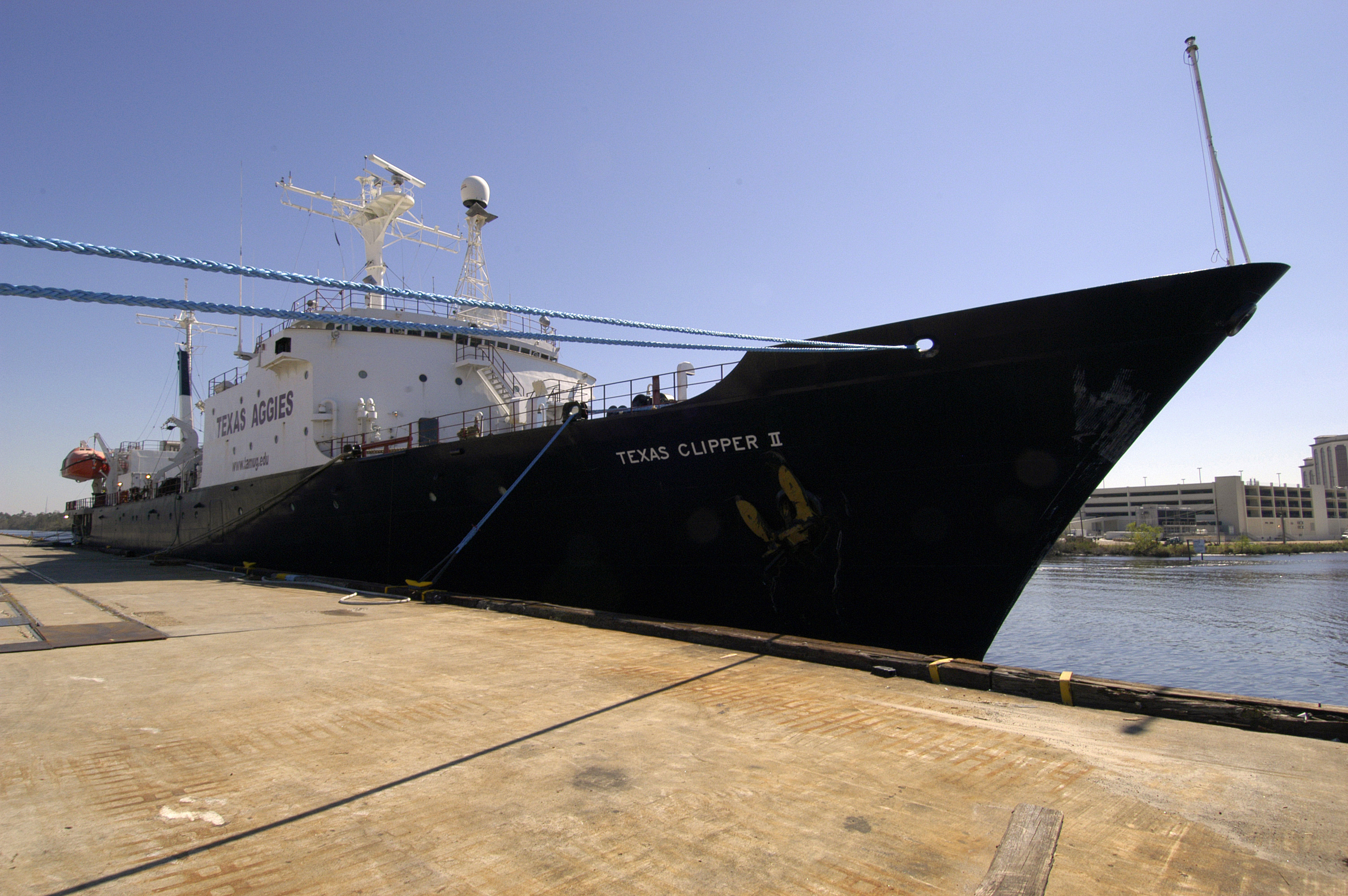
TS Texas Clipper II (1999–2005), training ship for the Texas A&M Maritime Academy

Like the Federal USMMA, the following six state maritime academies offer the same training and licensing opportunities for future United States Merchant Marine officers, with varying USCG-approved programs. Each academy operates their own training ship, which are owned by the U.S. Government and loaned to the academy. These ships act as training laboratories during the academic year, and are sailed on by the cadets during training cruises for months at a time. One example of a training ship is TS Golden Bear, at the California Maritime Academy.

- California Maritime Academy
- Maine Maritime Academy
- Massachusetts Maritime Academy
- State University of New York Maritime College
- Texas A&M Maritime Academy
- The Great Lakes Maritime Academy

Unlike midshipmen from the USMMA, students at any of the state maritime academies are not automatically appointed as members of the Navy Reserve or any branch of the armed forces, nor are they guaranteed commissions as military officers.

Merchant mariner license program cadets at any of the state maritime academies may apply for commission as Strategic Sealift Officers in the Navy Reserve and are eligible to receive an $8,000 annual student incentive payment from MARAD. They must apply for and be accepted to a simultaneous-membership military service program, consisting of both appointment as a midshipman in the Navy Reserve and reserve enlisted status.

After receiving the student incentive payments for 2 years, uniformed service obligations commence upon graduation, or dismissal for any reason from the program. Graduates must comply with their state maritime academy enrollment agreements, and subsequent employment limitations, if any. Women were barred from all U.S. maritime academies until 1974, when the USMMA, State University of New York Maritime College, and the California Maritime Academy first admitted women cadets.

==== Hawsepiper ====
An informal maritime industry term used to refer to a merchant ship's officer who began his or her career as an unlicensed merchant mariner and did not attend a traditional maritime college/academy to earn the officer's license. This term is similar in use and definition to a U.S. naval services "Mustang" who went from enlisted to officer. Hawsepipers earn their officer's license by attaining the required sea time as a rating, taking required training courses, and completing onboard assessments. When all requirements are met, a mariner can apply to the United States Coast Guard's National Maritime Center to take the license examination.

=== Ratings / Unlicensed ===
Unlicensed personnel (synonymous with ratings) are generally trained through several private programs funded by maritime unions, shipping companies, or by one's own expense. An example training institution would be the Paul Hall Center for Maritime Training and Education, or better known as "Piney Point". Generally, merchant mariners work their way up through the rates with sea time on the job. Entry level ratings would be ordinary seaman in the deck department and marine wiper in the engine department.

Unlicensed personnel must have sufficient sea time in a qualified rating and complete specified testing and training. These requirements are outlined in the International Convention on Standards of Training, Certification, and Watchkeeping for Seafarers (STCW), to advance in rate.

=== Limited-tonnage mariners ===
Limited tonnage licensed mariners hold senior positions aboard small ships, boats, and similar vessels, but are restricted to certain tonnages (under 1600 GRT), types of vessels, and geographic locations.

== Important laws ==
Several laws shaped the development of the U.S. Merchant Marine. Chief among them are the "Seamen's Act of 1915," the "Merchant Marine Act of 1920" (commonly referred to as the "Jones Act"), and the "Merchant Marine Act of 1936".

=== The Seamen's Act of 1915 ===
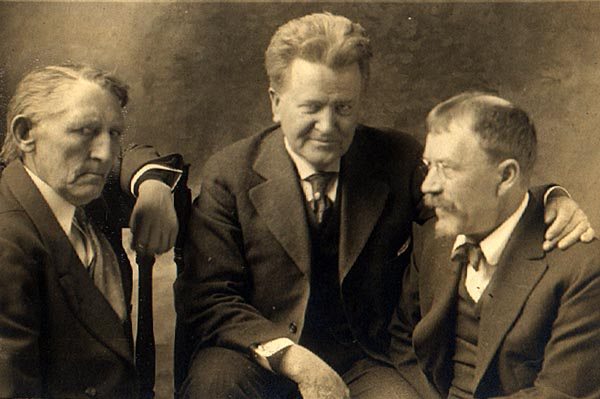
Senator La Follette (center), with maritime labor leader Andrew Furuseth (left) and muckraker Lincoln Steffens, circa 1915.

The Seaman's Act significantly improved working conditions for American Merchant Marine seamen. The brainchild of International Seamen's Union president Andrew Furuseth, the Act was sponsored in the Senate by Robert M. La Follette and received significant support from Secretary of Labor William B. Wilson.

Among other things, the Act:

1. abolished the practice of imprisonment for seamen who deserted their ship;
2. reduced the penalties for disobedience;
3. regulated working hours both at sea and in port;
4. established minimum food quality standards;
5. regulated the payment of wages;
6. required specific levels of safety, particularly the provision of lifeboats;
7. required a minimum percentage of the seamen aboard a vessel to be qualified able seamen; and
8. required a minimum of 75% of the seamen aboard a vessel to understand the language spoken by the officers.

The Act's passage was attributed to labor union lobbying, increased labor tensions immediately before World War I, and elevated public consciousness of safety at sea due to the sinking of the RMS Titanic three years prior.

=== The Jones Act ===
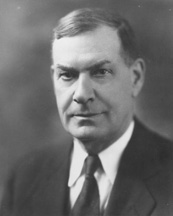
The Jones Act was sponsored by Senator Wesley Livsey Jones of Washington.

The Merchant Marine Act of 1920, commonly known as The Jones Act, requires U.S.-flagged vessels to be built in the United States, owned by U.S. citizens, and documented ("flagged") under the laws of the United States. Documented means "registered, enrolled, or licensed under the laws of the United States", according to The Shipping Act. The Jones Act requires that all officers and 75% of the crew be U.S. citizens.

Vessels satisfying these requirements comprised the Jones Act Fleet. Only compliant vessels may practice cabotage, transporting passengers or cargo between two U.S. ports. It is more costly to document a vessel in the United States than it is in some countries with lower labor standards and wages.

Critics of the act claim it unfairly restricts the lucrative domestic shipping business. Another important aspect of the Act is that it allowed injured sailors to obtain compensation from their employers for the negligence of the owner, the captain, or fellow members of the crew.

=== The Merchant Marine Act ===
The Merchant Marine Act of 1936 was enacted "to further the development and maintenance of an adequate and well-balanced American merchant marine, to promote the commerce of the United States, to aid in the national defense, to repeal certain former legislation, and for other purposes".

Specifically, the Act established the United States Maritime Commission and required a United States Merchant Marine that consisted of U.S.-built, U.S.-flagged, U.S.-crewed, and U.S.-owned vessels capable of carrying all domestic and a substantial portion of foreign water-borne commerce which could serve as a naval auxiliary in time of war or national emergency.

The Act also established federal subsidies for the construction and operation of merchant ships. Two years after the Act was passed, the U.S. Merchant Marine Cadet Corps, the forerunner to the United States Merchant Marine Academy, was established.

=== International regulations ===
Federal law requires the Merchant Marine to adhere to a number of international conventions. The International Maritime Organization was either the source or a conduit for a number of these regulations.

As of 2007, the principal International Conventions were:

- SOLAS 74: International Convention for the Safety of Life at Sea;
- MARPOL 73/78: International Convention for the Prevention of Pollution From Ships, 1973, as modified by the Protocol of 1978;
- ICLL 66: International Convention on Load Lines, as revised in 1966;
- 72 COLREGS: International Regulations for Preventing Collisions at Sea;
- STCW 95: International Convention on Standards of Training, Certification and Watchkeeping for Seafarers (STCW); and
- SAR 79: International Convention on Maritime Search and Rescue.

== Noted U.S. Merchant Mariners ==
- Richard Jaeckel an American actor of film and television. His career spanned over six decades on the big screen.
- John Paul Jones sailed as both third mate and chief mate, then went on to become the "Father of the American Navy".
- John F. Kelly, 28th White House Chief of Staff, 5th Homeland Security Secretary, four-star Marine Corps general
- Douglass North went from seaman to navigator to winner of the 1993 Nobel Memorial Prize in Economics.
- After completing service in the Merchant Marine, two merchant mariners earned the Medal of Honor: George H. O'Brien Jr., earned the award in the Korean War; and Lawrence Joel earned the honor in the Vietnam War

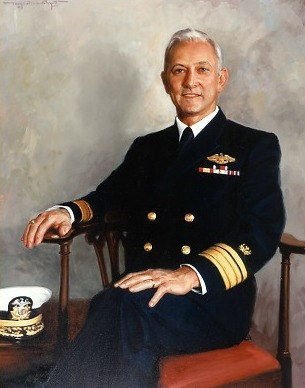
Paul L. Krinsky seen wearing the Navy reserve Merchant Marine insignia and Merchant Marine officer's crest

- Rear Admiral Paul Krinsky, Superintendent of the Merchant Marine Academy.
- Rear Admiral Albert B. Randall, nicknamed "Rescue Randall", led convoys across the Atlantic during WWI and was the first merchant marine officer ever to receive the high rank of rear admiral. Chevalier of the Legion of Honour.
- Sadie O. Horton, who spent World War II working aboard a coastwise U.S. Merchant Marine barge, posthumously received official veteran's status for her wartime service in 2017, becoming the first recorded female Merchant Marine veteran of World War II.
- Some became notorious criminals: William Colepaugh was convicted as a Nazi spy in World War II; Perry Smith's murderous rampage in 1959 was made famous in Truman Capote's non-fiction novel In Cold Blood; and George Hennard was a mass murderer who claimed 23 victims on a shooting rampage at Luby's Cafeteria in Killeen, Texas, in 1991.
- Mariners are well represented in the visual arts: Johnny Craig was already a working comic book artist before he joined up, but Ernie Schroeder would not start drawing comics until after returning home from World War II; Haskell Wexler won two Academy Awards, the latter for a biography of his shipmate Woody Guthrie.
- Merchant sailors have also made a splash in the world of sports: Drew Bundini Brown was Muhammad Ali's assistant trainer and cornerman, and Joe Gold made his fortune as the bodybuilding and fitness guru of Gold's Gym; in football, Dan Devine and Heisman Trophy winner Frank Sinkwich excelled; Jim Bagby Jr., and Charlie Keller played in Major League Baseball; in track and field, Cornelius Johnson and Jim Thorpe both won Olympic medals, though Thorpe did not get his until 30 years after his death.
- Writers Richard Henry Dana Jr., Ralph Ellison, Herman Melville, Louis L'Amour, Thomas Pynchon, and Jack Vance were merchant mariners, as were prominent members of the Beat movement: Allen Ginsberg, Herbert Huncke, Bob Kaufman, Jack Kerouac, Hubert Selby Jr. and Dave Van Ronk. Peter Baynham, the coauthor of the film Borat, and Donn Pearce, who wrote the movie Cool Hand Luke, were formerly merchant mariners.

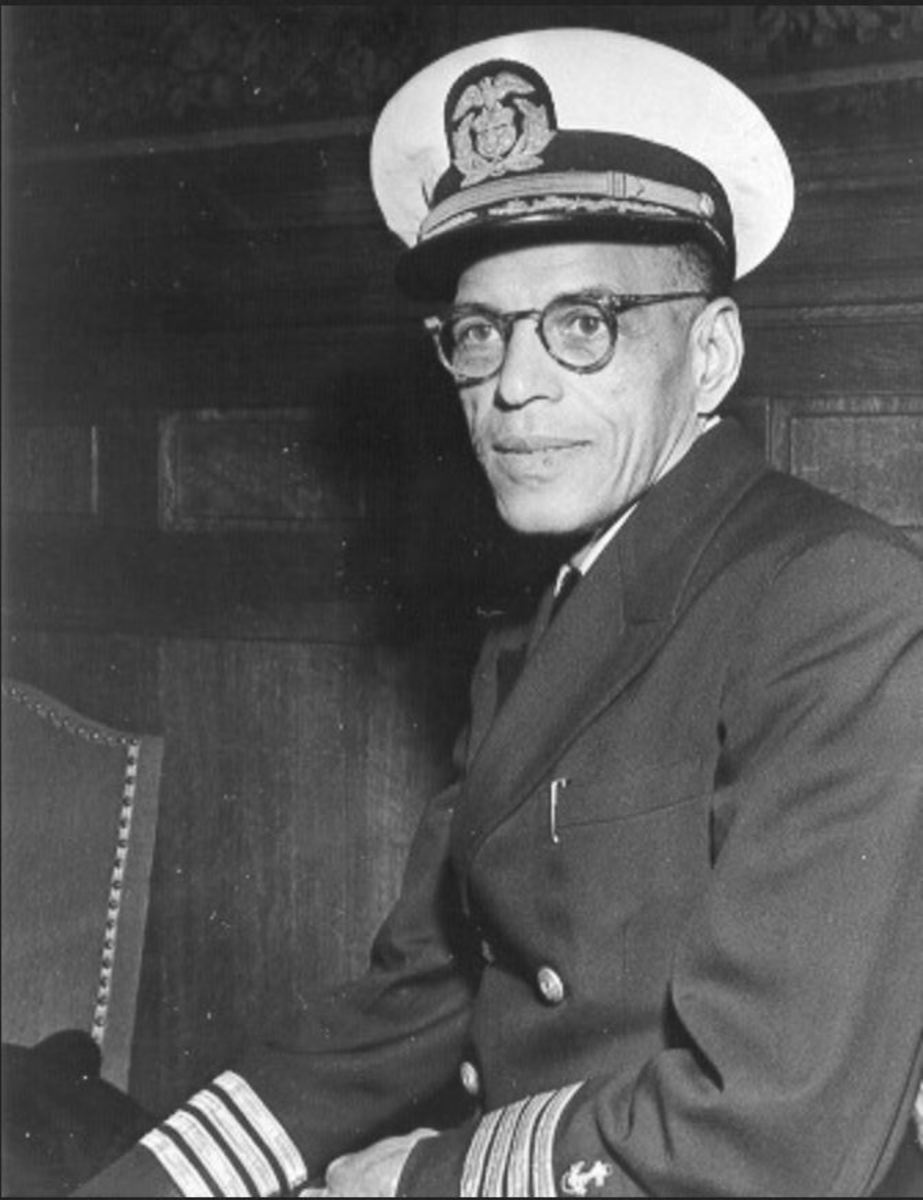
Hugh Mulzac, who in 1942 became the first African-American to captain a Merchant Marine ship.

- Filmmaker Oliver Stone won multiple Academy Awards, and David Mamet, American playwright, essayist, screenwriter, and film director, worked as a merchant mariner, with the experience influencing his work Lakeboat.
- World War II-era merchant mariners played well-known television characters, including: Raymond Bailey (who played Milburn Drysdale on The Beverly Hillbillies); Peter Falk (who played the title character on Columbo); James Garner (who played Jim Rockford on The Rockford Files); Jack Lord (who played Steve McGarrett on the original Hawaii Five-0); Carroll O'Connor (who played Archie Bunker on All in the Family); Denver Pyle (who played Uncle Jesse Duke on The Dukes of Hazzard); and Clint Walker (who played Cheyenne Bodie on Cheyenne).
- Songwriter and lyricist Jack Lawrence was a merchant mariner during World War II and wrote the official United States Merchant Marine song, "Heave Ho! My Lads, Heave Ho!" while a young lieutenant stationed at Sheepshead Bay, Brooklyn, in 1943.
- Paul Teutul Sr., the founder of Orange County Choppers and Orange County Ironworks, was a merchant mariner during the Vietnam War.
- Captain Richard Phillips, Maersk Alabama was captain during a Somali piracy attack.
- Merrill Kenneth Albert was a merchant mariner who served as a first mate on Liberty Ships during World War II. He was the youngest first mate to ever receive his captain's papers, and later became one of Los Angeles' most celebrated trial lawyers.
- Colonel David Hackworth, a highly decorated veteran of the Korean and Vietnam Wars, worked briefly as a merchant mariner before joining the U.S. Army.

== Recipients of the Merchant Marine Distinguished Service Medal ==
The Merchant Marine Distinguished Service Medal is the highest award for valor which can be bestowed upon members of the United States Merchant Marine and is the Merchant Marine's equivalent of the Medal of Honor. The following Merchant Marine World War II combat veterans received the Medal for extraordinary heroism:

- Paul Buck (United States Merchant Marine), Captain (posthumous)
- Edwin Joseph O'Hara, USMMA midshipman (posthumous)
- Francis A. Dales, USMMA midshipman

== In popular culture ==
The United States Merchant Marine has been featured in many movies and other fictional accounts.

=== In animations and cartoons ===
- Popeye was a merchant mariner first before joining the U.S. Coast Guard.
- Pete, during World War II, was "drafted" by Walt Disney and appeared as the official mascot of the United States Merchant Marine.

=== Onscreen ===
==== World War II fare ====
- Action in the North Atlantic: a 1943 film featuring Humphrey Bogart, Raymond Massey, and Alan Hale Sr., as merchant mariners fighting the Battle of the Atlantic in World War II;
- The Long Voyage Home: starring John Wayne; and
- The Enemy Below: the character of Lieutenant Commander Murrell (played by Robert Mitchum) says that he is a "retread" i.e., a merchant marine officer commissioned for war service in the U.S. Navy.

==== Other movies prominently featuring the United States Merchant Marine ====
- The Finest Hours: based on a true story of the SS Pendleton rescue mission;
- The Last Voyage;
- Lifeboat;
- The Sea Chase;
- Action in the North Atlantic;
- Wake of the Red Witch;
- The Wreck of the Mary Deare;
- Lakeboat;
- Inside Llewyn Davis; and
- The Greatest Beer Run Ever.

==== On television ====
- On the soap opera Days of Our Lives, the characters Bo Brady and Steve "Patch" Johnson were merchant mariners;
- On the popular 1960s television sitcom Gilligan's Island, Captain Jonas Grumby (the "Skipper"), was variously referred to as having been formerly in the Merchant Marine and in the U.S. Navy;
- On the popular 1960s television sitcom Leave It to Beaver, Wally's friend Lumpy receives informational book and application for the merchant marine.
- On the popular 1960s television sitcom McHale's Navy, lead character, Lt. Cmdr. Quinton McHale, was referred to as a member of the Merchant Marine before World War II;
- On the 1980s sitcom Punky Brewster, Henry P. Warnimont (George Gaynes) – adoptive father of the title character – was a merchant mariner;
- On the 1960s family program My Three Sons, the character Uncle Charley O'Casey (William Demarest) had worked as a merchant mariner prior to coming to live in the Douglas home;
- In the 1970s TV series Baretta, the title character played by Robert Blake often mentions that he worked as a merchant mariner before becoming a police officer;
- In the 1970s series Taxi, the father of character played by Tony Danza, Tony Banta, worked as a merchant seaman, and in the episode "Travels With My Dad", Tony gets a job on a merchant ship so that he and his dad can spend time together;
- Vance Duke, played by Christopher Mayer in Season 5 of The Dukes of Hazzard, had worked as a merchant mariner;
- Ben Cartwright of Bonanza had worked as a merchant mariner – and married the daughter of the ship's captain.
- In the 2007 The Suite Life of Zack & Cody episode "A Nugget of History", Zack learns from Mr. Moseby's grandmother about merchant mariner Hugh Mulzac and his commanding of the first fully-integrated vessel, SS Booker T. Washington, which he writes a paper about for his history class

=== Onstage ===
In Tennessee Williams' play The Glass Menagerie, the character Tom Wingfield leaves his family to join the Merchant Marine.

=== In literature ===
- Travers, Hal (1967). Voyage sixty-nine. Rancocas, New Jersey: Dorset Publishing Co. OCLC 3764865. A humorous tale of a post World War II merchant marine radio operator, with unexpurgated colorful language, profanity, and maritime union shenanigans;
- The Death Ship, by B. Traven, is about a merchant mariner;
- The Great Green, Memoirs of a Merchant Mariner, by Calvin Kentfield, is a nonfiction account of the author's work as a merchant mariner;
- Looking For a Ship, by John McPhee, is about a merchant mariner;
- Hell Around The Horn, by Rick Spilman, is set mostly aboard a merchant ship;
- Woody Cisco and Me: Seamen Three In The Merchant Marine, by Jim Longhi, is about the adventures of the author and his friends Woody Guthrie and Cisco Houston as merchant mariners during World War II;
- The Sea Is My Brother, by Jack Kerouac, is about merchant mariners;
- Steaming To Bamboola, by Christopher Buckley, is about a merchant ship;
- The Seas That Mourn by Patrick D. Smith is a riveting story of the Merchant Marine in World War II
- A Commodore of Errors by John Jacobsen is a comedy set at the Merchant Marine Academy.

== See also ==
- United States Merchant Marine Academy
- Awards and decorations of the United States Merchant Marine
- Military Sealift Command
- Merchant Navy (United Kingdom)
- Royal Fleet Auxiliary
- Maritime Militia (China)
- The Marine Society
- National Maritime Day
- Navy Reserve Merchant Marine Insignia
- United States Maritime Service
- World War II United States Merchant Navy

== Notes ==
- "American Merchant Marine at War". usmm.org. Archived from the original on February 28, 2011.
- "Casualty statistics World War II". usmm.org. Archived from the original on October 25, 2006.
- "GAO-14-93, Military Personnel, Actions Needed to Improve Evaluation and Oversight of Reserve Officers' Training Corps Programs" (PDF). United States Government Accountability Office, Report to Congressional Committees.
