= Motorman (ship) =

Member of a marine engine department

In merchant shipping, a motorman is an engine department rating aboard a vessel, responsible for supporting the operation, maintenance, and repair of engine room machinery and related equipment. The duties of a motorman typically include assisting with routine watchkeeping and machinery inspections, lubrication and upkeep of auxiliary systems, and other routine engine room tasks as directed by senior engineering personnel. The specific scope of duties varies with vessel type and company practice.

While “motorman” is commonly used informally to describe a general engine room rating, it is not itself a defined regulatory term in U.S. merchant marine regulations. A motorman serves under the supervision of licensed engineering officers, typically held by the chief engineer or, among ratings, by a leading motorman or chief motorman (titles and hierarchy may vary by company or vessel).

== United States ==
In the United States Merchant Marine, in order to be occupied as a Qualified Member of the Engine Department (QMED) a person has to have a Merchant Mariner Credential issued by the United States Coast Guard with a QMED certification. Under U.S. law, a QMED is a mariner who holds a Merchant Mariner Credential (MMC) endorsed as a QMED, and who is above the rating of wiper or coal passer but below the level of engine officer.

Applicants for QMED are required to pass a QMED General Knowledge Examination and at least one of the following rating exams:

1. Fireman/Watertender
2. Oiler
3. Junior Engineer
4. Electrician/Refrigerating Engineer
5. Pumpman/Machinist

As per international conventions and agreements, QMEDs who sail internationally are similarly documented by their respective countries.

== See also ==
- Engineering department
- Seafarer's professions and ranks
