= Pumpman =

Worker on tankers that operate the liquid cargo transfer system

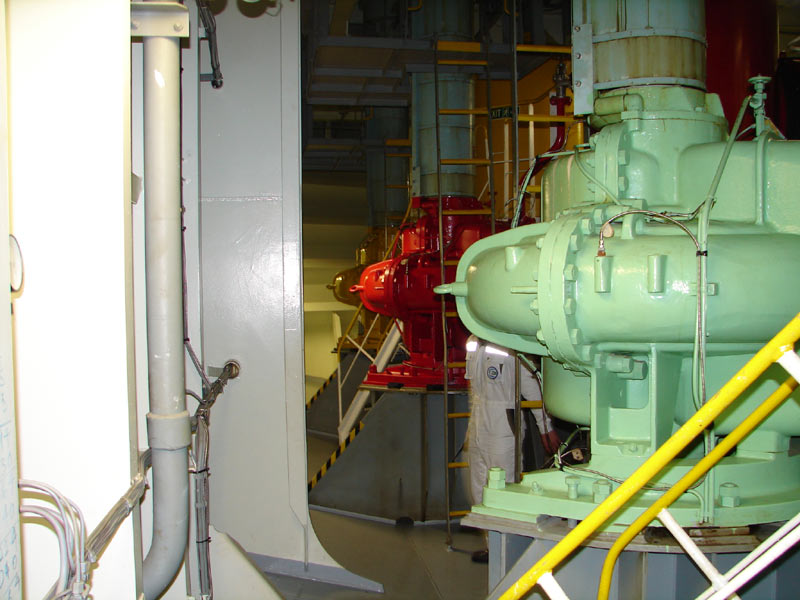
- Performing maintenance on an oil tankers cargo pump

General
- Department: Deck Department
- Duties: Care and maintenance of liquid cargo system
- Requirements: Training above entry level

Watchstanding
- Watchstander: Cargo watch

A pumpman is an unlicensed member of the Deck Department of a merchant ship. Pumpmen are found almost exclusively on tankers, and on oil tankers in particular. Variations on the title can include chief pumpman, QMED/pumpman, and second pumpman.

A pumpman performs all work necessary for the safe and proper operation of the liquid cargo transfer system. This includes but is not limited to: liquid cargo transfer pumps, liquid cargo stripping pumps, liquid cargo coalesces and separators, strainers, filters, associated piping, valves, fittings, and deck machinery directly related to the transfer of liquid cargo.

== Maintenance ==
The pumpman's job is to keep the liquid cargo system on a tanker running. The liquid cargo system consists of several components. A major component is the pumps themselves, including not only the liquid cargo transfer pumps but also the liquid cargo stripping pumps. Another component consists of the equipment that conditions the cargo, including liquid cargo coalescers and separators, strainers, and filters. The third component consists of all the piping, valves, fittings, and deck machinery directly related to the transfer of liquid cargo.

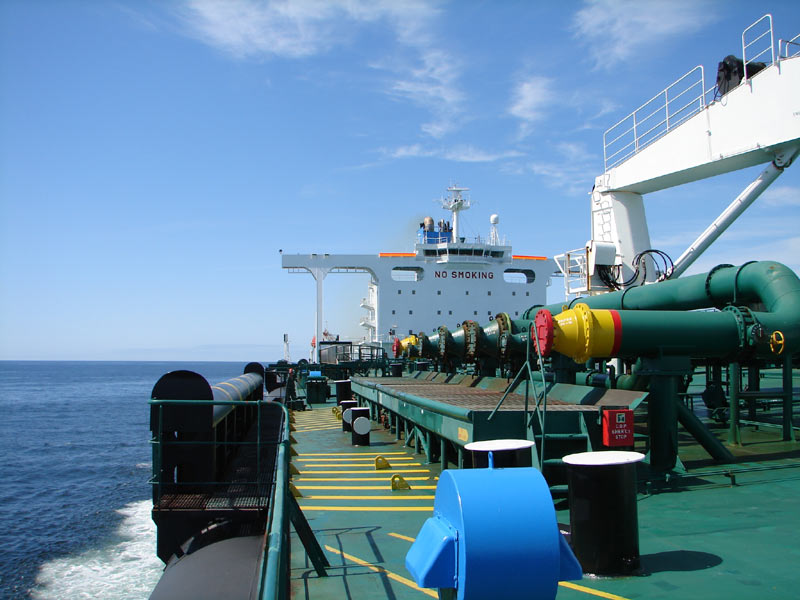
Pumpmen also maintain the cargo lines and connection manifolds.

The pumpman's job has three aspects: repairing equipment when it breaks, monitoring equipment to ensure it is working, and maintaining equipment to prevent breakage. Many organizations, such as the United States Navy use planned- and preventive-maintenance systems to guide the pumpman in identifying and scheduling required maintenance actions.

Some common activities include rebuilding valves pumps and correcting leaks in the cargo system. Pumpmen also often repack valves and glands. Pumpmen also spend a lot of time lubricating parts, such as glands, bearings and reach rods.

On some ships, pumpmen are responsible for the ballast system, room heating systems, and other engine department duties.

== General duties ==
Those that work aboard ships have general duties, in addition to their job-specific duties. For the pumpman, this largely translates to proficiency during drills and actual emergencies. The pumpman will participate in shipboard drills such as engineering casualty drills, fire drills, and collision drills, and must be able to perform assigned duties and carry out instructions safely and efficiently. As a non-entry level rating, the pumpman is expected to take the initiative in emergencies without specific orders or instructions, and have a complete knowledge of safety policies and practices. Some policies that are particularly important to the pumpman rating include handling of flammable/dangerous liquids, confined space entry procedures, and the ship's tag-out program.

== Working conditions ==
Merchant mariners spend extended periods at sea. Most deep-sea mariners are hired for one or more voyages that last for several months; there is no job security after that. The length of time between voyages varies depending on job availability and personal preference.

At sea, a pumpman will usually work 8- to 12-hour days, 7 days a week.

People in water transportation occupations work in all weather conditions. Although merchant mariners try to avoid severe storms while at sea, working in damp and cold conditions often is inevitable. While it is uncommon nowadays for vessels to suffer disasters such as fire, explosion, or a sinking, workers face the possibility that they may have to abandon their craft on short notice if it collides with other vessels or runs aground. They also risk injury or death from falling overboard and hazards associated with working with machinery, heavy loads, and dangerous cargo. However, modern safety management procedures, advanced emergency communications, and effective international rescue systems place modern mariners in a much safer position.

Most newer vessels are air conditioned, soundproofed from noisy machinery, and equipped with comfortable living quarters. For some mariners, these amenities have helped ease the sometimes difficult circumstances of long periods away from home. Also, modern communications, especially email, link modern mariners to their families. Nevertheless, some mariners dislike the long periods away from home and the confinement aboard ship and consequently leave the occupation.

In the United States, the rate of unionization for these workers is about 36 percent, much higher than the average for all occupations. Consequently, merchant marine officers and seamen, both veterans and beginners, are hired for voyages through union hiring halls or directly by shipping companies. Hiring halls rank the candidates by the length of time the person has been out of work and fill open slots accordingly. Hiring halls typically are found in major seaports.

Pumpmen employed on Great Lakes ships work 60 days and have 30 days off, but do not work in the winter when the lakes are frozen. Workers on rivers, on canals, and in harbors are more likely to have year-round work. Some work 8-hour or 12-hour shifts and go home every day. Others work steadily for a week or a month and then have an extended period off. When working, they usually are on duty for 6 or 12 hours and off for 6 or 12 hours. Those on smaller vessels are normally assigned to one vessel and have steady employment.

== See also ==
- Seafarer's professions and ranks
- Engine room
- Engineering department
- Motorman (ship)
- Wiper (occupation)
