= Wiper (occupation) =

Occupation on a ship or train

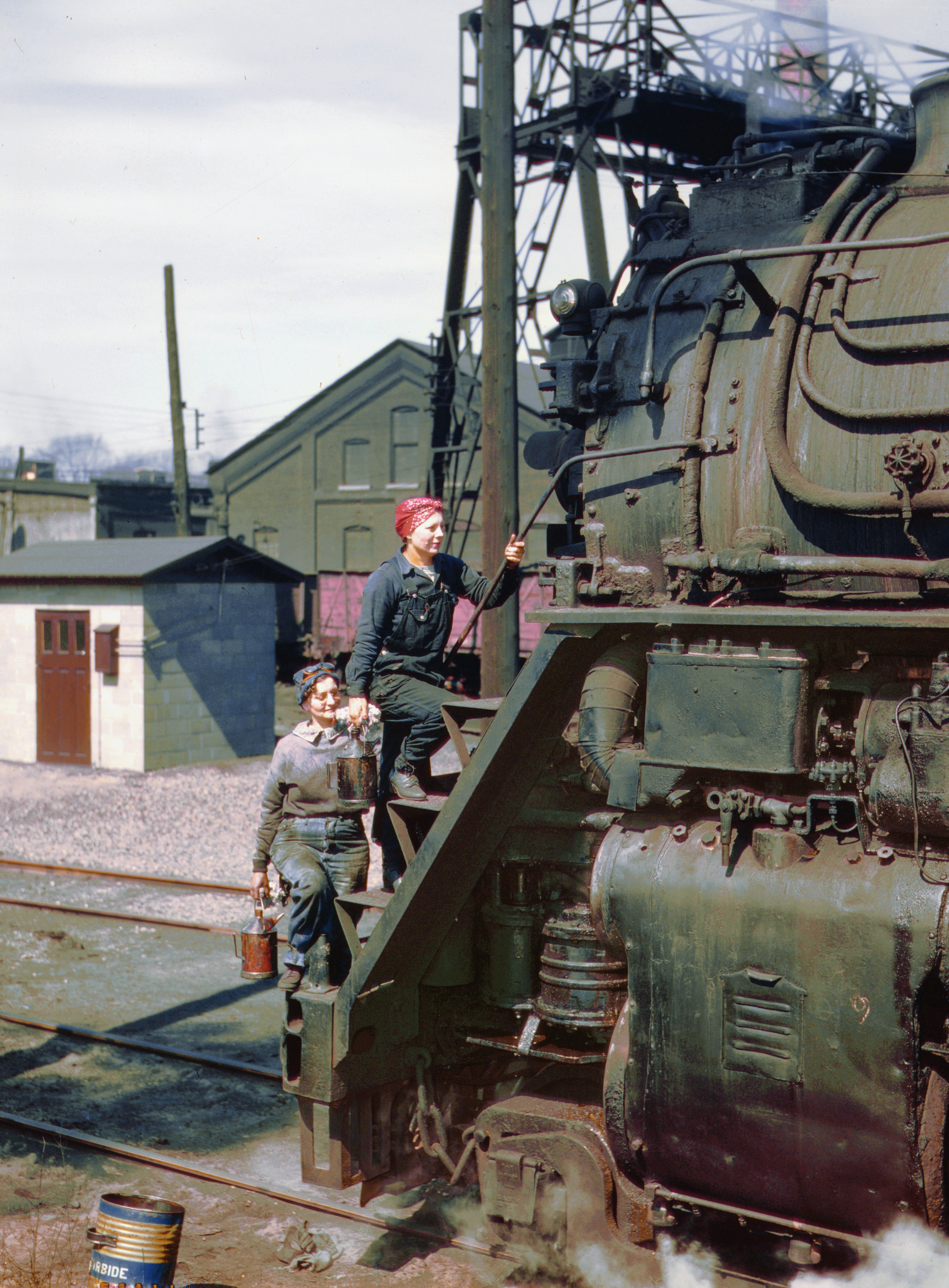
Women wipers of the Chicago and North Western Railroad cleaning one of the 4-8-4 "Northern" H-class steam locomotives, Clinton, Iowa, 1943

A wiper is a position responsible for both cleaning the engine spaces and machinery of a ship and assisting the ship's engineers as directed. Railroad workers who performed similar jobs were also known as wipers, or in the UK as "cleaners".

The most junior rate in a ship's engine room, the wiper position is an apprenticeship to become an oiler. In modern times, a wiper is required to work on a ship for a specific amount of time, gaining what is referred to as "sea time."

In the United States Merchant Marine, in order to be occupied as a wiper a person has to have a Merchant Mariner's Document and STCW certificate issued by the United States Coast Guard. Because of international conventions and agreements, all wipers who sail internationally are similarly documented by their respective countries.

== Duties ==
As a wiper aboard a United States Merchant Marine vessel or any International Maritime Organization (IMO) certified merchant shipping vessel, the diversity of operational duties is inherent and must be approached as such. Typically, with little experience, a wiper may work under the close supervision of trained and qualified engineers of the engineering department belonging to the vessel.

Taking commands and directions from the 1st Assistant Engineer, the Chief Engineers’ foremost subordinate, the wiper is in charge of, but not wholly responsible for, maintenance ranging from chipping in the bilges to painting of the overhead in the machinery spaces. Additional duties include assisting of licensed engineers, filling in for Qualified Members of the Engine Department (QMED) when necessary, and standing as a member of the watch team but not assigned watches. Duties while serving day work, typically while in port or underway, involve cleaning and degreasing of equipment, greasing of parts, and oversight of all machinery spaces in terms of cleanness.

The wiper position is the lowest-ranking unlicensed position in the engineering department. The wiper position is designated for apprentices to the engineering department where a basic working knowledge of plant layout is learned. Work to be performed by a wiper is typically of low-stakes nature and is meant to create a work-positive environment where sea time may be secured towards licensure. As the typical wiper is aboard a vessel and underway, although they may be found in land-based operations such as railroading as well, they must be fluent in ship operations and have familiarity with safety equipment used.

As the United States Merchant Marine is strict in compliance of international organization's precedent in regards to regulations on shipping, having to adhere to the standards set by the IMO, many of the same requirements can be found for vessels that do not serve under the United States Jones Act. In relation to this requirement, a wiper is to be sufficiently trained on how to carry out firefighting operations; this includes the proper donning, assembly, use, and maintenance of all equipment involved should the need arise in order to facilitate the need for all seafarers to be fluent in lifesaving procedures.

These requirements are mandatory and are also adhered to on an international and involuntary basis with the need to renew the same preliminary physical and firefighting examinations found within CFR 46. The global institution responsible for mandating standards for lifesaving procedures and equipment is commonly known as the International Convention for the Safety of Life At Sea (SOLAS).

== General qualifications ==
Little paperwork and qualification is needed to secure a position as a wiper as there are very few preliminary requirements to be found internationally. The only documentation needed is a Merchant Mariners Document (MMD) or a United States approved certification as a wiper. For those looking at work internationally, an IMO approved document will suffice for employment and will be required for anyone not sailing in the United States; A United States MMD is not recognized by international shipping organizations. A Transportation Worker Identification Credential (TWIC) is required to apply for an MMD or a QMED program.

Requirements for those applying for a QMED credential include the following:

- Be at least 18 years of age
- Undergo a medical evaluation
- Pass an illicit substance screening
- Be able to fluently communicate in the English language in the ways that ship duties would require. Greater detail of this process can be illustrated in Code of Federal Regulations (CFR 46).

By passing tests administered, an individual may claim a QMED credential and begin accruing sea time in order to apply for higher positions in the maritime industry such as the Third Assistant Engineer.

Much of this same process applies for international wipers although there are minor discrepancies between the U.S. Coast Guard and other international licensure departments. This process can be greatly reduced in duration through enrollment in one of seven offered United States Coast Guard (USCG) approved and accredited maritime academies, such as California Maritime Academy and U.S. Merchant Marine Academy, whose programs offer a mix of applied technologies courses and opportunities to accrue sea time. In addition, there are several international maritime academies, such as Svendborg International Maritime Academy, which specialize in the growing demands for environmental protection, the safety of workers, and the efficiency of shipping across the globe.

== Union affiliation and organization ==
Union Affiliation and Jones Act mariners are closely related in terms of interaction, and the proliferation of labor unions is mainstream across the United States and the world. Seafarer's labor unions are meant to primarily protect sailors and their interests while serving as financial strongholds to support internal operations and communication, deal in the costs of lawsuits and other court procedures, and to reward its members in various ways. The payment for these undertakings come primarily from union dues which are deducted from the pay check of a member in the form of a percentage.

Unions such as Marine Engineers’ Beneficial Association (MEBA) and the Marine Firemen, Oilers, Water tenders, and Wipers Association (MFOW) are a staple of employment for those sailing in the United States. These labor unions lobby for increased rights in the workplace and establish deals between employers and workers which call for benefits of varying degree and magnitude. These benefits include guaranteed meal times, coffee breaks, overtime, medical insurance, paid vacation, and other sorts of hazard payment.

The voicing of grievances is relatively commonplace in maritime labor unions, much like shore-based skilled labor operations, and protectionist legislation is deliberated during meetings, protests, lawsuits, and on occasion United States Supreme Court precedent. Unions internationally follow the same structure of deliberation between employees and employers that can serve as arenas to bid for changes from within.

== See also ==
- Seafarer's professions and ranks
- Engine room
- Engineering department
- Motorman (ship)
- Oiler (occupation)
