= Fourth engineer =

Shipboard occupation

General
- Other names: Third assistant engineer
- Department: Engine department
- Reports to: Chief engineer, second engineer, third engineer
- Licensed: Yes Merchant Mariner Credential
- Duties: Daily maintenance and operation in the engine department
- Requirements: Completed 4 year course at academy or complete exams as unlicensed engineer with required sea time

Watchstanding
- Watchstander: Depends on manned or unmanned engine room, may be called in to do security watches when in port
- Watch (at sea): Engine room on board ships (2000-0000, 0000-0400, 0400-0800, 0800-1200, 1200-1600, 1600-1800, 1800-2000)
- Watch (in port): Engine room, security checkpoint (1600-2400)

A fourth engineer or third assistant engineer is the most Junior engine officer in the engine department of a merchant vessel.

== Summary ==
A third assistant engineer’s license is by a Maritime Administration in accordance with the International Convention on the Standards and Training of Watchkeepers that allows the recipient to work on board any vessel up to the rank of a fourth engineer or below. Third assistant engineers do most of the general labor among the officers, as well as leading the oilers and other engine room crew. Depending on the style of ship, company, and other factors, they are called "the third" or "the fourth," usually stand a watch and sometimes assist the third mate in maintaining proper operation of the lifeboats. This credential, is earned by cadets who complete engineering training at an authorised maritime academy.

American 3rd assistant engineers can receive an optional commission as ensign in the U.S. Naval Reserve, Merchant Marine Reserve, or Coast Guard Reserve. With experience and additional training, third officers may qualify for higher rank.

== Duties ==
The general duties for a third assistant engineer (fourth engineer) differ from ship to ship. The third assistant engineer is generally in charge of keeping the plant in operation, with command being passed down and being delegated by whomever is on watch. They are trained to be competent in a wide variety of fields such as HVAC (heating, ventilation, and air conditioning), electronics, hydraulics, engine room auxiliary machinery and the operation and maintenance of both steam and diesel propulsion plants. Duties will vary from ship to ship, but the Fourth Engineer is expected to handle tasks in all areas of the ship. As with all seafarers, the third assistant engineer is an integral part of the emergency response with critical technical knowledge.

== Training ==
The rank of third assistant engineer can be earned by one of two ways, either through training and an approved cadetship program or by advancing from an engine room rating, colloquially termed hawsepiping. Both tracks require the individual to complete specific training in order to meet the requirements set out by STCW Convention.

Engineer officers, as with all merchant seaman, are required to complete basic safety training. This may include training in Firefighting, Damage control, First Aid, and survival.

== Unions and Professional Organizations ==
U.S. maritime licensed and non-licensed crew are mandated to be part of one of many of the unions. The maritime industry is a closed shop style of union. There are two primary Unions that a third assistant engineer (fourth engineer) may become associated with, the Marine Engineers' Beneficial Association and American Maritime Officers. These unions protect the maritime industry by protecting the workers and amassing the billets for maritime workers to take for jobs. Most of these billets run for 30, 60, or 90 days.

The Institute of Marine Engineering, Science and Technology is an international professional organisation that represents seagoing and shoreside Officers and Professionals in the wider Marine Engineering community.

== See also ==
- Seafarer's professions and ranks
- Engine room
- Engine department
