= Second engineer =

Shipboard occupation

General
- Other names: First assistant engineer
- Department: Engine department
- Reports to: Chief engineer
- Licensed: Yes
- Duties: Supervising the daily maintenance and operation of the engine department
- Requirements: Administration and logistics training.

Watchstanding
- Watchstander: Depends on shipboard manning requirements
- Watch (at sea): Varies (0400-0800, 1600-2000)
- Watch (in port): Varies (0800-1700)

A second engineer or first assistant engineer is a licensed member of the engineering department on a merchant vessel. This title is used for the person on a ship responsible for supervising the daily maintenance and operation of the engine department. They report directly to the chief engineer.

On a merchant vessel, depending on term usage, "the First" or "the Second" is the marine engineer second in command of the engine department after the ship's chief engineer. Due to the supervisory role this engineer plays, in addition to being responsible for the refrigeration systems, main engines (steam/gas turbine, diesel), and any other equipment not assigned to the third engineer or fourth engineer(s), he is typically the busiest engineer aboard the ship. If the engine room requires 24/7 attendance and other junior engineers can cover the three watch rotations, the first is usually a "day worker" from 0800-1700, with overtime hours varying according to ship/company.

The second engineer is usually in charge of preparing the engine room for arrival, departure, or standby and oversees major overhauls on critical equipment.

== Duties and functions ==
The main duty of a second engineer on board a ship is to schedule and direct maintenance inside the engine room. As the chief may not be able to be in the engine room every day, due to paperwork or meetings, it is the second engineer's responsibility to report on the plant conditions and needs. A second engineer has to be familiar with their ships systems, repair schedules, and test results obtained from oil or water samples.

Each day tasks are typically distributed by the second engineer on what needs to be maintained within the plant and advice is typically given as the second engineer is the most senior engineer on day work. Tasks are typically given in order of seniority or necessity, such as officers receiving more important jobs while non-licensed members receiving a more tedious job. Because of being the most senior engineer on day work, the second engineer must have knowledge of basic systems and be able to work out of technical guides to be able to upkeep machinery to manufacturers specifications.

The first engineer may stand a watch if it is the ship’s protocol or in the event of a manned engine room. With modern technology many engine rooms have become unmanned, but the second engineer must be on call in case an emergency were to occur at any time of day, both at sea and port.

The second engineer reports directly to the chief engineer daily and assists with paperwork and administrative duties as needed. This includes safety checks and duties that the chief may not have time to accomplish.

== Licensing ==
=== United States ===
In order to sail as a first assistant engineer on a US ship, an engineer is required to have a non-expired license given by the US Coast Guard. To be qualified to hold a national First Assistant Engineer license for unlimited tonnage vessels, one must have over one year of experience as a second assistant engineer, one year experience as a chief aboard a limited tonnage vessel. To qualify for a second assistant engineer one must have at least year experience as a third assistant engineer. Obtaining a third assistant engineer’s licence can be achieved in many ways. The two most common ways being to have graduated from a certified maritime academy or accumulating experience by working as lower member of the engine department, often referred to as "hawsepipping" or "climbing the hawsepipe".

==== Certified Institution ====
By attending a certified maritime institution, such as the US Merchant Marine Academy or one of six maritime academies (Maine, Massachusetts, New York, Great Lakes, Texas, and California) students attend special classes designed to teach the skills necessary to become a third mate or engineer. By attending any of these academies students gain "sea time" by attending specific classes which is equivalent to time that an apprentice would be aboard a ship doing work and learning similar skills. While attending any one of these certified institutions, engineering students meet requirements for STCW standards and are streamlined through the process of becoming an officer over the course of four years. In their final year students are tested by the US Coast Guard on various ship systems, such as gas turbines or diesel propulsion for engineers or navigation and signals for mates. After passing all the exams and graduating, engineering students can choose to become third assistant engineers.

==== Apprenticeship ====
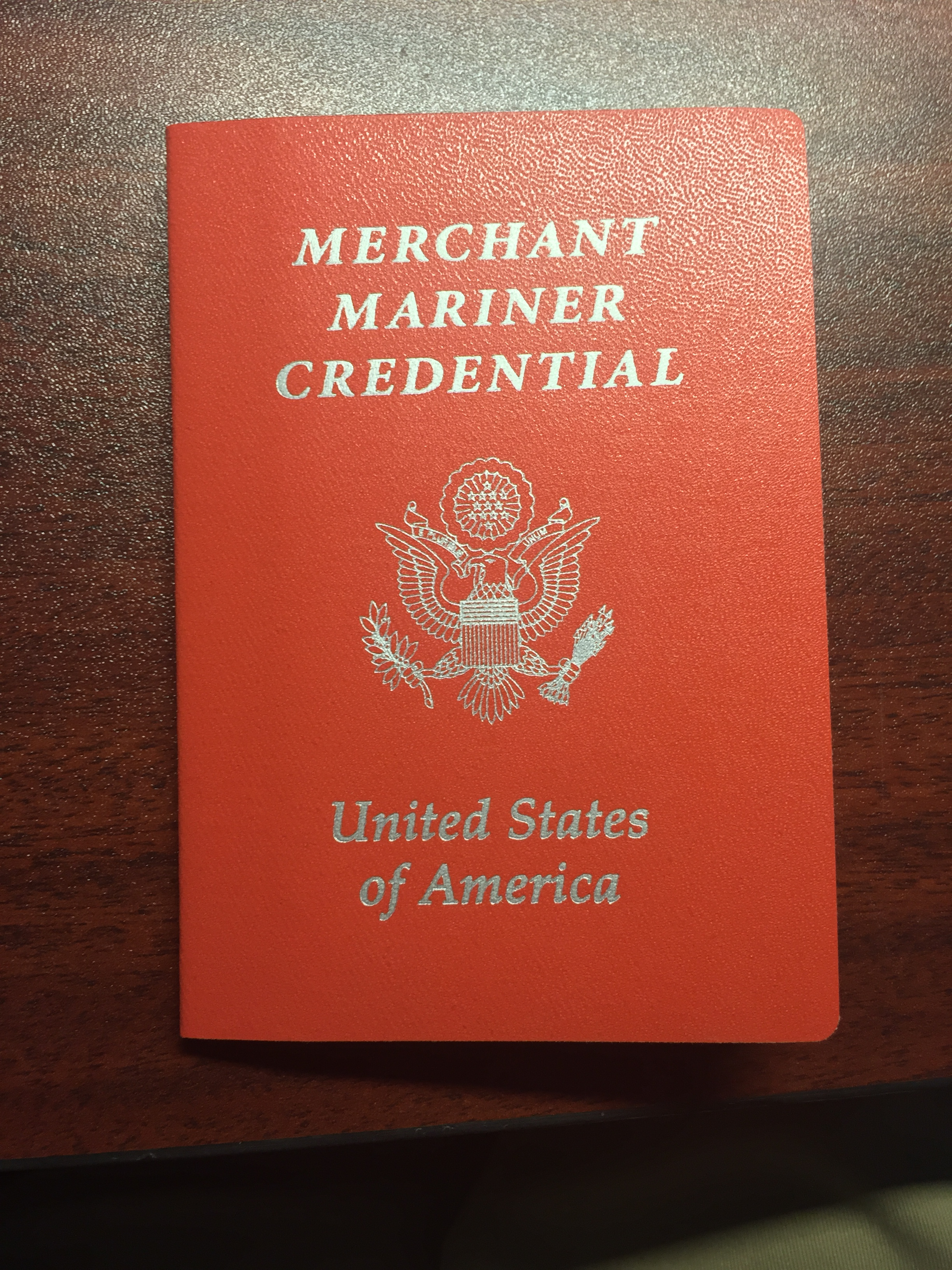
A sample of a credential given by the US Coast Guard to all officers, containing what vessels they are certified to work aboard

One can also begin the process by working as a lower member of the engine department, such as a wiper, for a minimum of three years; afterwards, with at least six months as a motorman, electrician, or machinist. After extra required training courses and evaluations by the ship’s captain one can begin the exams for a third assistant engineer license. The third method to achieve a license is an approved apprenticeship through an approved Coast Guard program, such as through a union such as the Marine Engineers Beneficial Association, or MEBA. Typically they take two years. Employers will often offer incentives to employees who wish to obtain their license, such as financial assistance or offering classes required to qualify for the exams. This method, as well as an apprenticeship is what is referred to as "hawsepiping".

== Uniform ==
Uniforms are still worn aboard many ships, especially aboard vessels that may require an officer to interact with passengers, and may differ between companies.

Often when reporting to a vessel the oncoming officer will report to the captain, or officer in charge of the vessel, in dress uniform. In the United States the uniform is in conjunction with Merchant Marine or Merchant Navy standards, depending on company policy. The Merchant Marine uniform distinguishes the First Engineer and the Chief Mate by a propeller on their shoulder boards, or epaulets. It is worn with the propeller closer to the neck and the stripes facing away from the neck, over the shoulders.

During day to day ship operations inside the engine room, engineers will usually wear a work uniform, such as a boiler suit. Often these are thick cotton or denim clothes that are more suited to an engineer's working conditions, but are often subject to company policy. Typically engineers change out of their work clothes in the mess hall to prevent getting oil or dirt from the engine room into the mess hall or galley.

== Employment ==
=== United States ===
As of May 2014, engineers aboard US flagged deep sea sailing vessels earned a mean salary of $47.67 an hour, or roughly $97,720. In 2014 marine engineers based in California had a mean wage of $111,080 per year. Approximately 8,300 marine engineering jobs are available in the United States with only the top 40 percent, mainly officers, making over $100,000 annually. The US Bureau of Labor Statistics anticipates a nine percent increase in jobs by 2024, translating to roughly 700 jobs. As of 2014 over 29% of marine engineers were over the age of 55, the highest percentage of any engineering occupation in the country over 55.

== See also ==
- Seafarer's professions and ranks
