= Oiler (occupation) =

Worker whose main job is to oil machinery

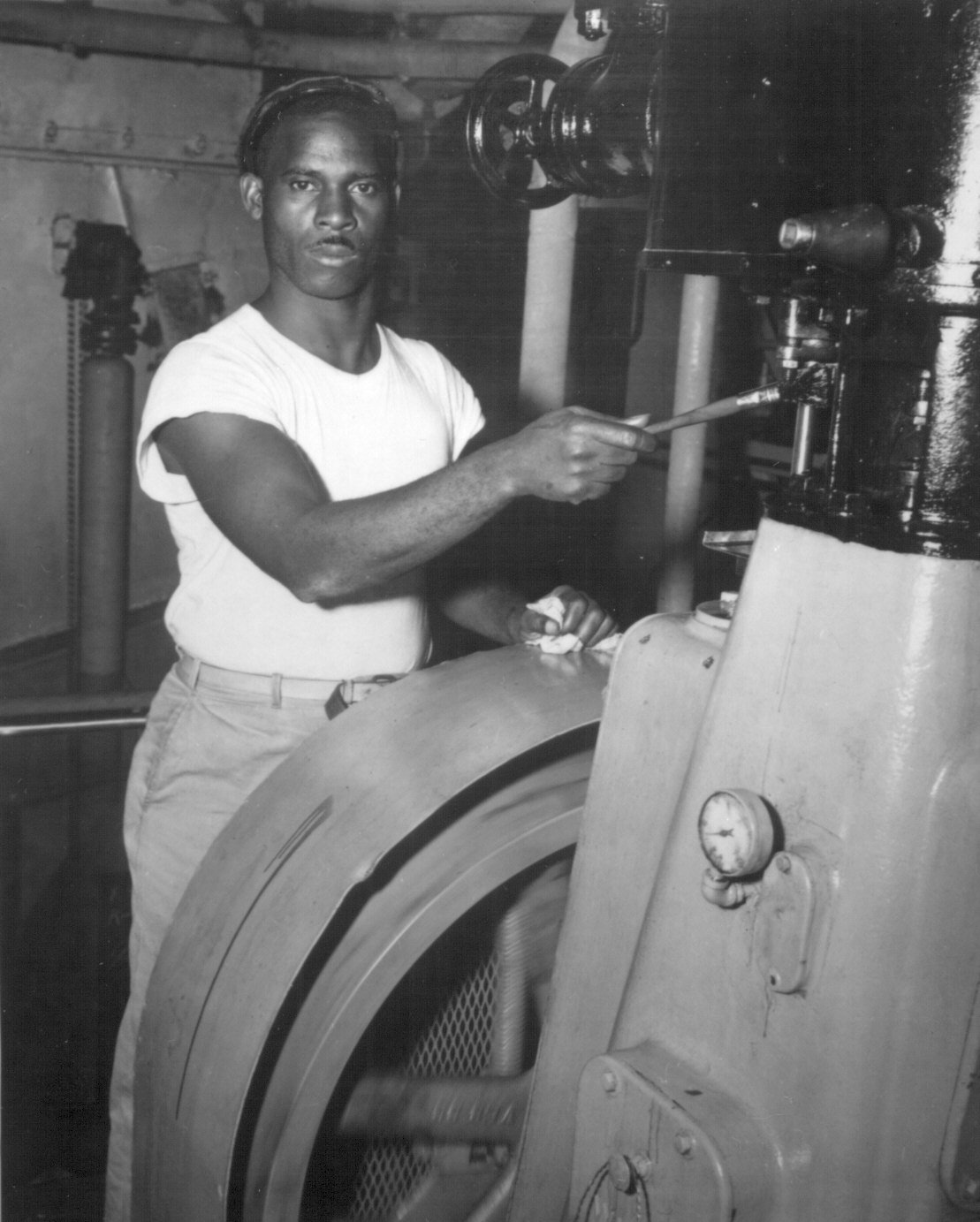
Arnold R. Fesser, oiler, 17 years at sea: "We got a big job to do until this war is won. We will keep them sailing until the end. Then we have got time for holidays." October 14, 1944.

An oiler (also known as a "greaser") is a worker whose main job is to oil machinery. In previous eras there were oiler positions in various industries, including maritime work (naval and commercial), railroading, steelmaking, and mining. Today most such positions have been eliminated through technological change; lubrication tends to require less human intervention, so that workers seldom have oiling as a principal duty. In the days of ubiquitous plain bearings, oiling was often a job description in and of itself.

Today, shipping is the economic segment that most thoroughly retains the notion of the oiler as a separate position. On a merchant ship, an oiler is an unlicensed rate of the engineering department. The position is of the junior rate in the engine room of a ship. The oiler is senior only to a wiper. Once a sufficient amount of sea time is acquired, the Oiler can apply to take a series of courses/examinations to become certified as an engineer.

As a member of the engineering department, the oiler operates and maintains the propulsion and other systems on board the vessel. Oilers also deal with the "hotel" facilities on board, notably the sewage, lighting, air conditioning, and water systems. They assist bulk fuel transfers and require training in firefighting and first aid. Moreover, oilers help facilitate operation of the ship's boats and other nautical tasks – especially with cargo loading/discharging gear and safety systems. However, the specific cargo discharge function remains the responsibility of deck officers and deck workers.

== Tools ==
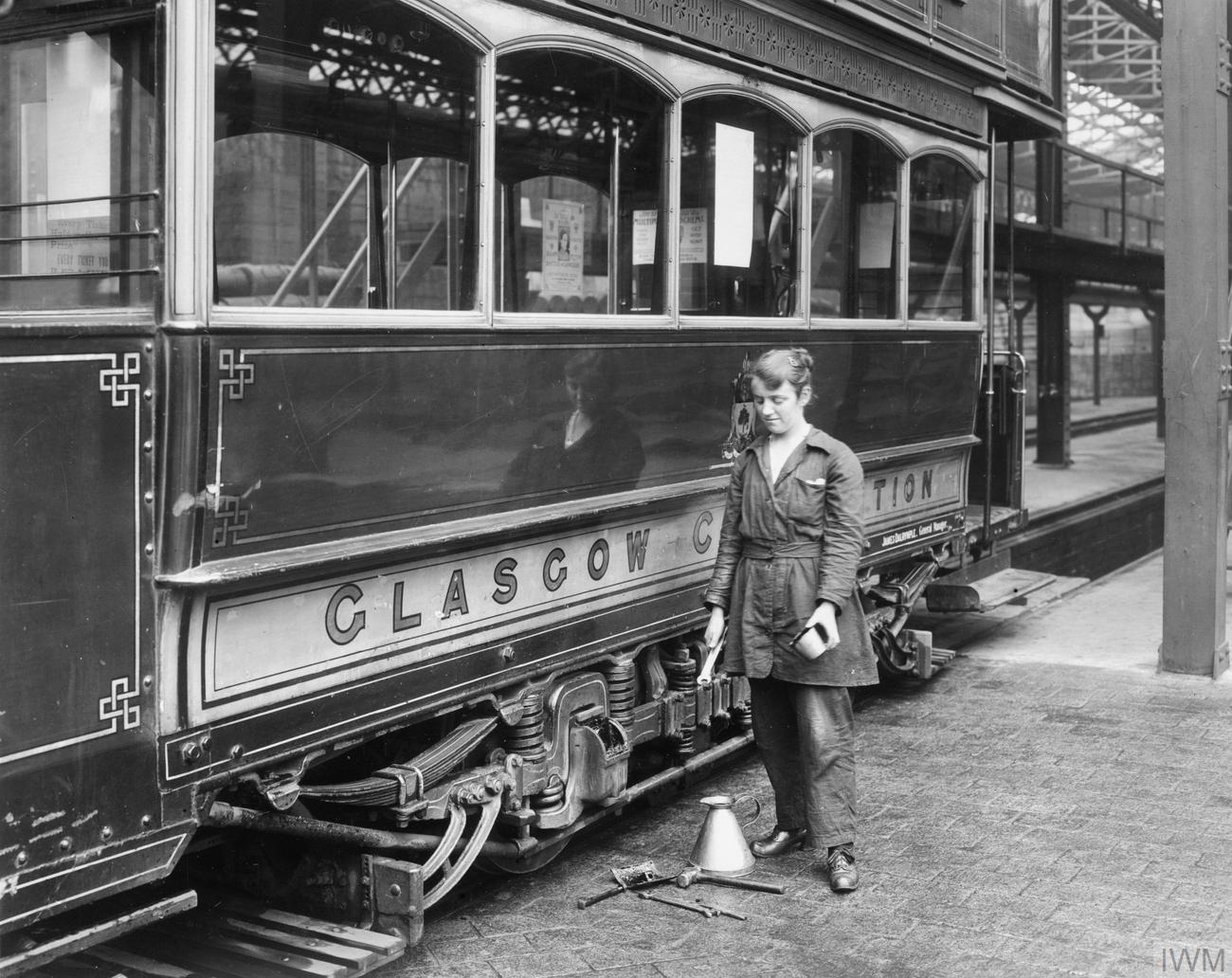
A greaser employed by Glasgow Corporation Tramways, with wrenches and an oil can (1918)

- Oil cans (which themselves are sometimes referred to as "oilers")
- Grease guns
- Rags and brushes

== Legal requirements ==
Under international conventions and agreements specifically the International Convention on Standards of Training, Certification and Watchkeeping for Seafarers (or STCW), all oilers who sail internationally are documented by their respective countries. Recent changes to the STCW no longer refer to specific rates such as oiler. The terms Able Seafarer-Engine and Able Seafarer-Deck are now used to refer to unlicensed positions on vessels engaged in international trade.

In the United States, Title 46 (Shipping) of the Code of Federal Regulations governs who is eligible to sail as an oiler in National trade.

=== United States ===
A person has to have a Merchant Mariner's Document issued by the United States Coast Guard in order to be employed as an oiler in the United States Merchant Marine.

=== Canada ===
To work as an oiler in the Canadian Coast Guard, it is required that the individual holds an engine room rating certificate. In order to obtain this certificate the applicant must first have no less than six months of documented sea time working under the supervision of a watch keeping engineer. The applicant must then go to a Transport Canada Office and have a written and oral exam before the certificate is issued. It is also required for all sea going personnel to have MED (marine emergency duty) certificates which can be obtained by taking courses through a college approved for training.

Oilers working for the Canadian Coast Guard have various duties, some of which include, performing regular maintenance of the ship's engines and other equipment, assisting the engineers with the repair and overhaul of the ship’s engines and equipment, making regular rounds of the engine room and designated spaces and alerting the engineer on watch of any problems noted. The oiler is also required to keep the engine room clean, tidy and freshly painted. They are the most junior crewmember of the engineering department in the Canadian Coast Guard.

== See also ==
- Seafarer's professions and ranks
- Engine room
- Engineering department
- Motorman (ship)
- Ring oiler
- Wiper (occupation)
