= Third engineer =

Shipboard occupation

General
- Other names: Second assistant engineer
- Department: Engineering Department
- Reports to: Chief engineer, second engineer
- Licensed: Yes
- Duties: daily maintenance and operation in the engine department
- Requirements: Sea Time on Previous License, Professional Training.

Watchstanding
- Watchstander: Depends on manned or unmanned engine room
- Watch (at sea): Varies (0000-0400, 1200-1600)
- Watch (in port): Varies (0000-0800)

A third engineer or second assistant engineer is a rank of engine officer who is part of the engine department on a ship.

The third engineer is usually in charge of boilers, auxiliary engines, condensate and feed systems, record keeping of chemicals onboard, lube oil tests, and is the third most senior engine officer on board.

The exact duties of this position will often depend upon the type of ship and arrangement of the engine department. On ships with steam propulsion plants the Second or Third is in charge of the boilers, combustion control, soot blowers, condensate and feed equipment, feed pumps, fuel, and condensers. On diesel and gas turbine propulsion plants the Third is in charge of auxiliary boilers, auxiliary engines.

== Notable Second assistant engineers ==
- Raymond McKay
- Paul Hall (labor leader)
