= French rescue ship Argonaute (2004) =

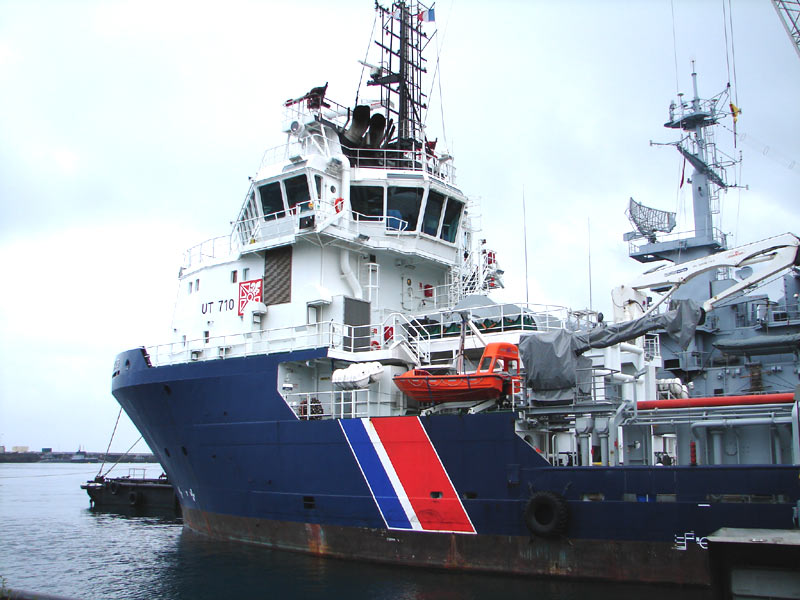

History

Norway
- Name: Island Patriot
- Ordered: 1 January 2001
- Builder: Brevik Construction, Brevik, Norway
- Launched: 2003
- Commissioned: December 2003

France
- Name: Argonaute
- Namesake: Argonauts
- Acquired: 2004
- Identification: IMO number: 9269518; MMSI number: 228186700; Callsign: FMAA

General characteristics
- Class & type: UT 710 High sea tug
- Displacement: 2100 tonnes
- Length: 68.95 m (226.2 ft)
- Beam: 15.5 m (51 ft)
- Draught: 5.95 m (19.5 ft)
- Propulsion: 2 Bergen BRM9 diesel engines
- Speed: 15.6 knots (28.9 km/h; 18.0 mph)
- Complement: 9
- Sensors & processing systems: 2 Racal Decca radars

Argonaute is a ship of the French Navy specialised in rescue and decontamination.

Argonaute is equipped for the NATO Submarine Rescue System.

== Sources and references ==
- Bâtiment de soutien, d'assistance et de dépollution Argonaute, netmarine.net
