= Engine department =

Organizational unit aboard a ship

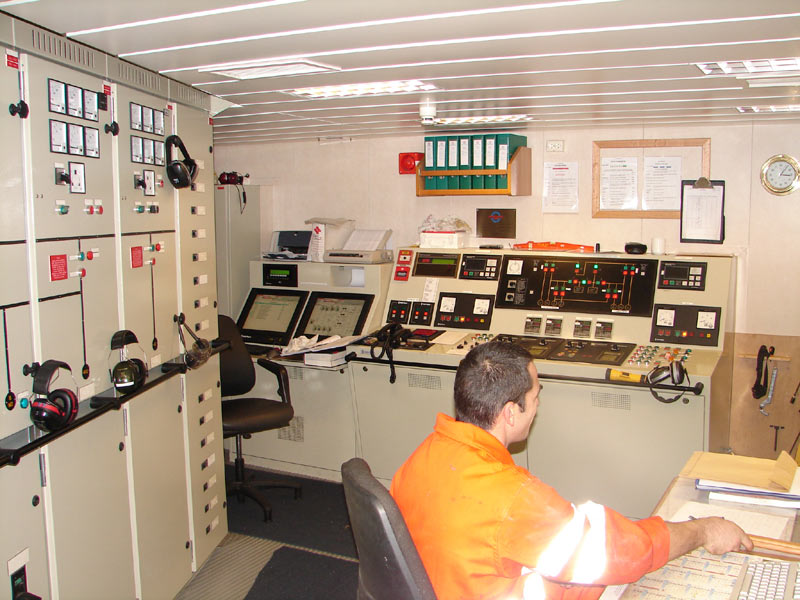
The engine control room on the Argonaute.

An engine department or engineering department is an organizational unit aboard a ship that is responsible for the operation, maintenance, and repair of the propulsion systems and the support systems for crew, passengers, and cargo. These include the ship engine, fuel oil, lubrication, water distillation, separation process, lighting, air conditioning, and refrigeration.

== History ==
The engine department emerged with the arrival of marine engines for propulsion, largely during the later half of the 19th century. Due to advances in marine technology during the 20th century, the engine department aboard merchant ships is considered equally important as the deck department, since trained engine officers are required to handle the machinery on a ship.

The engine department takes care of the engine room aboard a ship. Rotations vary depending on the vessel or company. Whoever is on a rotation has to stand watch to look over the engine and its components. There are different crew members for watch rotation.

== Staffing ==
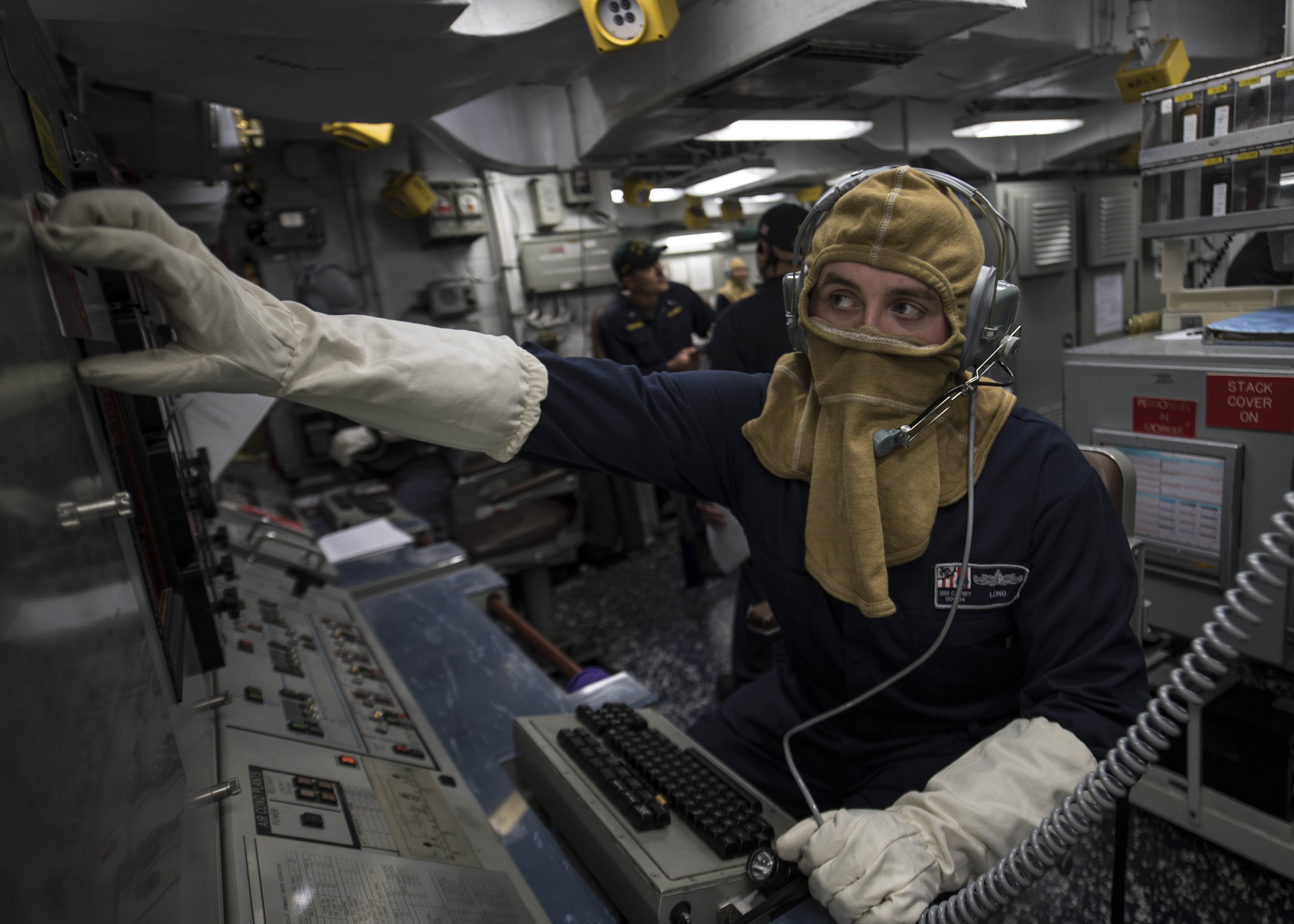
Watch Standing Mate.

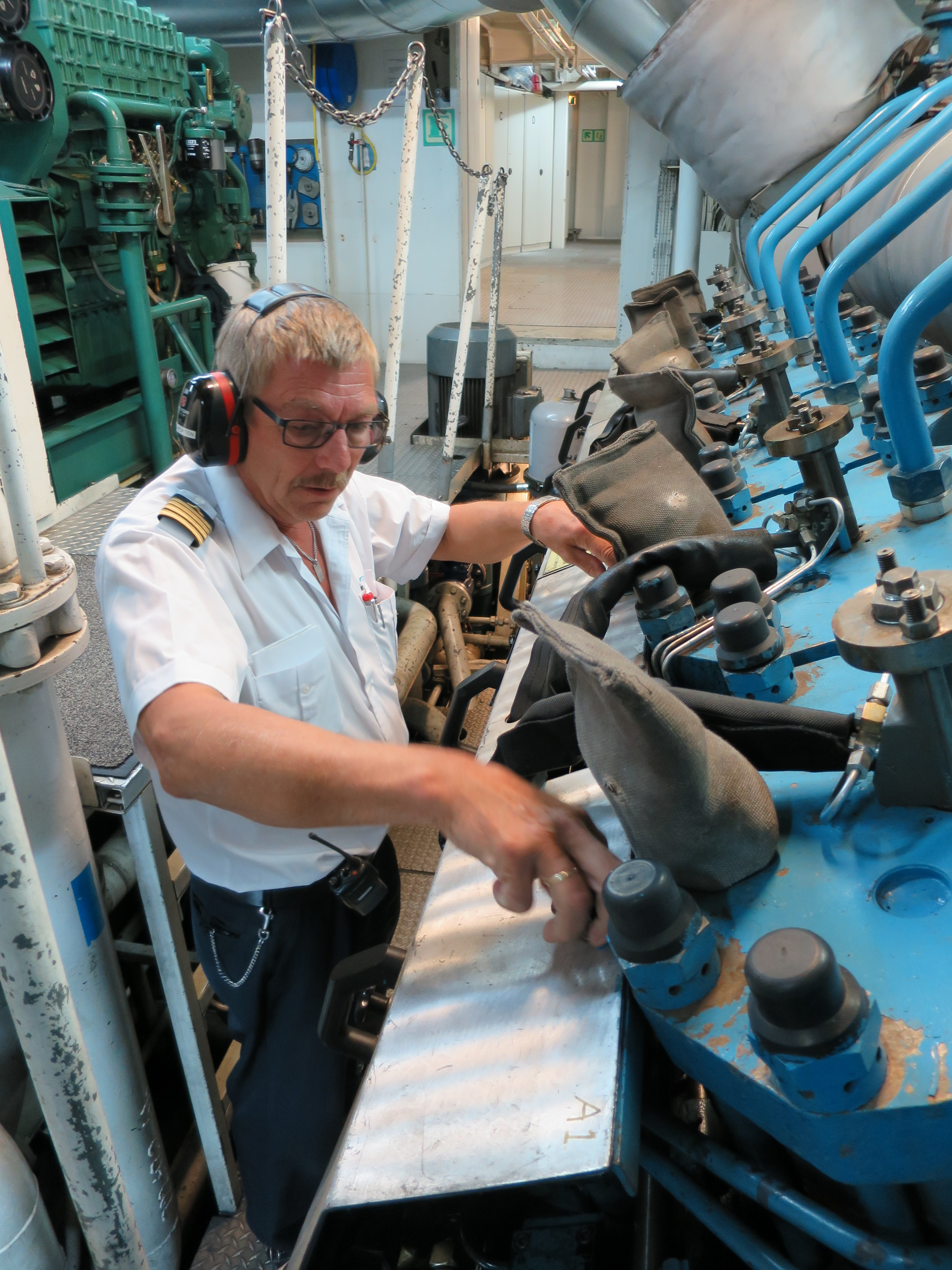
Watch officer (chief engineer) working.

Typically, a ship's engine department is run by the engine officers but staffed with other occupational specialties of the seafarer's trade like:

- Machinist/Fitter: A rating (or petty officer) who is specialized in fabrication, welding, etc.
- Motorman: A, not always, qualified engine rating who stands a watch with the engine officer, as well as performing routine tasks and assisting engine officers during maintenance.
- Oiler: A rating who is responsible for ensuring that machinery is adequately lubricated. Performs menial tasks such as cleaning, sounding tanks etc.
- Wiper: The lowest rating in the engine room and is tasked with keeping the machinery spaces clean and tidy. Wipers usually go on to become oilers once they are familiar with engine room machinery and specific routines.

== Requirements ==
In order to be a watch officer and have the license for it, there are 3 basic requirements and they are age, seagoing service, and education/training on stcw's. Some basic USCG stcw requirements go further into seagoing service, approved trainings such as; engine resource management, gas/steam turbine plants, control systems, etc., and finally the competencies which include "Evidence of Standard of competence".

Defunct positions within the engine department include the fireman, who was a rating responsible for shoveling coal into the boiler furnaces of steam engines, and the coal trimmer, a rating that loaded coal in the bunkers and transported the coal from the bunkers to the firemen.

== Modern times ==
Nowadays, due to the increase in automation on merchant vessels, and the increase in the unattended machinery spaces (UMS) aboard them, the number of seafaring engine officers has decreased drastically on board merchant ships. Today, the engine department usually consists of the following number of engine officers and ratings:

- (1) Chief engineer
- (1) Second engineer
- (1) Third engineer
- (1-2) Fourth engineer
- (0-1) Engine Cadet
- (2-4) Motorman
- (0-2) Oiler
- (0-1) Wiper

Additionally, many vessels also carry a specific type of engine officer known as an electro-technical officer.

== See also ==
- Engine officer
- Engine room
- List of maritime colleges
- Marine fuel management
- Seafarer's professions and ranks
- Society of Naval Architects and Marine Engineers
