= Electro-technical officer =

Position in the technical hierarchy of merchant ships

The Electro-Technical Officer (ETO) is a licensed member of the engine department of a merchant ship as per Section A-III/6 of the STCW Code.

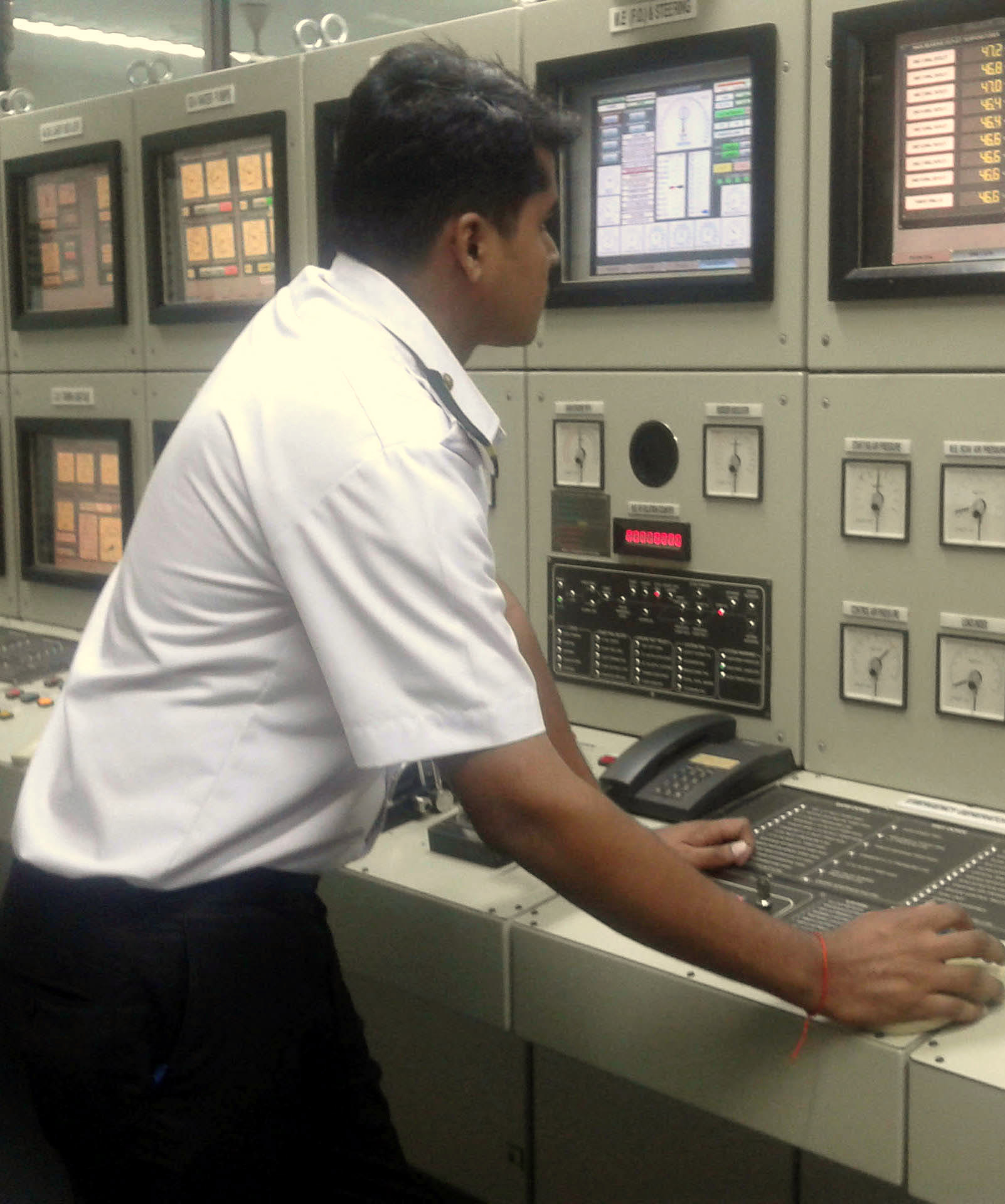
An ETO monitoring sensors and alarm systems

The Marine Electrical Engineer is a vital positions in the technical hierarchy of a ship and is constrained by their assigned work under the Chief Engineer's overview. An ETO manages a key role in the Senior Management Team and reports directly to the Chief Engineer.

An ETO does not carry out an assigned Engine room "watch" instead they are normally on call 24 hours a day and generally work a daily shift carrying out electrical and electronic maintenance, repairs, diagnosis, installations and testing.

Some shipping companies do not carry Electrical Engineer Officers/ETOs on their ship to cut down the manning cost, and the electrical duties are instead carried out by a Marine Engineer - usually the Third Engineer. In many companies this situation has changed a lot, as many have realized that modern electrical and electronic systems require an extra attention and therefore require an expert to attend them. This is especially true on diesel-electric ships or vessels equipped with sophisticated systems such as dynamic positioning.

The International Maritime Organisation (IMO) amended STCW 95 (also known as the Manila Amendment) on June 25, 2010, to introduce the certified position of Electro-technical officer in place of Electrical officers. This was enacted to make modern Electrical Engineers competent to understand the more complex and sophisticated electrical systems that are emerging.

On larger vessels such as cruise ships or specialized offshore DP vessels, Electro-Technical Officers can have ranks within their profession, such position names include, lead ETO, First Electrician, chief electrical officer or chief electrical engineer. In this situation, the highest ranked Electro Technical officer will report directly to the chief engineer. On special class ships such as FPSOs the Electro Technical officer can earn high incomes due to the complexity of systems on board. This person is generally expected to have additional qualifications which specialise in process engineering, instrumentation and control.

== See also ==
- Engine department (ship)
- Engine room
- List of maritime colleges
- Marine engineering
- Seafarer's professions and ranks
