= Engine officer =

Licensed mariner responsible for propulsion plants and support systems

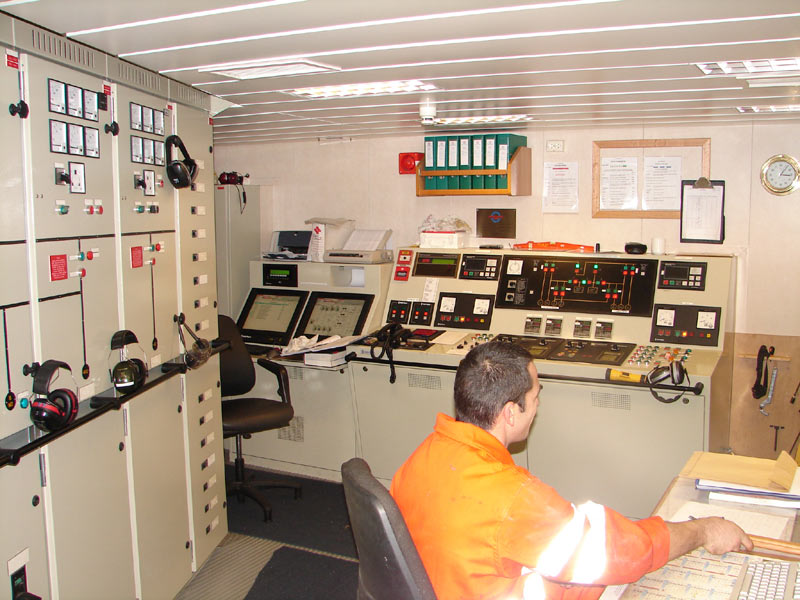
The engine control room on the Argonaute, a French supply vessel, mainly used for anti-pollution missions along with the tugboat Abeille Bourbon. It has been built in 2003 in Norway, is based in Brest, belongs to SURF and is used by the French Navy.

An engine officer or simply engineer, is a licensed mariner qualified and responsible for operating and maintaining the propulsion plants and support systems for a watercraft and its crew, passengers and cargo. Engineering officers are usually educated and qualified as engineering technicians.

Ship engineers are responsible for propulsion and other ship systems such as: electrical power generation plant; steam boilers; lighting; fuel oil; lubrication; water distillation and separation; air conditioning; refrigeration; sewage treatment and water systems on board the vessel. They require knowledge and hands-on experience with electric power, electronics, pneumatics, hydraulics, chemistry, steam generation, gas turbines and even nuclear technology on certain military and civilian vessels.

== Ranks and titles ==
There are several types and ranks of engine officer that are employed in the engine department of a ship

=== Watchstanding officers ===
- Chief engineer:Chief engineer is the highest rank one can achieve as an engine officer. The chief engineer is one of the most senior rank onboard the vessel who shares rank equivalent to the captain of the ship.
- Second engineer: In charge of the day-to-day running of the engine department. Often in charge of main engine maintenance. Takes the 4–8 watch. Shares rank equivalent to chief officer.
- Third engineer: Usually in charge auxiliary engines & boilers. Takes the 12–4 watch. Shares rank equivalent to 2nd officer
- Fourth engineer: Usually in charge of air compressors, purifiers, pumps and other auxiliary machinery. Takes the 8–12 watch. Sometimes in charge of boilers. Share rank equivalent to 3rd officer

=== Electrical officers ===
Electrical officers do not participate in watchstanding of the engine department, but are present on more sophisticated vessels to take charge of electronic and electrical equipment

- Electro-technical officer (ETO): Officer who is responsible for the maintenance of electronic equipment including automation systems and instrumentation process and control equipment, and/or general electrical equipment. Reports to Chief Engineer.
- Electrical officer: Officer who is responsible for the maintenance of general electrical equipment such as motors, transformers, lights, reefer outlets etc. Reports to ETO / Chief Engineer.

=== Other positions ===
- Junior engineer: Officer who is qualified as fourth engineer but lacks the experience to take a watch. Assists with all engine department duties.
- Engine/ETO cadet: A trainee engine officer or ETO. Understudies the other engine department personnel. Cadets of most countries are sponsored during training by a shipping company, serving their time on board ships owned by that company. Many go on to work as engine officers with their sponsoring company once training is complete.

== United States naval use ==
United States Navy ships have a varying number of engine officers, depending upon the size of the crew, occupying positions named for subsidiary responsibilities of the Engineering Officer. The two highest ranking subordinates are usually the Main Propulsion Assistant (MPA), responsible for operation and maintenance of propulsion machinery, and the Damage Control Assistant (DCA), responsible for prevention and control of damage. Anticipation of battle damage increases the significance of responsibilities of the latter position on warships. A DCA often stands routine deck or engineering watches, but spends his off-watch time overseeing maintenance of watertight integrity and firefighting equipment. A DCA's battle station normally includes responsibility for controlling the ship's stability, list and trim by flooding and dewatering undamaged compartments as necessary to prevent capsizing. Additional engine officers may include an Electrical Officer, responsible for the ship's electrical generating and distribution system as described above, and an Auxiliaries (or A Division) Officer, responsible for pumps, ventilation blowers, refrigeration compressors, and windlass machinery as described above for the Fourth Engineer.

== See also ==
- Engine department – Organizational unit aboard a ship
- Engine room – Space where the propulsion machinery is installed aboard a ship
- Marine engineering – Engineering and design of shipboard systems
- Marine fuel management
- Seafarer's professions and ranks – Overview of marine occupations
