= Chief engineer =

Most senior engineer in an organisation

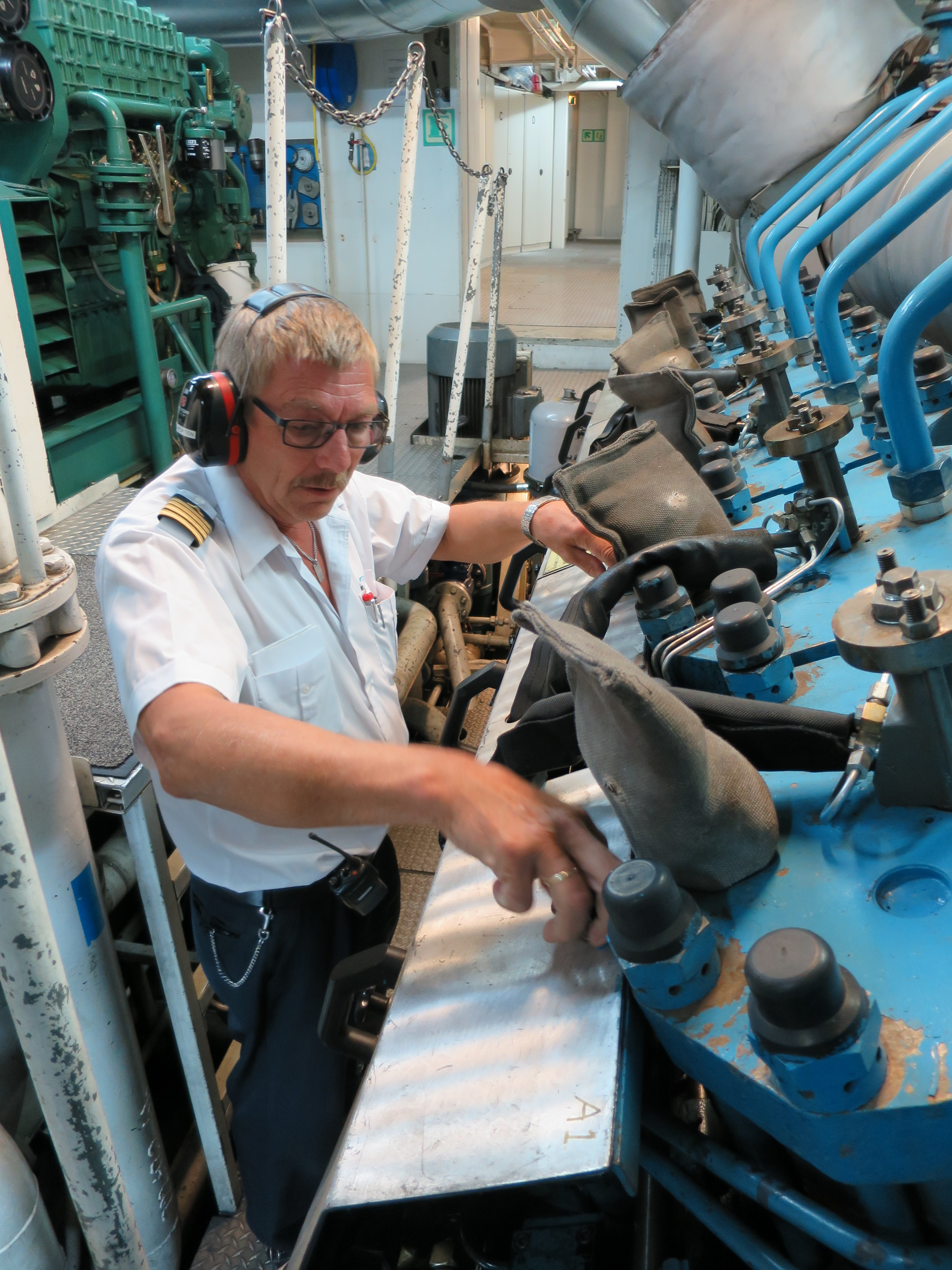
Chief engineer in the engine room, for the first time ever, of MF Bastø II, a Norwegian ferry

A chief engineer, commonly referred to as "Chief" or "ChEng", is the most senior licensed mariner (engine officer) of an engine department on a ship, typically a merchant ship, and holds overall leadership and the responsibility of that department. In rank, a chief engineer is equivalent to the rank of a ship's captain. A chief engineer has a strong technical expertise and therefore they have numerous shore jobs opportunities and are not just bounded to sail. They can become technical superintendents, fleet managers, surveyors, ship builders etc. As a person who holds one of the most senior roles on the ship, they must have excellent communication and leadership skills. They are expected to regularly work alongside other crew members and external consultants, and most importantly, provide guidance to their team.

To be a chief engineer, an engineer must attain a chief engineer's license appropriate to the tonnage, power rating, and type of ship the engineer is employed on. A chief engineer is ultimately responsible for all operations and maintenance that has to do with any and all engineering equipment throughout the entire ship, and supervises all other engineering officer and engine ratings within the department.

== United Kingdom ==
In the UK, chief engineers are under MSN 1857 (M+F) - UK Requirements for Engineer Officers and Engineer Operators. Chief engineers may be rated as Unlimited or for ships Less than 3,000 kW.

To become a chief engineer in the UK, engineers must have either:

- 36 months’ seagoing service as an EOOW. A minimum of 18 months of this seagoing service must have been on vessels of at least 3000 kW, in charge of the watch or with designated UMS duties and the remainder on vessels of at least 750 kW.
- 12 months’ seagoing service as a Second Engineer III/2, OR Chief Engineer III/2, on vessels of less than 9000 kW.

== United States ==
=== Job requirements ===
- A Chief Engineer must be a United States citizen of at least 18 years of age.
- A Chief Engineer must have at least one year of experience as a First Assistant Engineer
- A Chief Engineer must have a United States Coast Guard endorsed license

=== Job description ===
- A Chief Engineer must be able to stand watches regularly when the ship is at sea or in port. A chief remains on call at all times
- The Chief Engineer plans, directs and performs as necessary, the activities of the Engineering Department in carrying out its assigned functions and responsibilities.
- A Chief Engineer supervises fellow department personnel while providing job training and guidance as necessary.
- A Chief Engineer must ensure each assigned task is completed, and keep required records and log entries.
- A Chief Engineer must ensure the mission of the ship can be successfully completed by supervising or personally performing particularly complex or difficult technical work and activities.
- A Chief Engineer must assume a leadership role for the rest of the crew and give orders or suggestions when needed.
- A Chief Engineer salary can vary depending on the particular job. Salary level ranges from $90,000 to $268,000 in the United States.

=== Designed courses for potential chief engineers ===
Courses for potential Chief Engineers are designed by experienced engineers who had spent years in the field of engineering already, "To determine the topics that should be included in the certificate, the team undertook an analysis of existing company training materials that were being used for training their senior level project and systems engineers."

A similar training program for potential Chief Engineers, the Certified Chief Engineer (CCE) Training is also being developed by the National Association of Hotel & Lodging Engineers. The development process of CCE includes gathering the input of various hotel management companies and industry professions. CCE program is designed to provide a curriculum exclusively for hotel engineers and maintenance professionals.

== Notable representatives ==
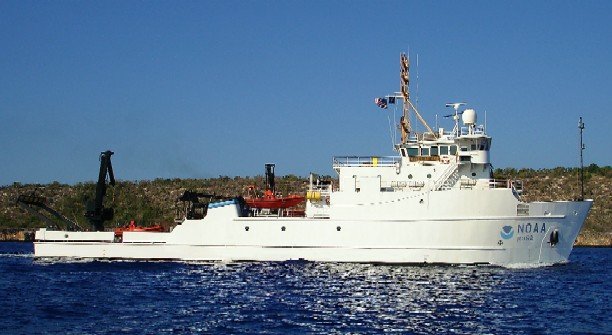
NOAA Ship, Nancy Foster

Oscar Kjellberg, a Swedish chief engineer who later became an inventor.

Joseph Bell, a British chief engineer who served as first chief engineer of Olympic, and subsequently RMS Titanic; he died in Titanic's sinking.

Patrick K. Brown: A US Coast Guard Licensed Chief Engineer, who was associated with discharging waste oil directly overboard. As a result, Chief Engineer Brown faced up to five years of prison time, a potential fine, and a term of probation up to five years.

Tim Olsen: A U.S. Coast Guard Licensed Chief Engineer, who sailed on NOAA Ship Nancy Foster, an oceanographic research vessel that became the first U.S. Government ship to visit Cuba since the reestablishment of diplomatic relations.

== See also ==
- Seafarer's professions and ranks
