= Sailor =

Person who navigates water-borne vessels or assists in doing so

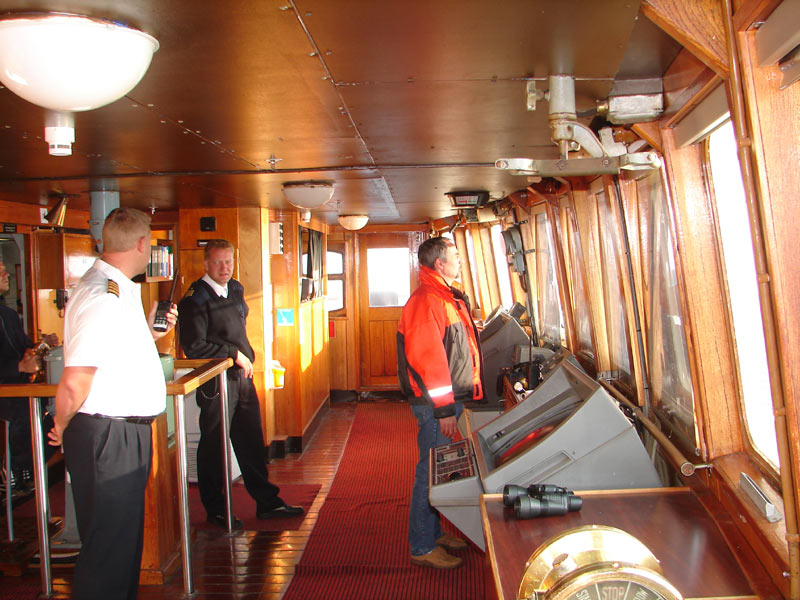
- Three types of mariners, seen here in the wheelhouse of a ship: a master, able seaman, and harbour pilot.

Occupation
- Occupation type: Profession
- Activity sectors: Military and civilian

Description
- Competencies: Physical; Stamina; Mindset
- Fields of employment: Navy, Coast Guard, civilian companies and organizations
- Related jobs: Maritime

A sailor, seaman, mariner, or seafarer is a person who works aboard a watercraft as part of its crew, and may work in any one of a number of different fields that are related to the operation and maintenance of a ship. While the term sailor has its etymological roots from sailing, that is a time when sailing ships were the main mode of transport at sea, it now refers to the personnel of all watercraft regardless of the type of vessel, boat or ship. It encompasses people who operate ships professionally, be it for a military (navy) or civilian (merchant navy) or for sports or recreation. In a navy, there may be further distinctions: sailor may refer to any member of the navy even if they are based on land, while seaman may refer to a specific enlisted rank. Additionally, fisherman are seen as a distinct type of sailor, that is those engaged in fishing.

Sailors have existed from the earliest periods in history as people used boats for purposes such as maritime transport. Professional sailors normally undertake training or other forms of education to develop their skills. Professional sailors are also governed by regulations, including the STCW Convention.

== History ==
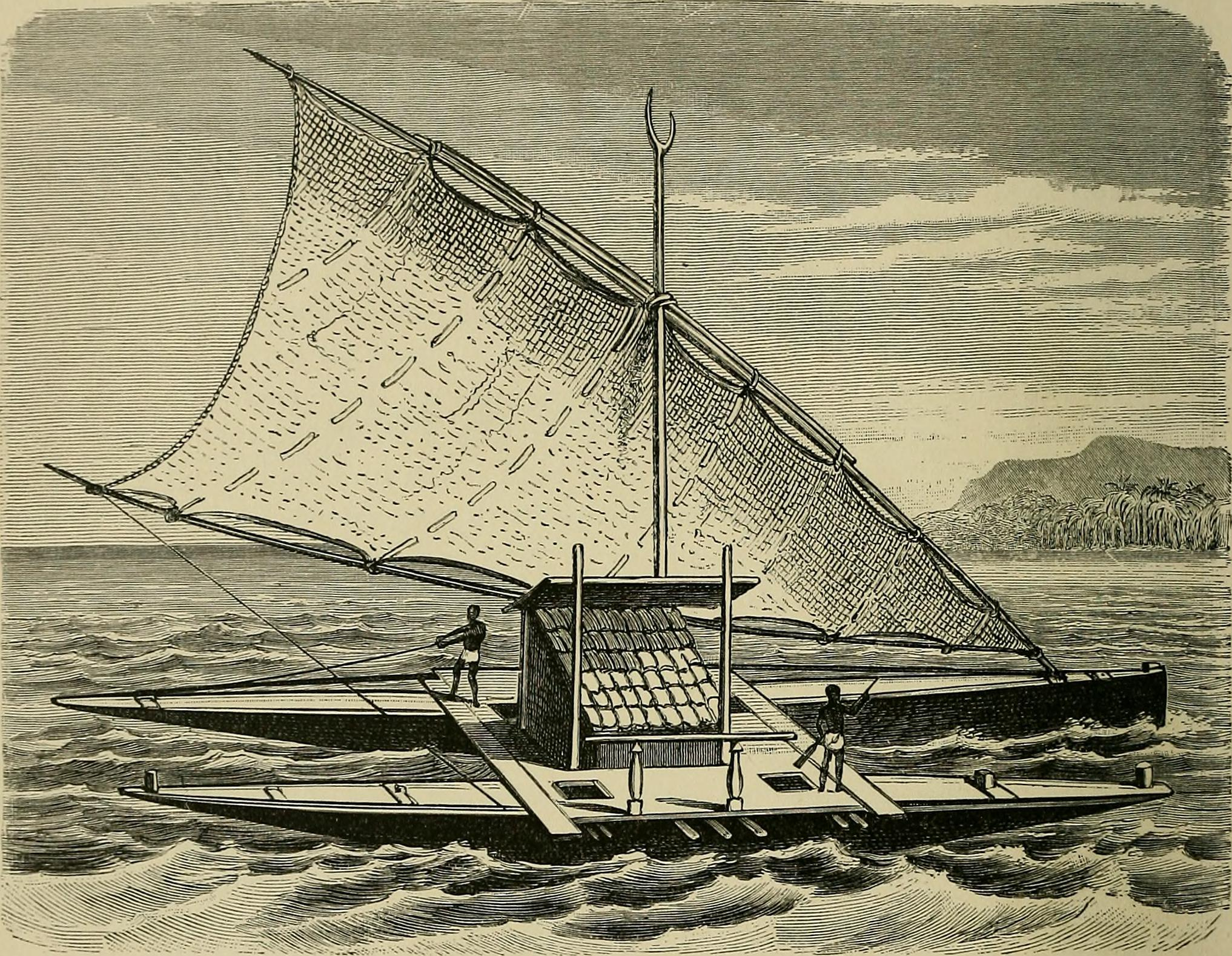
Artwork published in 1896 from The History of Mankind, which depicts a drua.

Polynesian navigators would sail to several islands east of New Guinea by 1500 BCE. Voyages would eventually be travelled across the Polynesian triangle. This extensive wayfinding was conducted through the use of specialized watercraft, observing stars, and awareness of other natural phenomena.

There was Norse colonization of the Americas. After Erik the Red was exiled in Iceland, he sailed to Greenland and formed a settlement there. His son Leif Erikson would explore the east coast of North America around 1000 CE, naming areas Helluland, Markland, and Vinland. Thorfinn Karlsefni would later settle briefly near the areas explored by Erikson and have a son there before deciding to return to Iceland.

Ferdinand Magellan led the first expedition that circumnavigated the globe in 1519–1522.

== Skills ==
A knowledge and understanding of seamanship is a key component of being a sailor, typically seen as a requisite for safety and efficient working at sea. While the level of knowledge will vary by the ship type and sailor, areas of knowledge include operational practices such as navigation, anchoring and other nautical operations. Sailors usually have an awareness of basic meteorology including the need to monitor the weather at sea. Passage planning, maintenance of machinery and/or rigging/sails is also necessary, depending on the type of vessel.

Working at sea safely also requires adequate clothing (especially when working outside on a vessel) or PPE depending on the job.

An important skill as a sailor when working with others (a crew) is effective communication.

== Working conditions ==
Standard merchant watch system
	Day 1	Day 2	Day 3
4 am – 8 am	Team 1	Team 1	Team 1
8 am – 12 pm	Team 2	Team 2	Team 2
12 pm – 4 pm	Team 3	Team 3	Team 3
4 pm – 8 pm	Team 1	Team 1	Team 1
8 pm – 12 am	Team 2	Team 2	Team 2
12 am – 4 am	Team 3	Team 3	Team 3

Working conditions vary according to the nature of the sailor's employment. Whilst sailors may be employed on a vessel for extended periods of time, it is often not the case that sailors will spend the entirety of that period sailing since ships are often docked at a port for a significant period. Mariners spend extended periods at sea. Most deep-sea mariners are hired for one or more voyages that last for several months. The length of time between voyages varies by job availability and personal preference.

There are specific challenges to work-life balance as a seafarer due to the nature of employment itself, such as the physical distance between one's job and home. Another challenge facing sailors on international voyages is the adjustment to time zones as the ship sails through various oceans. An adopted solution is to gradually adjust the timings of the ship which often leads to wake-up times being adjusted periodically. Sampson further notes that ships often have a 'dry ship' or 'no alcohol' policy which prohibits even the possession of alcohol with 'random testing' taking place 'fairly regularly'. Seafarers typically live on board their ships and may find this experience to be isolating and lonely. Seafarers are at a greater risk of suicide compared to other occupations.

Internet accessibility has been possible with the advent of satellite communication, mainly from providers such as Inmarsat, Iridium and Starlink. The availability of affordable roaming SIM cards with online top-up facilities have also contributed to improved connection with friends and family. As internet data has become cheaper, seafarers have gained better connectivity, however they are often charged for using data. In 2022, the right to internet access for sailors was adopted in the Maritime Labour Convention although shipowners can charge sailors for this service.

Merchant sailors may belong to a trade union to allow for collective bargaining of wages and other employment benefits. In the US, the rate of unionization for these workers is about 36 percent, much higher than the average for all occupations. US merchant marine officers and seamen, both veterans and beginners, are hired for voyages through union hiring halls. Hiring halls fill jobs by the length of time the person has been registered at the hall and by their union seniority. Hiring halls typically are found in major seaports in the US. However, merchant sailors can also be hired by direct employment with a shipowner or crewing agency. Filipino seamen typically gain employment at sea through a seafarers pool (agency). Regardless of the contract of employment (union, shipowner, agency) since 2013 merchant sailors should now be given a seafarer's employment agreement under the Maritime Labour Convention that sets out basic employment terms and remuneration.

== Professional mariners ==
Seafarers hold a variety of professions and ranks. Minimum international standards for merchant vessels are regulated by the STCW Convention. Certifications regarding safety and basic firefighting must be renewed every five years. The Maritime Labour Convention regulates other standards surrounding maritime employment in the 96 countries that have ratified it such as accommodations and payment of wages. As of 2021, an estimated 1.28% of workers in the maritime industry were women.

=== Deck department ===
An able seaman stands iceberg lookout on the bow of the freighter USNS Southern Cross during a re-supply mission to McMurdo Station, Antarctica; c. 1981.

Officer positions in the deck department include but are not limited to: master and his chief, second and third officers. The official classifications for unlicensed members of the deck department are able seaman and ordinary seaman. With some variation, the chief mate is most often charged with the duties of cargo mate. Second Mates are charged with being the medical officer in case of a medical emergency. All three mates each do four-hour morning and afternoon shifts on the bridge, when underway at sea.

A common deck crew for a large merchant ship includes:

- (1) Captain (Master)
- (1) Chief Officer (First Mate)
- (1) Second Officer (Second Mate)
- (1) Third Officer (Third Mate)
- (1) Boatswain (unlicensed Petty Officer: Qualified member Deck Dept.)
- (2) Able seamen (unlicensed qualified rating)
- (2) Ordinary seamen (entry-level rating)
- (0-1) Deck cadet / unlicensed trainee navigator / Midshipman

=== Engineering department ===
A ship's engineering department consists of the members of a ship's crew that operates and maintains the propulsion, machinery and other systems on board the vessel. Marine engineering staff also deal with the "hotel" facilities on board, notably the sewage, lighting, air conditioning and water systems. Engineering staff manages bulk fuel transfers, from a fuel-supply barge in port. When underway at sea, the second and third engineers will often be occupied with oil transfers from storage tanks, to active working tanks. Cleaning of oil purifiers is another regular task. Engineering staff is required to have training in firefighting and first aid. Additional duties include maintaining the ship's boats and performing other nautical tasks. Engineers play a key role in cargo loading/discharging gear and safety systems, though the specific cargo discharge function remains the responsibility of deck officers and deck workers.

The engineering department will vary according to the type and size of the ship. The engineering crew for a large merchant ship typically includes:

- 1 Chief Engineer
- 1 Second Engineer (First Assistant Engineer)
- 1 Third Engineer (Second Assistant Engineer)
- 1 Fourth Engineer / Third Assistant Engineer)
- 1 Motorman (unlicensed Junior Engineer: Qualified member Engine Dept. Note that US ships carry a qualified member of the engine department.)
- 1 or more Oilers (unlicensed qualified rating)
- 1 or more Entry-level rating Wipers.

Merchant ships will also typically train and have onboard one or more Engine Cadets (unlicensed Trainee engineer). Other possible positions include fitter, machinist, electrician, refrigeration engineer and tankerman. Electricians on merchant ships are known as Electro-technical officers (ETO). They have separate training, education and licensing requirements.

=== Steward's department ===
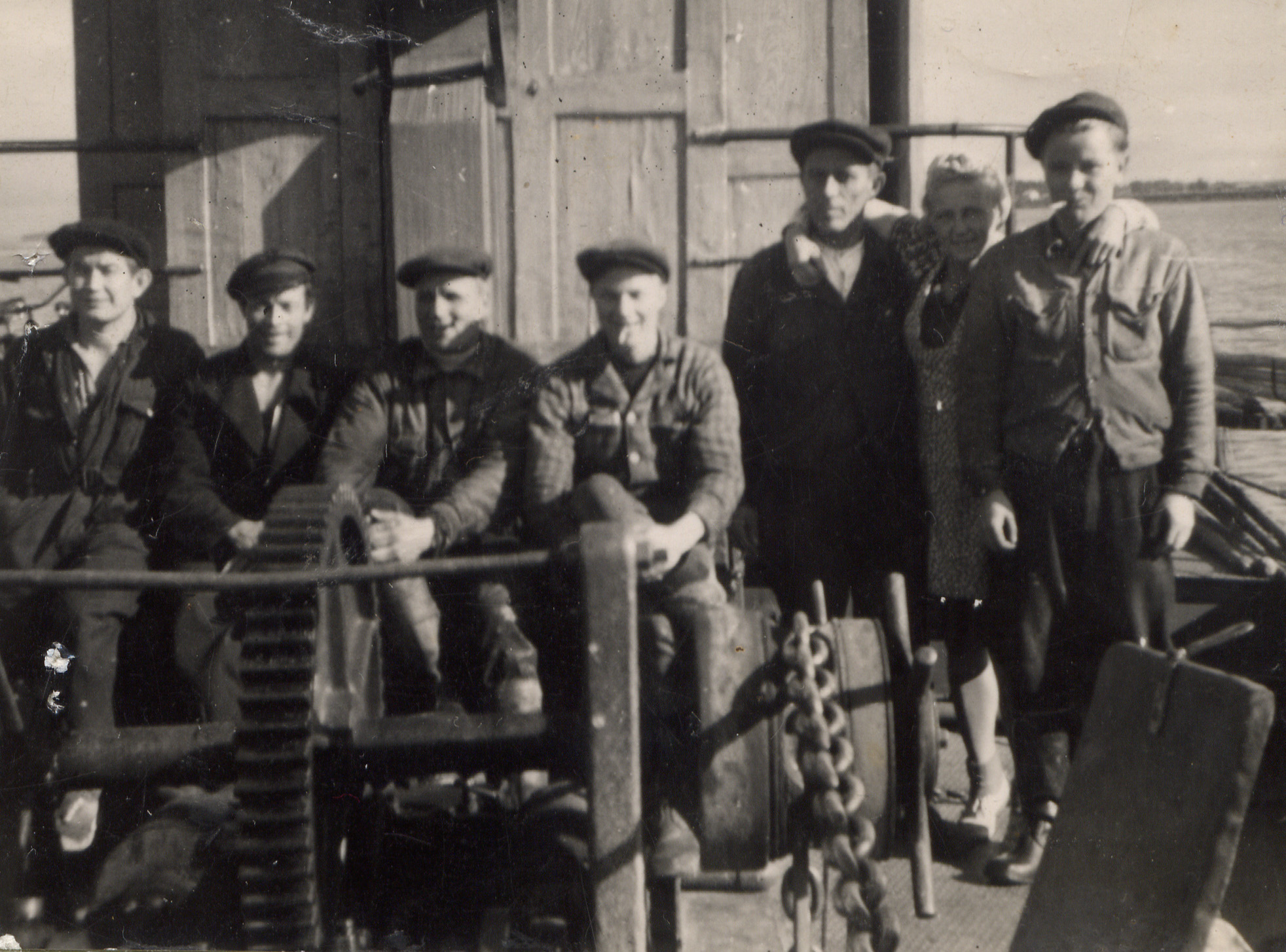
A crew with a cook on the Finnish steamboat S/S Kajaani I in 1953

A typical steward's department for a merchant ship consists of a chief steward and a chief cook. Some ships may also have a steward's assistant or additional persons for ships with a large volume of persons onboard.

The chief steward directs, instructs, and assigns personnel performing such functions as preparing and serving meals; cleaning and maintaining officers' quarters and steward department areas; and receiving, issuing, and inventorying stores. The chief steward also plans menus, compiles supply, overtime, and cost control records. The steward may requisition or purchase stores and equipment. Galley's roles may include baking. A chief steward's duties may overlap with those of the steward's assistant, the chief cook, and other Steward's department crewmembers.

A chief steward in the United States Merchant Marine must have a Merchant Mariner's Document issued by the United States Coast Guard and have taken an approved food management course. All cooks who sail internationally are similarly documented by their respective countries because of international conventions and agreements, specifically a requirement for a Ship's Cook Certificate of Competency under the Maritime Labour Convention.

Typically, the only time that steward department staff are charged with duties outside the steward department is during emergencies and training such as fire/boat drills.

=== Other departments ===
Various types of staff officer positions may exist on board a ship, including junior assistant purser, senior assistant purser, purser, chief purser, medical doctor, professional nurse, marine physician assistant, and hospital corpsman. In the USA these jobs are considered administrative positions and are therefore regulated by Certificates of Registry issued by the United States Coast Guard.

Maritime pilots are also licensed seafarers that have additional knowledge, training and experience in sailing local waterways, ports and harbours. Sailors who become pilots typically have to undertake a pilotage exam to demonstrate their knowledge of local waters and their shiphandling experience.

== Training, organisations and regulation ==
The rules and regulations that apply to sailors vary by country and depend on the type of waterborne craft. Some countries do not require sailors to possess a licence and/or training to operate a small and/or basic boat where as some require a basic safety certificate. However, for larger sailing boats and for some recreational sailors, national governing bodies will set out training and licensing requirements, an example being the RYA in the UK. The International Certificate of Competence (ICC) is the approved form of international sailing licence for recreational (pleasure craft) sailors, as set by the UNECE. However, for professional sailors, requirements are set out by various national and international authorities. Sailors in a navy will undertake military and seafarer training, typically in a naval academy. For merchant seafarers, training is regulated international under the STCW Convention. This requires seafarers in certain roles and departments to be licensed, that is tested to a certain level and in receipt of training documentation and for officer roles, a certificate of competency achieved through seatime as a cadet and through an approved period of training at a nautical college.

There are many charitable and welfare organisations that assist sailors around the world, including the Sailors' Society, the International Seafarers' Welfare and Assistance Network (ISWAN), the Marine Society, the Mission to Seafarers and others.

The rights of sailors who operate in a commercial capacity are set out and protected under the Maritime Labour Convention which was adopted in 2006 and entered into force in 2013.

== Language and culture ==
Sailors have developed and continue to use a vocabulary of words, phrases and slang for use at sea. This includes the use of a variety of nautical terms. In the Royal Navy for example, Jackspeak is a form of nautical speak or slang used at sea. Those working at sea in the offshore sector also use a variety of terms. The use of profanity, that is 'swearing as a sailor' is a typical cultural representation.

== See also ==
- List of sailors
- British Merchant Navy
- Marines
- Sailor suit
- United States Merchant Marine and United States Merchant Marine Academy
- Ocean rowing
- Sea shanty
