= Maritime transport =

Transport of people or goods via waterways

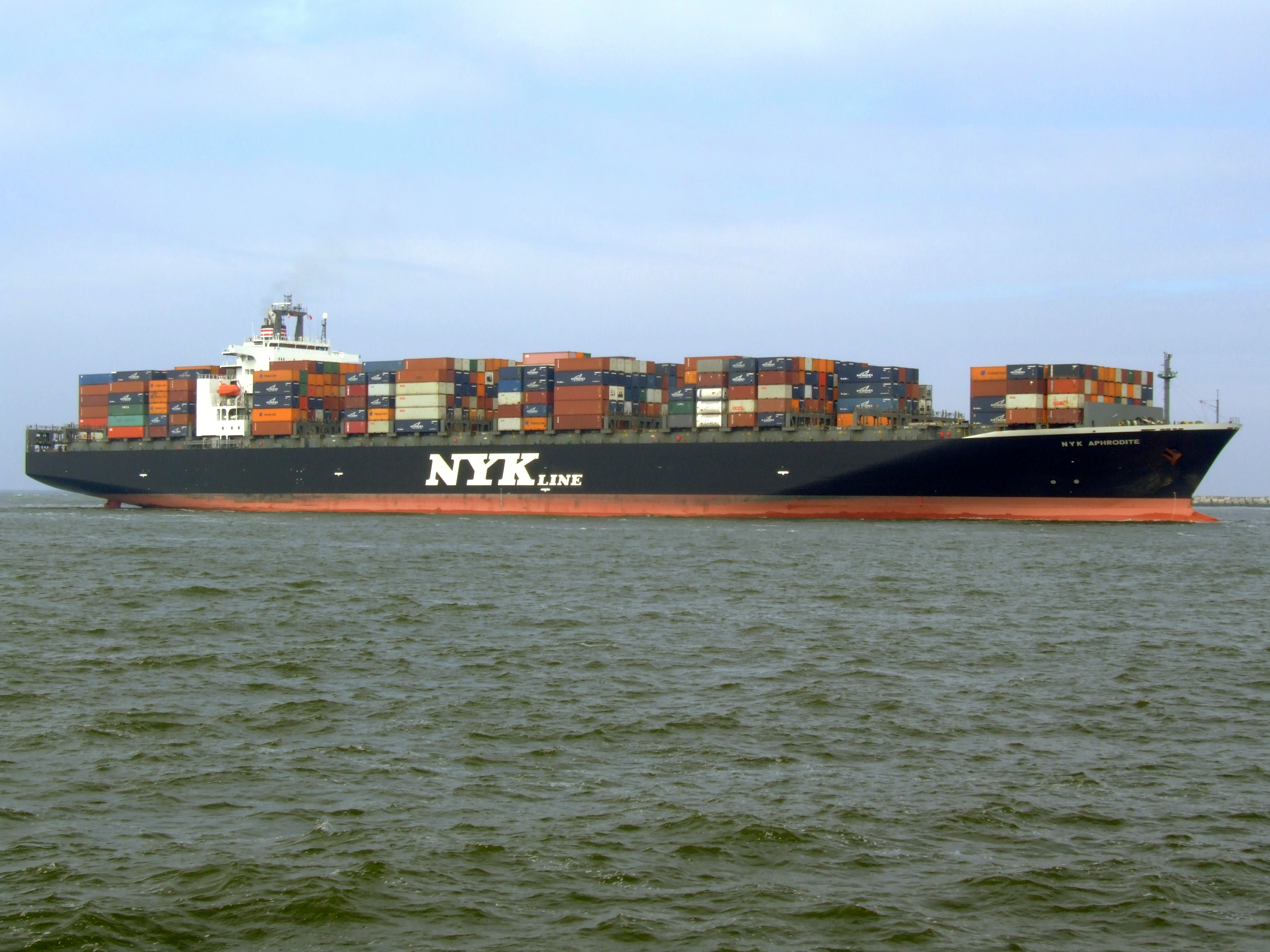
Nyk Aphrodite carrying up to 6500 containers

Maritime transport (or ocean transport) or more generally waterborne transport, is the transport of people (passengers) or goods (cargo) via waterways. Freight transport by watercraft has been widely used throughout recorded history, as it provides a higher-capacity mode of transportation for passengers and cargo than land transport, the latter typically being more costly per unit payload due to it being affected by terrain conditions and road/rail infrastructures. The advent of aviation during the 20th century has diminished the importance of sea travel for passengers, though it is still popular for short trips and pleasure cruises. Transport by watercraft is much cheaper than transport by aircraft or land vehicles (both road and rail), but is significantly slower for longer journeys and heavily dependent on adequate port facilities. Maritime transport accounts for roughly 80% of international trade, according to UNCTAD in 2020.

Maritime transport can be realized over any distance as long as there are connecting bodies of water that are navigable to boats, ships or barges such as oceans, lakes, rivers and canals. Shipping may be for commerce, recreation, or military purposes, and is an important aspect of logistics in human societies since early shipbuilding and river engineering were developed, leading to canal ages in various civilizations. While extensive inland shipping is less critical today, the major waterways of the world including many canals are still very important and are integral parts of worldwide economies. Particularly, especially any material can be moved by water; however, water transport becomes impractical when material delivery is time-critical such as various types of perishable produce. Still, water transport is highly cost effective with regular schedulable cargoes, such as trans-oceanic shipping of consumer products – and especially for heavy loads or bulk cargos, such as coal, coke, ores or grains. Arguably, the Industrial Revolution had its first impacts where cheap water transport by canal, navigations, or shipping by all types of watercraft on natural waterways supported cost-effective bulk transport.

Containerization revolutionized maritime transport starting in the 1970s. "General cargo" includes goods packaged in boxes, cases, pallets, and barrels. When a cargo is carried in more than one mode, it is intermodal or co-modal.

== Description ==
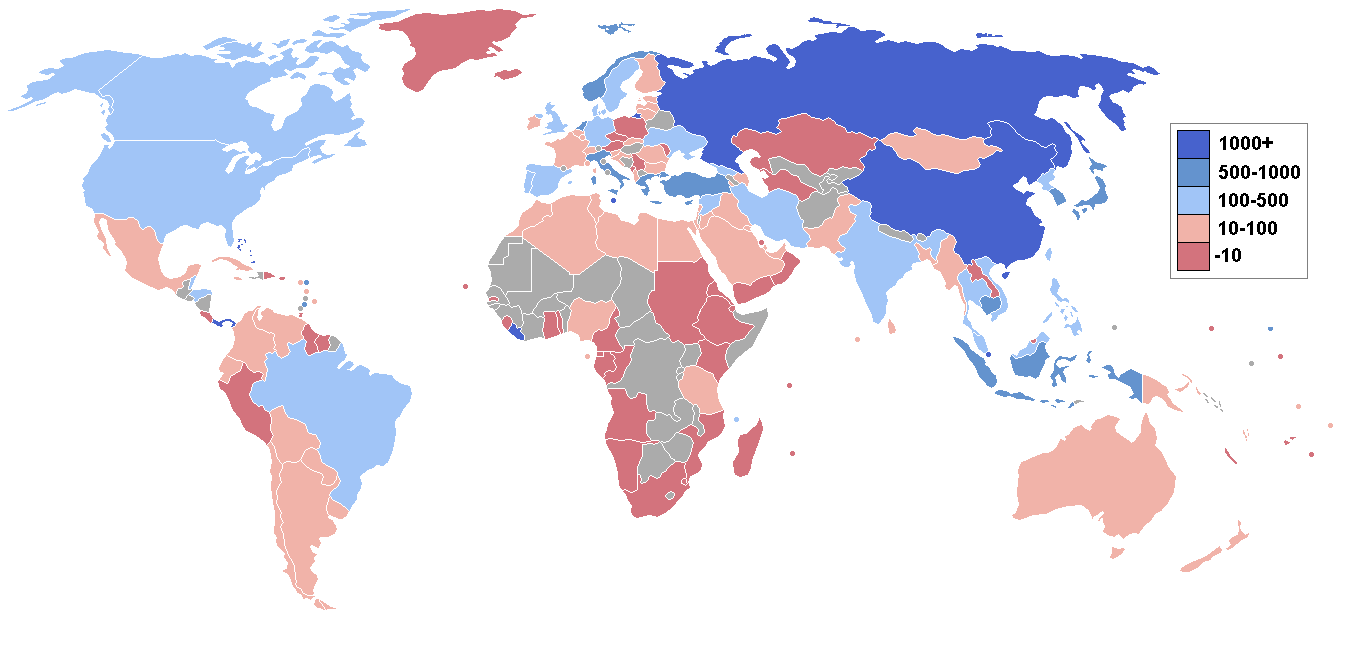
2005 registration of merchant ships (1,000 gross tonnage (GT) and over) per country

A nation's shipping fleet (variously called merchant navy, merchant marine, or merchant fleet) consists of the ships operated by civilian crews to transport passengers or cargo from one place to another. Merchant shipping also includes water transport over the river and canal systems connecting inland destinations, large and small. For example, during the early modern era, cities in the Hanseatic League began taming Northern Europe's rivers and harbors. Similarly, the Saint Lawrence Seaway connects the port cities on the Great Lakes in Canada and the United States with the Atlantic Ocean shipping routes, while the various Illinois canals connect the Great Lakes and Canada with New Orleans. Ores, coal, and grains can travel along the rivers of the American midwest to Pittsburgh or to Birmingham, Alabama. Professional mariners are known as merchant seamen, merchant sailors, and merchant mariners, or simply seamen, sailors, or mariners. The terms "seaman" or "sailor" may also refer to a member of a country's martial navy.

According to the 2005 CIA World Factbook, the total number of merchant ships of at least 1,000 gross register tons in the world was 30,936. In 2010, it was 38,988, an increase of 26%, across many countries. As of December 2018, a quarter of all merchant mariners were born in the Philippines.

=== Liners and tramps ===
A ship may also be categorized as to how it is operated.

- A liner will have a regular run and operate to a schedule. The scheduled operation requires that such ships are better equipped to deal with causes of potential delay such as bad weather. They are generally higher powered than tramp ships with better seakeeping qualities, thus they are significantly more expensive to build. Liners are typically built for passenger and container operation though past common uses also included mail and general cargo.
- A tramp (trader) has no fixed run but will go wherever a suitable cargo takes it. Thus a ship and crew may be chartered from the ship owner to fetch a cargo of grain from Canada to Latvia, the ship may then be required to carry a cargo of coal from Britain to Melanesia. Bulk carriers and some cruise ships are examples of ships built to operate in this manner.

=== Ships and watercraft ===
Ships and other watercraft are used for maritime transport. Types can be distinguished by propulsion, size or cargo type. Recreational or educational craft still use wind power, while some smaller craft use internal combustion engines to drive one or more propellers, or in the case of jet boats, an inboard water jet. In shallow-draft areas, such as the Everglades, some craft, such as the hovercraft, are propelled by large pusher-prop fans.

Most modern merchant ships can be placed in one of a few categories, such as:

Primary maritime transport types
Image	Description
	Bulk carriers ("bulkers") are cargo ships used to transport bulk cargo items such as ore or food staples (rice, grain, etc.) and similar cargo. They can be recognized by the large box-like hatches on their deck, designed to slide outboard for loading. A bulk carrier could be either dry or wet. Most lakes are too small to accommodate bulk ships, but a large fleet of lake freighters has been plying the Great Lakes and St. Lawrence Seaway of North America for over a century.
	Container ships are cargo ships that carry their entire load in truck-sized containers, in a technique called containerization. They form a common means of commercial intermodal freight transport. Informally known as "box boats", they carry the majority of the world's dry cargo. Most container ships are propelled by diesel engines and have crews of between 10 and 30 people. They generally have a large accommodation block at the stern, directly above the engine room.
	Cruise ships are passenger ships used for pleasure voyages, where the voyage itself and the ship's amenities are considered an essential part of the experience. Cruising has become a major part of the tourism industry, with millions of passengers each year as of 2006. The industry's rapid growth has seen nine or more newly built ships catering to a North American clientele added every year since 2001, as well as others servicing European clientele. Smaller markets such as the Asia-Pacific region are generally serviced by older tonnage displaced by new ships introduced into the high growth areas. On the Baltic Sea, ports are connected by cruiseferries.
	A multi-purpose ship (sometimes called a general cargo ship) is used to transport a variety of goods, from bulk commodities to break bulk and heavy cargoes. To provide maximum trading flexibility they are usually geared (supplied with cranes), and modern examples are fitted for the carriage of containers and grains. Generally they will have large open holds and tweendecks to facilitate the carriage of different cargoes on the same voyage. The crew will be highly competent in the securing of break bulk cargoes and the ship will be equipped with various lashings and other equipment for sea fastening.
	An ocean liner is a passenger ship designed to transport people from one seaport to another along regular long-distance maritime routes according to a schedule. Ocean liners may also carry cargo or mail, and may sometimes be used for other purposes. Ocean liners are usually strongly built with a high freeboard to withstand rough seas and adverse conditions encountered in the open ocean, having large capacities for fuel, food and other consumables on long voyages. These were the main stay of most passenger transport companies, however, due to the growth of air travel, the passenger ships saw a steady decline. Cruise ships later filled the void and are primarily used by people who still have a love of the sea and offer more amenities than the older passenger ships.
	Refrigerated ships (usually called reefers) are cargo ships typically used to transport perishable commodities which require temperature-controlled transportation, mostly fruits, meat, fish, vegetables, dairy products and other foodstuffs.
	Roll-on/roll-off ships are ships designed to transport wheeled cargo such as automobiles, trailers or railway carriages. RORO (or ro/ro) vessels have built-in ramps which allow the cargo to be efficiently "rolled on" and "rolled off" the vessel when in port. While smaller ferries that operate across rivers and other short distances still often have built-in ramps, the term RORO is generally reserved for larger ocean-going vessels, including pure car/truck carrier (PCTC) ships.
	Tankers are cargo ships for the transport of fluids, such as crude oil, petroleum products, liquefied petroleum gas (LPG), liquefied natural gas (LNG) and chemicals, also vegetable oils, wine and other food. The tanker sector comprises one third of the world tonnage.
Secondary maritime transport types
	A barge is a flat-bottomed boat, built mainly for river and canal transport of heavy goods. Most barges are not self-propelled and need to be moved by tugboats or towboats pushing or towing them. Barges on canals (towed by draft animals on an adjacent towpath) established the conditions supporting the early Industrial Revolution in both Europe and the American Northeast but later after they made possible steam locomotive prime movers riding iron rails – after both could grow (and mature) to become commonplace and capable – contended with the railways and were outcompeted in the carriage of people, light freight, and high value items due to the higher speed, falling costs, and route flexibility of rail transport. Carriage of bulk goods also gradually lost ground to freight railways as train capacity and speeds continued to climb. Even underpowered early rail networks could usually reach places only an outrageously expensive canal might be built, and once Iron T-rails and higher powered locomotives became possible, the far cheaper to build railways were unfettered and independent upon water sources, while mostly unplagued by the seasonal problems (restricted by icing) of temperate latitude canals which suffered ice and freshet flooding damages with dreary regularity. When floods did affect railways, restoration of services was usually comparatively rapid.
	Cable layer is a deep-sea vessel designed and used to lay underwater cables for telecommunications, electricity, and such. A large superstructure, and one or more spools that feed off the transom distinguish it. Modern cable layers are equipped with advanced dynamic positioning systems (DPS) to maintain precise control during cable deployment, even in rough sea conditions. These vessels often feature specialized equipment such as remotely operated vehicles (ROVs) to assist with underwater cable positioning, inspections, and repairs.
Warnemünde Handelsschiff (01) 2006-09-21	Coastal trading vessels, also known as coasters, ships used for trade between locations on the same island or continent. They are often small and of shallow draft, and sometimes set up as self-dischargers.
	Ferries are a form of transport, usually a boat or ship, but also other forms, carrying (or ferrying) passengers and sometimes their vehicles. Ferries are also used to transport freight (in lorries and sometimes unpowered freight containers) and even railroad cars. Most ferries operate on regular, frequent return services. A foot-passenger ferry with many stops is sometimes called a waterbus or water taxi. Ferries form a part of the public transport systems of many waterside cities and islands, allowing direct transit between points at a capital cost much lower than bridges or tunnels. Many of the ferries operating in Northern European waters are roll-on/roll-off ships.
	A tugboat is a boat used to manoeuvre, primarily by towing or pushing, other vessels (see shipping) in harbours, over the open sea or through rivers and canals. They are also used to tow barges, disabled ships, or other equipment like towboats.
	Open hatch general cargo ships are designed to transport forest products, bulk cargos, unitized cargoes, project cargoes and containers.
	Semi-submersible heavy-lift ships often move particularly large, heavy, or bulky goods that other ships cannot handle well. Such off-size goods include ship hulls, premade construction materials, other seagoing vessels, power plant components, cast steel objects, and a variety of very large or heavy goods.

=== Typical in-transit times ===
A cargo ship sailing from a European port to a US one will typically take 10–12 days depending on water currents and other factors. To make container ship transport more economical, ship operators sometimes reduce cruising speed, thereby increasing transit time, to reduce fuel consumption, a strategy referred to as "slow steaming".

== History ==
Maritime transport began in prehistory: around 4000 BCE, when people living in river-valley and coastal societies, such as in Mesopotamia, developed basic watercraft to move people, food and goods along waterways. Over millennia, the invention of sails and refined hull-building techniques enabled increasingly complex seafaring, laying the foundations for ancient maritime trade routes and long-distance commerce.

For much of history, maritime trade relied on relatively simple ships transporting bulk cargo or loose goods ("break-bulk" cargo), loaded and unloaded manually at ports. With the rise of global trade in the 20th century, this labor-intensive method became a bottleneck for efficiency.

From then onward, standardised containers and purpose-built container ships replaced much of the older trade methods, boosting the speed, scale, and reliability of international maritime freight and enabling interconnected global supply chains of today.

== Professional mariners ==
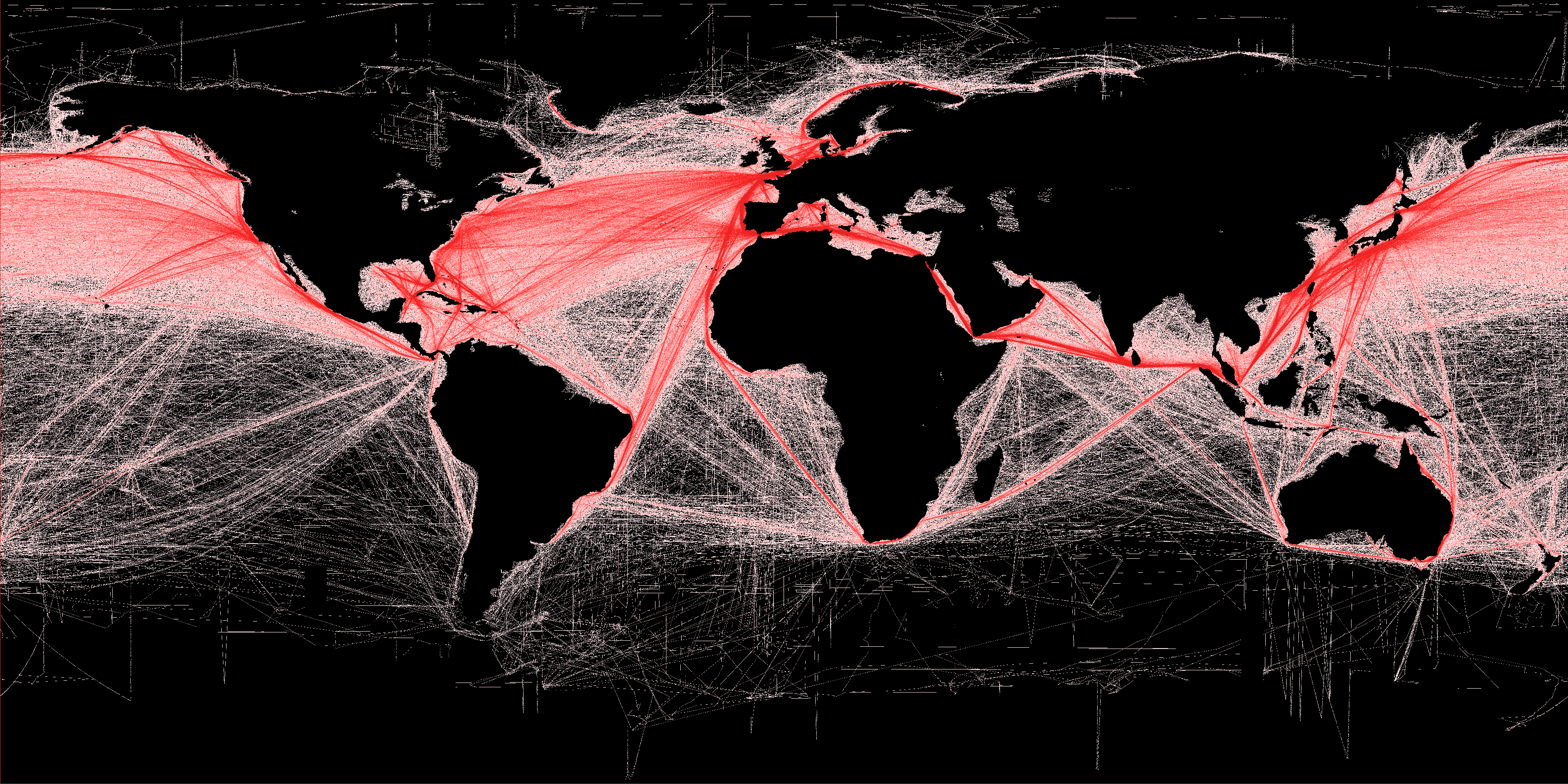
This map of shipping routes illustrates the relative density of commercial shipping in the world's oceans.

A ship's complement can be divided into four categories:

1. The deck department
2. The engine department
3. The steward's department
4. Other.

=== Deck department ===
An able seaman stands iceberg lookout on the bow of the freighter USNS Southern Cross during a re-supply mission to McMurdo Station, Antarctica; circa 1981.

Officer positions in the deck department include but not limited to the Master and his Chief, Second, and Third officers. The official classifications for unlicensed members of the deck department are Able Seaman and Ordinary Seaman.

A common deck crew for a ship includes:

- (1) Chief Officer/Chief Mate
- (1) Second Officer/Second Mate
- (1) Third Officer/Third Mate
- (1) Boatswain
- (2–6) Able Seamen
- (0–2) Ordinary Seamen

A deck cadet is a person who is carrying out mandatory sea time to achieve their officer of the watch certificate. Their time on board is spent learning the operations and tasks of everyday life on a merchant vessel.

=== Engine department ===
A ship's engine department consists of the members of a ship's crew that operate and maintain the propulsion and other systems on board the vessel. Engine staff also deal with the "Hotel" facilities on board, notably the sewage, lighting, air conditioning, and water systems. They deal with bulk fuel transfers, and require training in firefighting and first aid, as well as in dealing with the ship's boats and other nautical tasks- especially with cargo loading/discharging gear and safety systems, though the specific cargo discharge function remains the responsibility of deck officers and deck workers. On LPG and LNG tankers, however, a cargo engineer works with the deck department during cargo operations, as well as being a watchkeeping engineer.

A common engine crew for a ship includes:

- (1) Chief engineer
- (1) Second engineer / first assistant engineer
- (1) Third engineer / second assistant engineer
- (1 or 2) Fourth engineer / third assistant engineer
- (0–2) Fifth engineer / junior engineer
- (1–3) Oiler (unlicensed qualified rating)
- (0–3) Greaser (unlicensed qualified rating)
- (1–5) Entry-level rating (such as wiper (occupation), utilityman, etc.)

Many American ships also carry a motorman. Other possible positions include machinist, electrician, refrigeration engineer, and tankerman. Engine cadets are engineer trainees who are completing sea time necessary before they can obtain a watchkeeping license.

=== Steward's department ===
A typical steward's department for a cargo ship would be composed of a chief steward, a chief cook, and a steward's assistant. All three positions are typically filled by unlicensed personnel. The chief steward directs, instructs, and assigns personnel performing such functions as preparing and serving meals; cleaning and maintaining officers' quarters and steward department areas; and receiving, issuing, and inventorying stores. On large passenger vessels, the Catering Department is headed by the chief purser and managed by assistant pursers. Although they enjoy the benefits of having officer rank, they generally progress through the ranks to become pursers. Under the pursers are the department heads – such as chief cook, head waiter, head barman etc. They are responsible for the administration of their own areas.

The chief steward also plans menus and compiles supply, overtime, and cost control records. They may requisition or purchase stores and equipment. They may bake bread, rolls, cakes, pies, and pastries. A chief steward's duties may overlap with those of the steward's assistant, the chief cook, and other Steward's Department crewmembers.

In the United States Merchant Marine, a chief steward must have a Merchant Mariner's Document issued by the United States Coast Guard. Because of international law, conventions, and agreements, all chief cooks who sail internationally are similarly documented by their respective countries.

=== Other departments ===
Staff officer positions on a ship, including junior assistant purser, senior assistant purser, purser, chief purser, medical doctor, professional nurse, marine physician sssistant, and hospital corpsman, are considered administrative positions and are therefore regulated by certificates of tegistry issued by the United States Coast Guard. Pilots are also merchant marine officers and are licensed by the Coast Guard. Formerly, there was also a radio department, headed by a chief radio officer and supported by a number of radio officers. Since the introduction of GMDSS (Satellite communications) and the subsequent exemptions from carrying radio officers if the vessel is so equipped, this department has fallen away, although many ships do still carry specialist radio officers, particularly passenger vessels. Many radio officers became 'electro-technical officers', and transferred into the engine department.

=== Life at sea ===
Mariners spend much of their life beyond the reach of land. They sometimes face dangerous conditions at sea or on lakes – the fishing port of Gloucester, Massachusetts has a seaside memorial listing over 10,000 fishermen who lost their lives to the sea, and the Great Lakes have seen over 10,000 lost vessels since the 1800s.

Findings by the Seafarer's International Research Center indicate a leading cause of mariners leaving the industry is "almost invariably because they want to be with their families". U.S. merchant ships typically do not allow family members to accompany seafarers on voyages. Industry experts increasingly recognize isolation, stress, and fatigue as occupational hazards. Advocacy groups such as International Labour Organization, a United Nations agency, and the Nautical Institute are seeking improved international standards for mariners. Satellite phones have improved communication and efficiency aboard sea-faring ships. This technology has contributed to crew welfare, although both equipment and fees are expensive.

Ocean voyages are steeped in routine. Maritime tradition dictates that each day be divided into six four-hour periods. Three groups of watch keepers from the engine and deck departments work four hours on then have eight hours off watch keeping. However, there are many overtime jobs to be done daily. This cycle repeats endlessly, 24 hours a day while the ship is at sea. Members of the steward department typically are day workers who put in at least eight-hour shifts. Operations at sea, including repairs, safeguarding against piracy, securing cargo, underway replenishment, and other duties provide opportunities for overtime work. Service aboard ships typically extends for months at a time, followed by protracted shore leave. However, some seamen secure jobs on ships they like and stay aboard for years.

The quick turnaround of many modern ships, spending only a few hours in port, limits a seafarer's free-time ashore. Moreover, some foreign seamen entering U.S. ports from a watch list of 25 countries face restrictions on shore leave due to maritime security concerns. However, shore leave restrictions while in U.S. ports impact American seamen as well. For example, the International Organization of Masters, Mates & Pilots notes a trend of U.S. shipping terminal operators restricting seamen from traveling from the ship to the terminal gate. Furthermore, in cases where transit is allowed, special "security fees" are at times assessed.

Such restrictions on shore leave, coupled with reduced time in port, translate into longer periods at sea. Mariners report that extended periods at sea living and working with shipmates, who for the most part are strangers, takes getting used to. At the same time, there is an opportunity to meet people from other ethnic and cultural backgrounds. Recreational opportunities have improved aboard some U.S. ships, which may feature gyms and day rooms for watching movies, swapping sea stories, and other activities. And in some cases, especially tankers, it is possible for a mariner to be accompanied by members of his family. However, a mariner's off-duty time is largely a solitary affair, pursuing hobbies, reading, writing letters, and sleeping.

On modern ocean-going vessels, typically registered with a flag of convenience, life has changed immensely in the last 20 years. Most large vessels include a gym and often a swimming pool for use by the crew. Since the Exxon Valdez incident, the focus of leisure time activity has shifted from having officer and crew bars, to simply having lounge-style areas where officers or crew can sit to watch movies. With many companies now providing TVs and DVD players in cabins, and enforcing strict smoking policies, it is not surprising that the bar is now a much quieter place on most ships. In some instances games consoles are provided for the officers and crew. The officers enjoy a much higher standard of living on board ocean-going vessels.

Crews are generally poorly paid, poorly qualified and have to complete contracts of approximately 9 months before returning home on leave. They often come from countries where the average industrial wage is still very low, such as the Philippines or India. Officers however, come from all over the world and it is not uncommon to mix the nationality of the officers on board ships. Officers are often the recipients of university degrees and have completed vast amounts of training to reach their rank. Officers benefit e.g. by having larger, more comfortable cabins and table service for their meals.

Contracts average at the 4-month mark for officers, with generous leave. Most ocean-going vessels now operate an unmanned engine room system allowing engineers to work days only. The engine room is computer controlled by night, although the duty engineer will make inspections during unmanned operation. Engineers work in a hot, humid, noisy atmosphere. Communication in the engine room is therefore by hand signals and lip-reading, and good teamwork often stands in place of any communication at all.

== Infrastructure ==
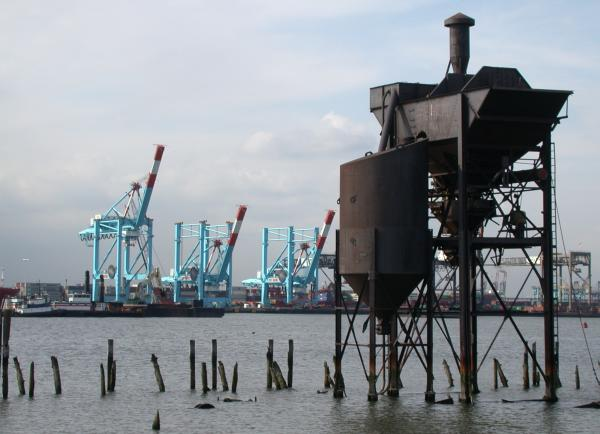
Container port facilities in Newark Bay, seen from Bayonne, New Jersey, United States

For a port to efficiently send and receive cargo, it requires infrastructure: docks, bollards, pilings, cranes, bulk cargo handling equipment, and so on – equipment and organization supporting the role of the facilities. From pier to pier these may differ, one dock handling intermodal transport needs (container-ships linked to rail by cranes); another bulk handling capabilities (such as conveyors, elevators, tanks, pumps) for loading and unloading bulk cargoes like grain, coal, or fuels. Others may be outfitted as passenger terminals or for mixed mode operations.

Generally, Harbors, seaports and marinas all host watercraft, and consist of components such as piers, wharfs, docks and roadsteads.

== Environmental impact ==
The environmental impact of shipping includes greenhouse gas emissions, acoustic, and oil pollution. The International Maritime Organization (IMO) estimates that Carbon dioxide emissions from shipping were equal to 2.2% of the global human-made emissions in 2012 and expects them to rise 50 to 250 percent by 2050 if no action is taken. The IEA forecasts that ammonia will meet approximately 45% of shipping fuel demands by 2050.

== Innovation and development ==
The global economy relies heavily on maritime transportation. Maritime transport accounts for over 80% of international trade, according to UNCTAD in 2021, and the percentage is even higher for most developing countries. In its Review of Maritime transport 2024, UNCTAD, points out that « the sector, whose greenhouse gas emissions have risen 20% over the last decade, operates an ageing fleet that runs almost exclusively on fossil fuels ». Besides, maritime trade is expected to grow 2.4% in 2023 and more than 2% between 2024 and 2028.

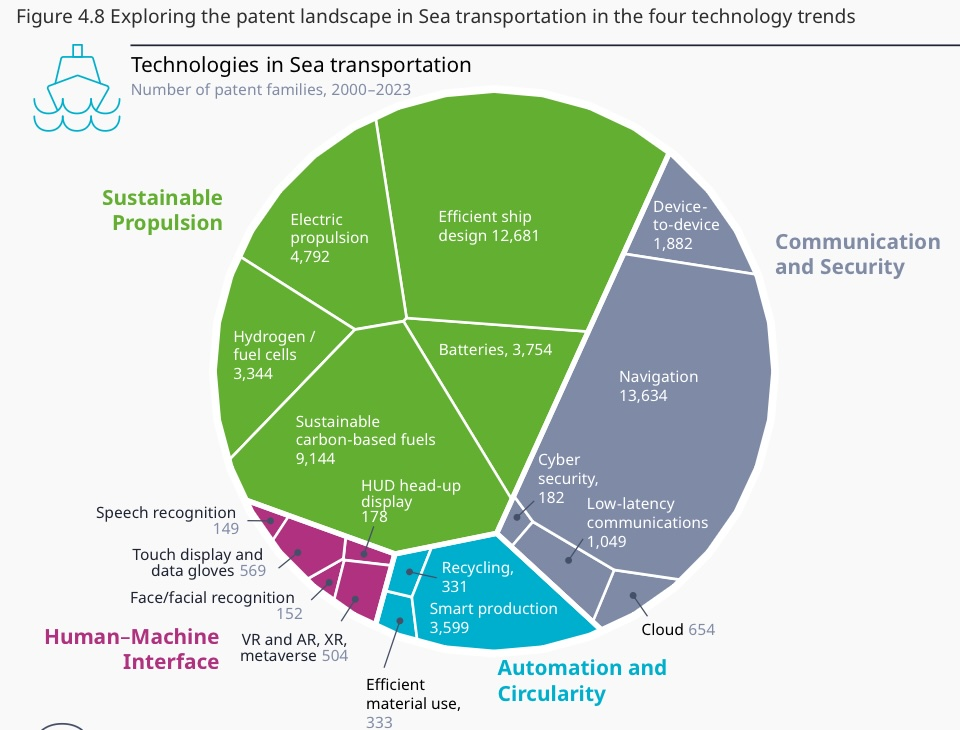
Technology trends in Sea transportation: patent landscape in maritime transport

Two significant megatrends are observed in terms of maritime transport innovation, sustainability and digitalization. A report published by WIPO in 2025 show a steady increase of patents publication in maritime transportation, the majority of which being related to sustainable propulsion, followed by communication and security.

Transitioning to more sustainable forms of propulsion will help reach decarbonization targets. Technological breakthroughs are advancing low and zero-emission solutions, including more sustainable carbon-based fuels, hydrogen, methanol, ammonia, electric propulsion, and optimizing energy consumption through efficient ship design. However, according to the report, scaling up production and ensuring the cost-effectiveness of carbon-neutral fuels remains a challenge.

Between 2000 and 2023, the number of published patent families in sustainable propulsion increased annually from less than 300 to more than 2,800. In this field, the most important area in terms of patent families is efficient ship design. This includes research activities focused on optimizing hull shape so as to minimize drag, designing efficient propellers or introducing air bubbles under the hull. China is the leader in efficient ship design, batteries and electric propulsion, and South Korea has published the most patent families in hydrogen/fuel cell research and sustainable fuels. Another important research area is sustainable carbon-based fuels. The vast majority of patents in this area relate to liquified natural gas (LNG) fuels for ships.

Communication and Security technologies are making ships smarter and safer, with key research areas including navigation, device-to-device communication, low-latency communications, cloud platforms, and cybersecurity. Piracy and terror attacks remain a threat in international shipping, with global piracy and armed robbery incidents having increased in 2023 compared to 2022.

Automation and Circularity technologies could boost productivity and enable more energy-efficient ships, with key research themes including efficient material use, smart production and robotics technology, and recycling, but represent a very small area of patenting in the last decade.

Human-Machine-Interface technologies are emerging as useful tools to improve the way we interact with ships. However, all HMI technologies are still in the early stages of development with little adoption in shipping. Research areas include extended reality technologies, speech recognition technology, facial recognition, and touch displays.

Map of the main shipping routes, choke points, straits, transoceanic canals and the largest container ports (in 2018)

Over 70% of all Sea transport patents come from Asia, led by China (36%), South Korea (25%) and Japan (9%). China's growth has been on an upward trajectory since 2016, whereas the increase from the South Korea started earlier in 2010 but since 2012 annual filings from Korean inventors have remained relatively stable. Denmark is the most dynamic European nation, followed by Finland, and France, although absolute patent numbers remain relatively small. Only 14% of patents are from Europe and 11% from North America. Top patents owners are companies or universities, such as Harbin Engineering University, Mitsubishi Heavy Industries, Wuhan University of Technology, Gaztransport & Technigaz, or Dalian Maritime University.

== See also ==
- Electric ship
- European Union shipping law
- Glossary of nautical terms (A-L)
- Glossary of nautical terms (M-Z)
- List of cargo types
- List of maritime colleges
- List of merchant marine capacity by country
- List of sailors
- List of ship companies
- Lloyd's War Medal for Bravery at Sea
- The Marine Society
- Maritime history
- Maritime safety
- Merchant vessel
- UNCTAD review of maritime transport
- MV Yara Birkeland
- Navigation
- Navigability
- Shipping line
- SIGTTO
- Waterway
- Ship watching
- World Association for Waterborne Transport Infrastructure
