= Antonia Ferrín Moreiras =

Mathematician and astronomer

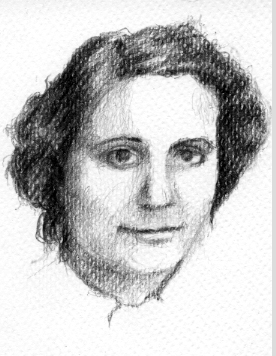
- Portrait of Antonia Ferrín Moreiras
- Born: 13 May 1914; Ourense, Spain
- Died: 6 August 2009 (aged 95); Santiago de Compostela, Spain
- Education: University of Santiago de Compostela; Complutense University of Madrid
- Known for: The first female Galician astronomer
- Awards: Patroness of the 15 anniversary of the Faculty of Mathematics of the USC
- Scientific career
- Fields: Mathematics/astronomy
- Workplaces: University of Santiago de Compostela
- Thesis: Observaciones de pasos por dos verticales (1963)

Antonia Ferrín Moreiras (Ourense, 13 May 1914 – Santiago de Compostela, 6 August 2009) was a mathematician, professor and the first female Galician astronomer. Her main contributions to astronomy were works on stellar occultations by the moon, measures of double stars and astrometric measurements, as well as the determination of the passage of stars through two verticals. She accomplished all of this while she was working at the Observatory of the University of Santiago de Compostela (USC).

Before the Spanish Civil War, she obtained degrees in chemistry and pharmacy from the USC, earned her teaching diploma and studied Exact Sciences, the name for mathematics, for two years. She obtained her degree in mathematics in the Complutense University of Madrid some years later.

In 1963 she became the first Spanish woman to defend a thesis that addressed the issue of astronomy: Observaciones de pasos por dos verticales (in English, Observations of passages of stars through two verticals). This thesis was also the first defended in the Faculty of Mathematics of the USC.

Economic hardship forced her to study and work at the same time, but she earned scholarships that helped her reach her academic goals.

== Biography ==
=== Early years ===
Antonia Ferrín Moreiras was born in Ourense on 13 May 1914, and was the third of four daughters. Contrary to the conventions of the time, and despite the limited economic resources of the family, her father, a mathematics teacher, wanted all his daughters – Antonia, Celsa, María and Pastora, to have access to higher-level studies, so the family moved to Santiago de Compostela in 1920.

Ferrín started school when she was seven years old and at only nine years old, she was ready to start high school. She did the Scientific Bachillerato, which is the stage of education for people over the age of 16 in Spain. After that, she studied the University Bachillerato, since admission to the university required the completion of this education stage, with twelve other girls.

=== Higher education and professional career ===
Ferrin started her higher education studies in the Faculty of Sciences of the USC, at a time when chemistry was the only major offered. Even though her father worked in the Faculty of Pharmacy, his income was not enough, so she obtained free tuition and scholarships. With such financial support, she could earn a degree in chemistry and the title of Schoolteacher in 1935.

She started working immediately after she graduated, but her first jobs were not paid. From 1934 to 1936, Ferrín worked as training assistant teacher of physics and mathematics in the Faculty of Sciences of the USC and as temporary assistant teacher in the Department of Science of the high school Arcebispo Xelmírez in Santiago de Compostela. At the same time, she was pursuing a pharmacy degree and the only two courses of Exact Sciences that the USC offered. In 1937, she started working as mathematics teacher in the orphan girls' school Nuestra Señora de los Remedios, a position she held until 1948.

In 1937, after the outbreak of the Spanish Civil War, she was sanctioned because of her political convictions, and an anonymous complaint lead to the opening of her file. As a result, she was removed from her duties as university teacher along with 45 other teachers. In 1940, however, she got her case reviewed, the sentence was revoked and she could teach again. After her removal, she restarted teaching at the university and sometimes she gave lessons in the girls' school until 1961.

During the academic year 1939–1940, Ferrin completed the prerequisite courses for the pharmacy degree. It was during this time that she met Ramón María Aller, the founder and director of the Astronomical Observatory of the USC, and the person who made it possible for her to become the first female Galician astronomer. In that observatory, Ferrín started to use the passage instrument and the 12 cm (4.7 in) refracting telescope, which allowed her to visualize the concealment of stars by the moon, the passage of stars through two verticals, or micrometric measurements of double stars. The results of these investigations were published in the Spanish magazine of astronomy, Urania. Ferrín recalled anecdotally that it was really cold while she was doing her research in the observatory. She never wore trousers because, according to her, it was a piece of clothing that "was not considered feminine and only the more daring movie actresses wore them on the big screen."

In 1950, she received a scholarship from the Spanish National Research Council to conduct research in the Astronomical Observatory of Santiago. This scholarship became a contract of research assistantship two years later. In the same year, she obtained a degree in mathematics from the Complutense University of Madrid, even though she was a guest student for the last three courses of the degree.

In 1953, she passed the civil service examinations for professor of mathematics in the Escuela de Magisterio of Santander. However, two years later, she transferred to the girls' school Isabel la Católica of Santiago.

From 1954 until 1956 she studied to earn a doctorate in astronomy in Madrid. In the meantime, she helped professor Vidal Abascal to create the degree in mathematics in the Faculty of Sciences of the USC, a feat accomplished in 1957. Ferrín became the first female professor of this faculty. During this time, she continued her research under the direction of Ramón María Aller.

The thesis that she defended in 1963 with the help of Aller, even though he was 80 years old, was probably her greatest accomplishment not only because it was the first read in the Faculty of Mathematics of the USC, but also the first one defended by a woman addressing the issue of astronomy in Spain. In 1963, she was appointed as full-time professor of mathematics in the Escuela de Magisterio Santa María in Madrid and she also worked as professor of mathematics in the degree of medicine for two years. In addition, she taught astronomy and celestial mechanics, she served in management, and sat on the selection boards. She also participated in the first international meetings of mathematics that were carried out in Spain.

However, in spite of her great professional career, being a woman sometimes stood in the way of her aspirations. For example, when Aller got sick in 1964, a substitute was needed so that Aller's chair of astronomy in the observatory could continue. Even though she applied for the public examination, she was excluded. She was considered as an applicant following a complaint, but the chair was declared void and the observatory deteriorated.

Ferrín retired in 1984.

== Honors ==
On 24 May 2008, she was proclaimed as the patroness of the fiftieth anniversary of the Faculty of Mathematics of the USC.

=== Eponymous ===
- Lecture room of the Faculty of Mathematics of the USC.
- Award for the creation of education materials and resources with gender perspective in the University of Vigo.
