= Nautical operations =

Crew operation of a ship

Nautical operations refers to the crew operation of a ship. It is the term used in academic education to refer to the studies of this professional field. (Note: Please note that "ship operations" could be interpreted several ways; it could refer to the physical operation of the ship itself, i.e. the actual functioning of the ship's engines and physical equipment, or the navigation of the ship on the sea, or the actual functioning of the crew in their respective roles.) Nautical operations refers to all the operational procedures, specific roles of officers and crew members, and regular functions and technical processes, which together shape the structure and functions for the general operations of a ship.

== Ship functions ==
There are several functions which are generally common to all vessels of all types.

=== Navigation ===
==== One day's work in navigation ====
The day's work in navigation is a minimal set of tasks consistent with prudent navigation. The definition will vary on military and civilian vessels, and from ship to ship, but the traditional method takes a form resembling:

1. Maintain a continuous dead reckoning plot.
2. Take two or more star observations at morning twilight for a celestial fix (prudent to observe 6 stars).
3. Morning Sun observation. Can be taken on or near prime vertical for longitude, or at any time for a line of position.
4. Determine compass error by azimuth observation of the Sun.
5. Computation of the interval to noon, watch time of local apparent noon, and constants for meridian or ex-meridian sights.
6. Noontime meridian or ex-meridian observation of the Sun for noon latitude line. Running fix or cross with Venus line for noon fix.
7. Noontime determination the day's run and day's set and drift.
8. At least one afternoon sun line, in case the stars are not visible at twilight.
9. Determine compass error by azimuth observation of the Sun.
10. Take two or more star observations at evening twilight for a celestial fix (prudent to observe 6 stars).

Navigation on ships is usually always conducted on the bridge. It may also take place in adjacent space, where chart tables and publications are available.

==== Passage planning ====
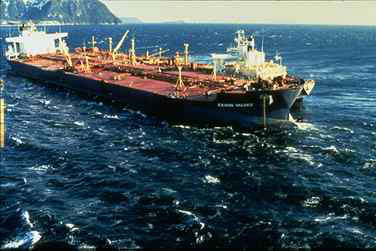
Poor passage planning and deviation from the plan can lead to groundings, ship damage and cargo loss.

Passage planning or voyage planning is a procedure to develop a complete description of vessel's voyage from start to finish. The plan includes leaving the dock and harbor area, the en route portion of a voyage, approaching the destination, and mooring. According to international law, a vessel's captain is legally responsible for passage planning, however on larger vessels, the task will be delegated to the ship's navigator.

Studies show that human error is a factor in 80 percent of navigational accidents and that in many cases the human making the error had access to information that could have prevented the accident. The practice of voyage planning has evolved from penciling lines on nautical charts to a process of risk management.

Passage planning consists of four stages: appraisal, planning, execution, and monitoring, which are specified in International Maritime Organization Resolution A.893(21), Guidelines For Voyage Planning, and these guidelines are reflected in the local laws of IMO signatory countries (for example, Title 33 of the U.S. Code of Federal Regulations), and a number of professional books or publications. There are some fifty elements of a comprehensive passage plan depending on the size and type of vessel.

The appraisal stage deals with the collection of information relevant to the proposed voyage as well as ascertaining risks and assessing the key features of the voyage. This will involve considering the type of navigation required e.g. Ice navigation, the region the ship will be passing through and the hydrographic information on the route. In the next stage, the written plan is created. The third stage is the execution of the finalised voyage plan, taking into account any special circumstances which may arise such as changes in the weather, which may require the plan to be reviewed or altered. The final stage of passage planning consists of monitoring the vessel's progress in relation to the plan and responding to deviations and unforeseen circumstances.

==== Integrated bridge systems ====
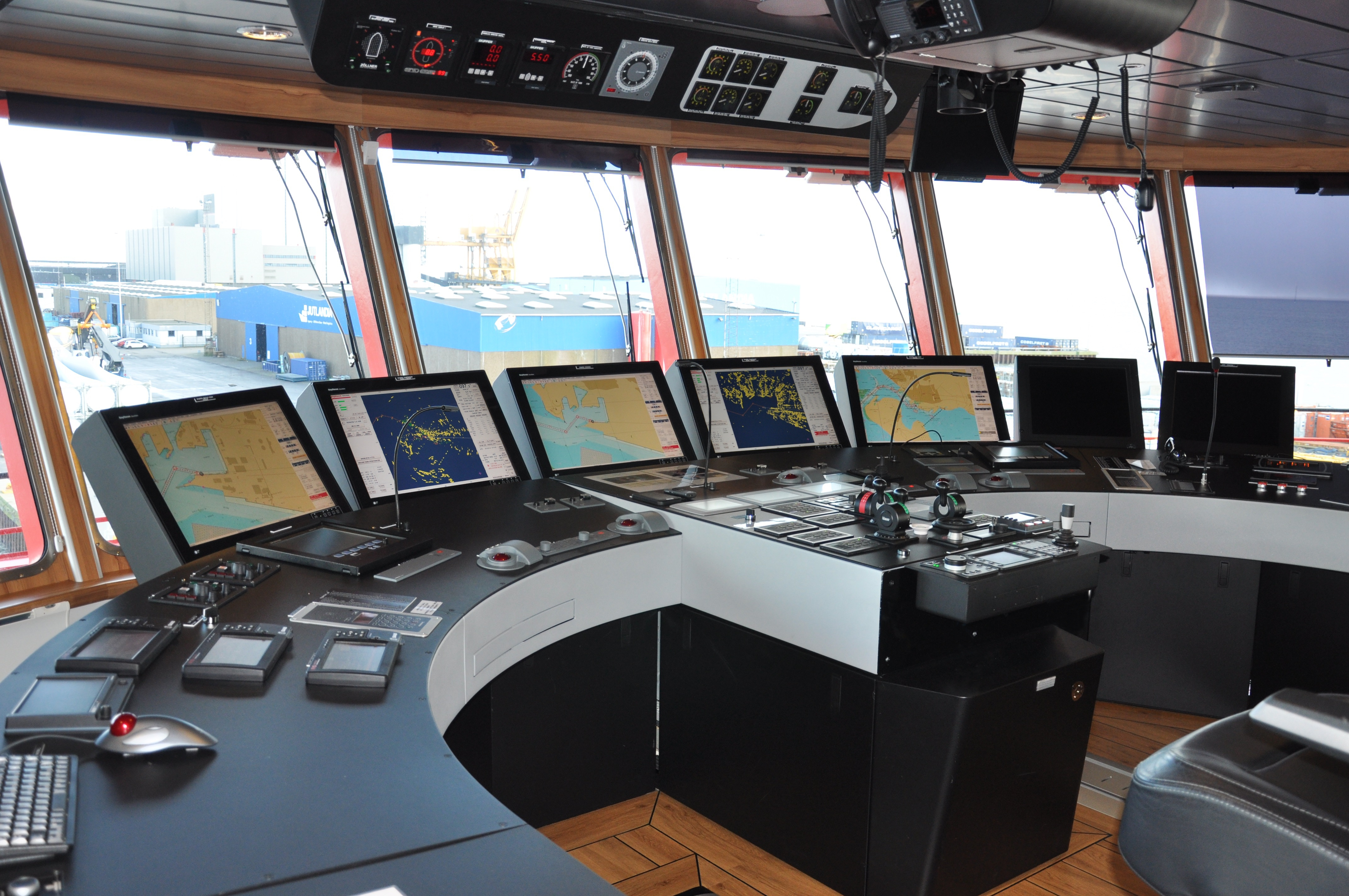
Integrated Bridge System, integrated on an Offshore Service Ship

Electronic integrated bridge concepts are driving future navigation system planning. Integrated systems take inputs from various ship sensors, electronically display positioning information, and provide control signals required to maintain a vessel on a preset course. The navigator becomes a system manager, choosing system presets, interpreting system output, and monitoring vessel response.

== Individual crew roles and ranks ==
=== Captain ===
The captain or master is the ship's highest responsible officer, acting on behalf of the ship's owner. Whether the captain is a member of the deck department or not is a matter of some controversy, and generally depends on the opinion of an individual captain. When a ship has a third mate, the captain does not stand watch.

The captain is responsible for the day-to-day affairs of the ship under their command. It is their responsibility to ensure that all the departments perform to the requirements. Therefore, the heads of the various departments answer to him. The captain represents the owner and hence is called "master." The captain is officially not considered to be a crew member, which seems to resolve the controversy mentioned above.

=== Deck department ===
==== Deck officers ====
Deck officers are licensed mariners who are responsible for the navigation and safe passage of the ship.

===== Chief mate =====
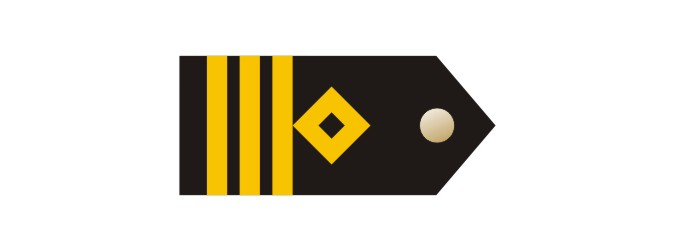
Epaulettes worn by the chief officer on merchant ships (similar to those worn by a commander in the Commonwealth navies)

The chief mate is the head of the deck department on a merchant's vessel, second-in-command after the ship's master. The chief mate's primary responsibilities are the vessel's cargo operations, its stability, and supervising the deck crew. The mate is responsible for the safety and security of the ship, as well as the welfare of the crew on board. The chief mate typically stands the 4–8 navigation watch as OICNW (officer-in-charge of the navigational watch), directing the bridge team. Some crews have additional Third mates, which allow the chief mate to not stand navigational watch, and focus more on cargo and deck operations. Additional duties include maintenance of the ship's hull, cargo gears, accommodations, life-saving appliances, and firefighting appliances. The chief mate also trains the crew and cadets on various aspects like safety, firefighting, search and rescue, and other contingencies. The chief officer assumes command of the whole ship in the absence or incapacitation of the master.

===== Second mate =====
The second mate is a qualified OICNW watch stander, directing the bridge team and navigating the ship. The second mate is the third most-experienced deck department officer after the captain/master and chief mate. The second mate's primary duty is navigational, which includes updating charts and publications, keeping them current, making passage plans, and all aspects of ship navigation. The second mate's other duties may include directing line handlers, cargo watches, directing anchor detail and training and instructing crew members.

===== Third mate =====
The third officer is a qualified OICNW watch-stander, junior to the second mate. When on navigational watch, the third mate directs the bridge team, maneuvering the vessel, keeping it safe and on track. The third mate's primary duty is matters of safety, inspecting gear lockers, lifeboats, and all equipment on board ensuring that it is safe and operational. Other duties include directing line handlers, cargo watches, directing anchor details and training and instructing crew members. He or she is normally the part of the command team during emergencies and drills.

===== Deck cadet =====
A deck cadet or trainee navigational officer or nautical apprentice is an apprentice who has to learn the basic duties of a deck officer on board a ship. Deck cadets after sufficient sea time and exams attain certificate of competency of OICNW.

==== Deck ratings ====
Mariners without a certificate of competence are called ratings. They assist in all other tasks that can arise during a voyage. This includes for example, mooring, cleaning of the ship and its holds and repairing broken lines and ropes. These are physically challenging jobs and have to be done regardless of the weather. />

===== Boatswain =====
The boatswain is the highest ranking unlicensed (rating) in the deck department. The boatswain generally carries out the tasks instructed by the chief mate, directing the able seamen and ordinary seamen. The boatswain generally does not stand a navigational watch.

===== Able bodied seaman =====
An able bodied seaman (AB) works under the boatswain, completing tasks such as working mooring lines, operating deck gear, standing anchor details, and working cargo. An able bodied seaman also stands a navigational watch, generally as a lookout or helmsman.

===== Ordinary seaman =====
The lowest ranking personnel in the deck department. An ordinary seaman (OS) generally helps out with work that able seamen do. Other tasks include standing lookout, and generally cleaning duties.

=== Engineering officers ===
The engineers are also called technical officers. They are responsible for keeping the ship and the machinery running. Today, ships are complex units that combine a lot of technology within a small space. This includes not only the engine and the propulsion system, but also, for example, the electrical power supply, devices for loading and discharging, garbage incineration and fresh water generators. An engineer is commonly considered a high officer in ranking in the ship.

== Departments ==
The most basic delineation of the crew roles and complement of a ship is by department.

=== Deck department ===
The deck department is an organisational team on board naval and merchant ships. The department and its manning requirements, including the responsibilities of each rank are regulated within the STCW Convention, applicable only to the merchant fleets of countries who have ratified it. The department is led by deck officers, who are licensed mariners, and they are commanded overall by the ship's captain. Seafarers in the deck department work a variety of jobs on a ship or vessel, but primarily they will carry out the navigation of a vessel from the bridge. However, they are usually also responsible for supervising and monitoring any maritime cargo on board, as well as ensuring maintenance of the deck and upper hull structure, monitoring the stability of the ship, including loading and discharging ballast water, carrying out mooring operations, and finally anchoring a ship.

=== Engineering department ===
An engine department or engineering department is an organizational unit aboard a ship that is responsible for the operation, maintenance, and repair of the propulsion systems and the support systems for crew, passengers, and cargo. These include the ship engine, fuel oil, lubrication, water distillation, separation process, lighting, air conditioning, and refrigeration.

The engine department emerged with the arrival of marine engines for propulsion, largely during the later half of the 19th century. Due to advances in marine technology during the 20th century, the engine department aboard merchant ships is considered equally important as the deck department, since trained engine officers are required to handle the machinery on a ship.

The engine department takes care of the engine room aboard a ship. Rotations various depending on the vessel or company. Whoever is on a rotation has to stand watch to look over the engine room and its components. There are different crew members for watch rotation.

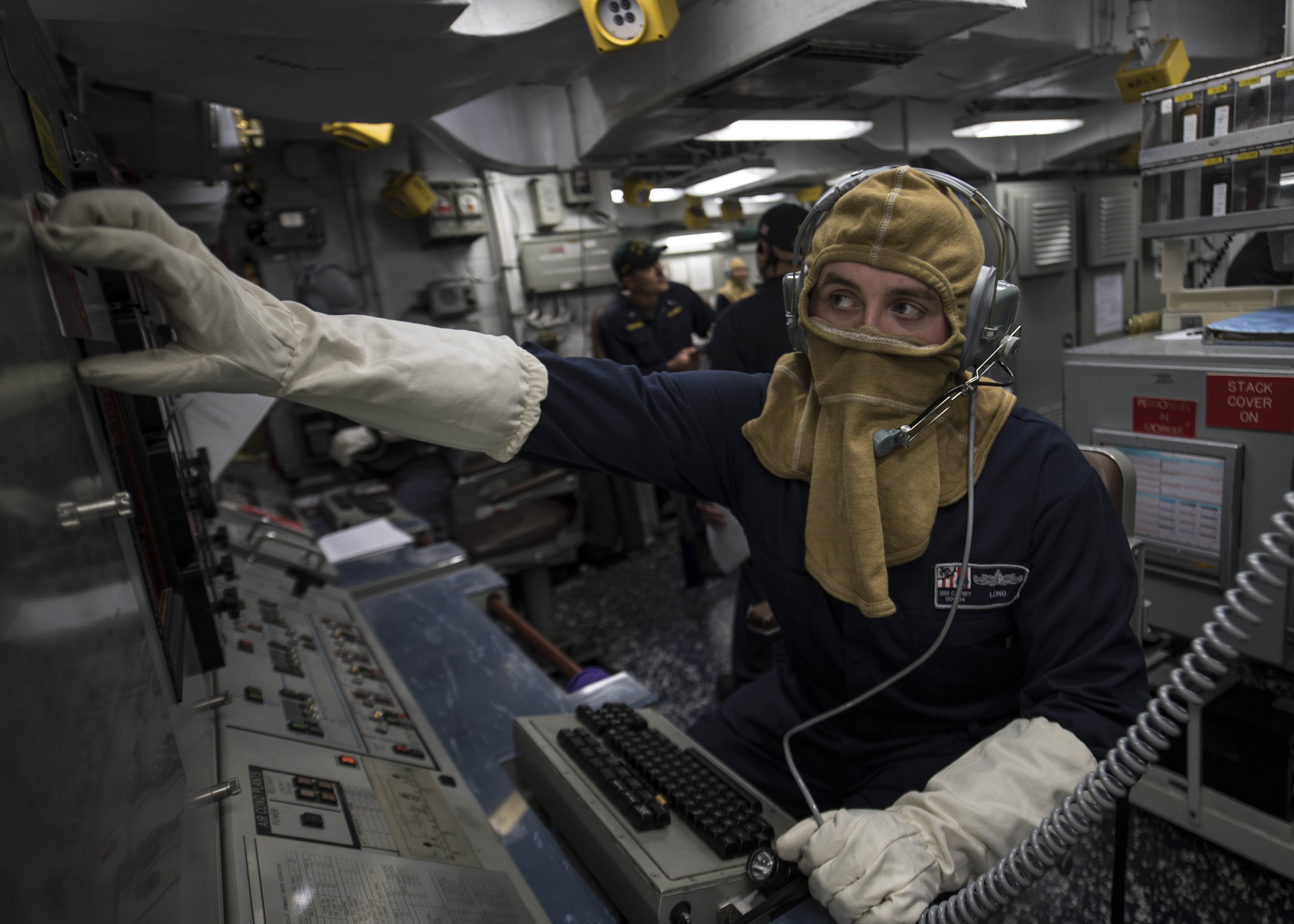
Watch Standing Mate, aboard a naval vessel.

Typically, a ship's engine department is run by the engine officers but staffed with other occupational specialties of the seafarer's trade like:

- Machinist/Fitter: A rating (or petty officer) who is specialized in fabrication, welding, etc.
- Motorman: A, not always, qualified engine rating who stands a watch with the engine officer, as well as performing routine tasks and assisting engine officers during maintenance.
- Oiler: A rating who is responsible for ensuring that machinery is adequately lubricated. Performs menial tasks such as cleaning, sounding tanks etc.
- Wiper: The lowest rating in the engine room and is tasked with keeping the machinery spaces clean and tidy. Wipers usually go on to become oilers once they are familiar with engine room machinery and specific routines.

In order to be a watch officer and have the license for it, there are 3 basic requirements and they are age, seagoing service, and education/training on stcw's. Some basic USCG stcw requirements go further into seagoing service, approved trainings such as; engine resource management, gas/steam turbine plants, control systems, etc., and finally the competencies which include "Evidence of Standard of competence". Additionally, many vessels also carry a specific type of engine officer known as an electro-technical officer.

Defunct positions within the engine department include the fireman, who was a rating responsible for shoveling coal into the boiler furnaces of steam engines, and the coal trimmer, a rating that loaded coal in the bunkers and transported the coal from the bunkers to the firemen.

Nowadays due to the increase in automation on merchant vessels and the increase in the unattended machinery spaces (UMS) aboard them, the number of seafaring engine officers has decreased drastically on board merchant ships.

=== Steward's department ===
The chief steward directs, instructs, and assigns personnel performing such functions as preparing and serving meals; cleaning and maintaining officers' quarters and steward department areas; and receiving, issuing, and inventorying stores. The chief steward also plans menus; compiles supply, overtime, and cost control records. The steward may requisition or purchase stores and equipment. Additional duties may include baking bread, rolls, cakes, pies, and pastries.

==== Chief cook ====
The chief cook is the senior unlicensed crew member working in the steward's department of a ship. His position corresponds to that of the boatswain in the deck department, the pump man in an oil tanker, and the electrician (but not ETO) in the engine department of a container ship or general cargo ship. He is the equivalent to a chief petty officer in the Navy, and equal to a captain rank in the kitchen.

The chief cook directs and participates in the preparation and serving of meals; determines timing and sequence of operations required to meet serving times; inspects galley and equipment for cleanliness and proper storage and preparation of food.

== Historical ==
=== Ancient times ===
In the Hellenistic era, as civilizations around the Mediterranean grew in size and complexity, both their navies and the Hellenistic-era warships such as galleys became successively larger. The basic design of two or three rows of oars remained the same, but more rowers were added to each oar. The exact reasons are not known, but are believed to have been caused by addition of more troops and the use of more advanced ranged weapons on ships, such as catapults. The size of the new naval forces also made it difficult to find enough skilled rowers for the one-man-per-oar system of the earliest triremes. With more than one man per oar, a single rower could set the pace for the others to follow, meaning that more unskilled rowers could be employed.

The successor states of Alexander the Great's empire built galleys that were like triremes or biremes in oar layout, but manned with additional rowers for each oar. The ruler Dionysius I of Syracuse (c. 432–367 BC) is credited with pioneering the "five" and "six", meaning five or six rows of rowers plying two or three rows of oars. Ptolemy II (283–46 BC) is known to have built a large fleet of very large galleys with several experimental designs rowed by everything from 12 up to 40 rows of rowers, though most of these are considered to have been quite impractical. Fleets with large galleys were put in action in conflicts such as the Punic Wars (246–146 BC) between the Roman Republic and Carthage, which included massive naval battles with hundreds of vessels and tens of thousands of soldiers, seamen, and rowers.

Most of the surviving documentary evidence comes from Greek and Roman shipping, though it is likely that merchant galleys all over the Mediterranean were highly similar. In Greek they were referred to as histiokopos ("sail-oar-er") to reflect that they relied on both types of propulsion. In Latin they were called actuaria (navis) ("ship that moves"), stressing that they were capable of making progress regardless of weather conditions. As an example of the speed and reliability, during an instance of the famous "Carthago delenda est" speech, Cato the Elder demonstrated the close proximity of the Roman arch enemy Carthage by displaying a fresh fig to his audience that he claimed had been picked in North Africa only three days past. Other cargoes carried by galleys were honey, cheese, meat, and live animals intended for gladiator combat. The Romans had several types of merchant galleys that specialized in various tasks, out of which the actuaria with up to 50 rowers was the most versatile, including the phaselus (lit. "bean pod") for passenger transport and the lembus, a small-scale express carrier. Many of these designs continued to be used until the Middle Ages.

=== Age of Sail ===
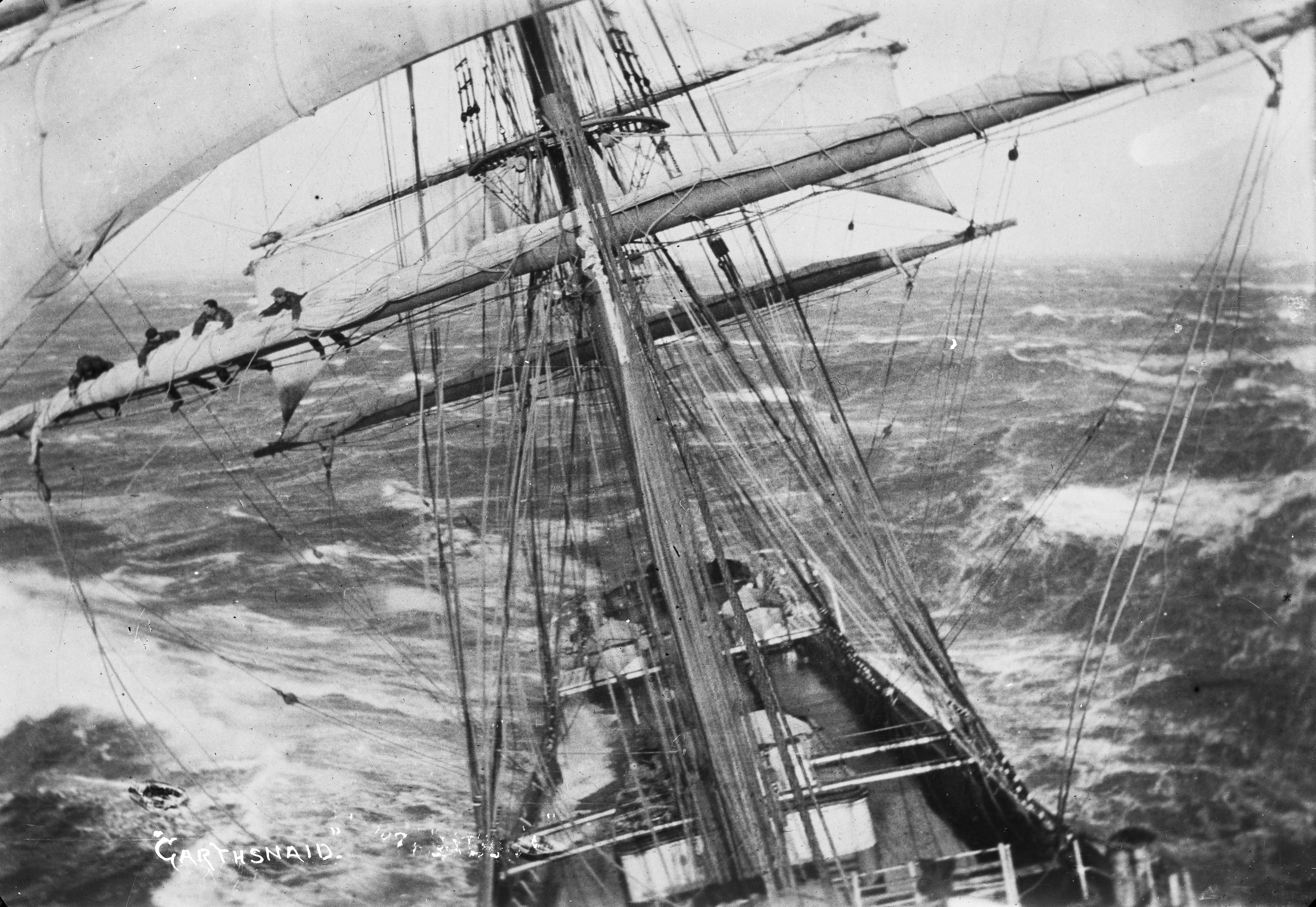
Seamen aloft, shortening sail

The crew of a sailing ship is divided between officers (the captain and his subordinates) and seamen or ordinary hands. An able seaman was expected to "hand, reef, and steer" (handle the lines and other equipment, reef the sails, and steer the vessel). The crew is organized to stand watch—the oversight of the ship for a period—typically four hours each. Richard Henry Dana Jr. and Herman Melville each had personal experience aboard sailing vessels of the 19th century.

==== Merchant vessel ====
Dana described the crew of the merchant brig, Pilgrim, as comprising six to eight common sailors, four specialist crew members (the steward, cook, carpenter and sailmaker), and three officers: the captain, the first mate and the second mate. He contrasted the American crew complement with that of other nations on whose similarly sized ships the crew might number as many as 30. Larger merchant vessels had larger crews.

==== Warship ====
Melville described the crew complement of the frigate warship, United States, as about 500—including officers, enlisted personnel and 50 Marines. The crew was divided into the starboard and larboard watches. It was also divided into three tops, bands of crew responsible for setting sails on the three masts; a band of sheet-anchor men, whose station was forward and whose job was to tend the fore-yard, anchors and forward sails; the after guard, who were stationed aft and tended the mainsail, spanker and man the various sheets, controlling the position of the sails; the waisters, who were stationed midships and had menial duties attending the livestock, etc.; and the holders, who occupied the lower decks of the vessel and were responsible for the inner workings of the ship. He additionally named such positions as, boatswains, gunners, carpenters, coopers, painters, tinkers, stewards, cooks and various boys as functions on the man-of-war. 18-19th century ships of the line had a complement as high as 850.

== Academic studies ==
The highest degree awarded for the specific academic field of "Nautical Operations" is a doctoral degree. Various universities use different terminology to refer to studies relating to this professional field and academic area. One common term is "Marine Operations." Another field of study which relates to this professional area is "Maritime Technology & Operations." One school in Great Britain refers to this degree as "Navigation and Maritime Science."

Another name for studies relating to this professional field and academic area is "Maritime Technology."

The field of "Naval Science" is often used to refer to the training of students to become officers in the navy of a specific country.

== See also ==
- Shipping
- Cargo vessel
