= Vertical circle (instrument) =

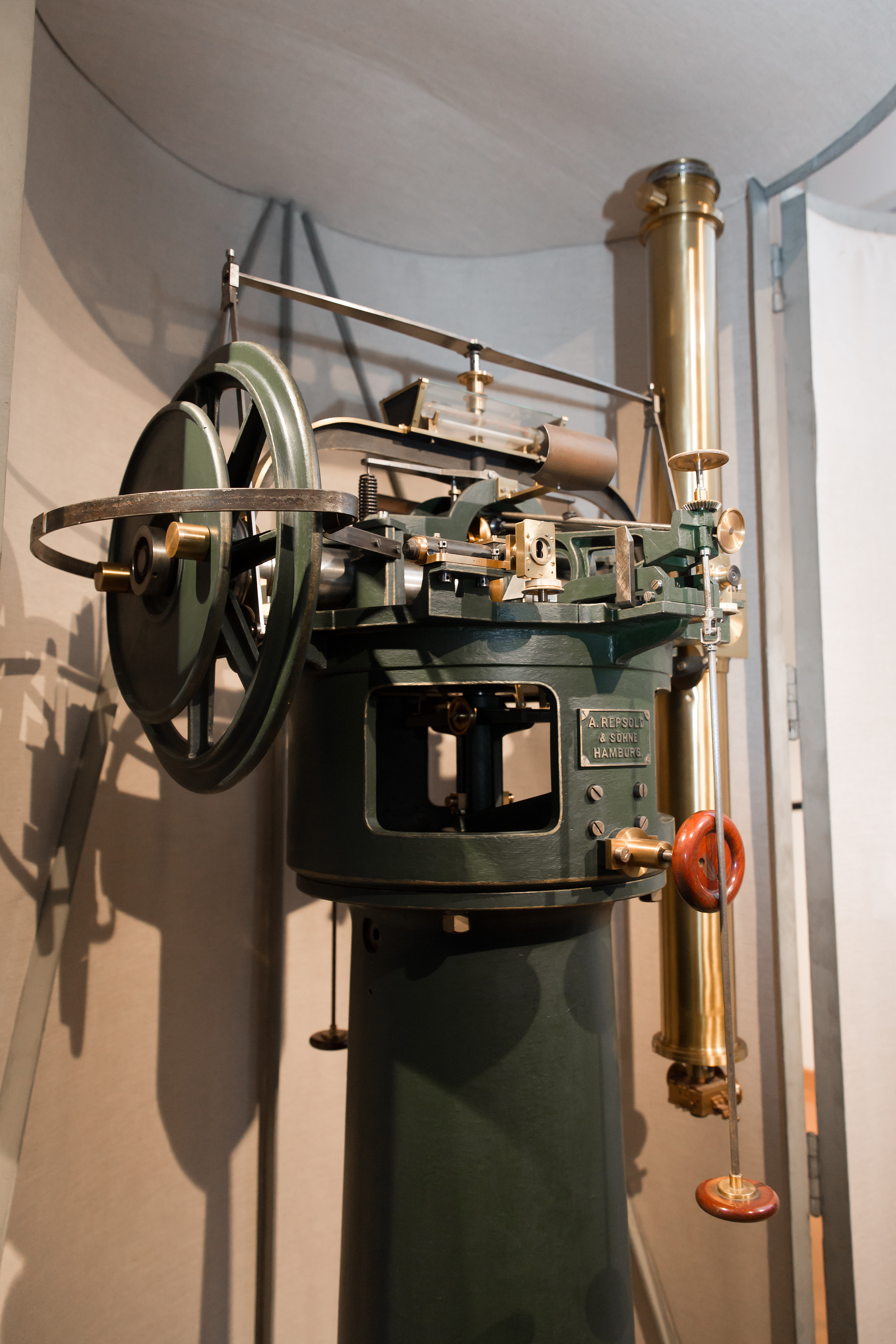
Vertical circle instrument

The vertical circle is an optical instrument used to measure angles in astronomy, which name is derived from the mathematical concept of the vertical circle from spherical geometry. It is a device for measuring astronomical angles, which can be rotated in altitude and azimuth. It consists of a telescope (in astronomical geodesy occasionally also with a reflecting telescope), which is mounted on a horizontal tilting axis and is supported by a stable altazimuth mount. It is similar in design to the meridian circle, but the latter only has a horizontal tilting axis without the means to change azimuth. The angular movements around the tilting and standing axes are measured with large, finely divided circles and a reading microscope.

Instruments like this were more common in 19th century observatories and were important for locating and recording coordinates in the cosmos, and observatories often had various other instruments for certain functions as well as advanced clocks of the period. The popularly known example in the observatories, was the Great Refractors which became larger and larger and came to have a dominating effect to the point that observatories were moved simply to have better conditions for their biggest telescope, in the modern style where observatories often have one instrument only in a remote location on the Earth or even in outer space. However, in the 19th century it was more basic with observatories often making recording of coordinates of different items and to determine the shape of the Earth and times.

== See also ==
- Meridian circle
- Equatorial telescope
- Comet seeker
