= Vertical circle =

Great circle on the celestial sphere that is perpendicular to the horizon

In spherical geometry, a vertical circle is a great circle on the celestial sphere that is perpendicular to the horizon. Therefore, it contains the vertical direction, passing through the zenith and the nadir. There is a vertical circle for any given azimuth, where azimuth is the angle measured east from the north on the celestial horizon. The vertical circle which is in the east–west direction is called the prime vertical. The vertical circle which is on the north–south direction is called the local celestial meridian (LCM), or principal vertical. Vertical circles are part of the horizontal coordinate system.

== See also ==
- Vertical circle (instrument)
