= List of merchant navy capacity by country =

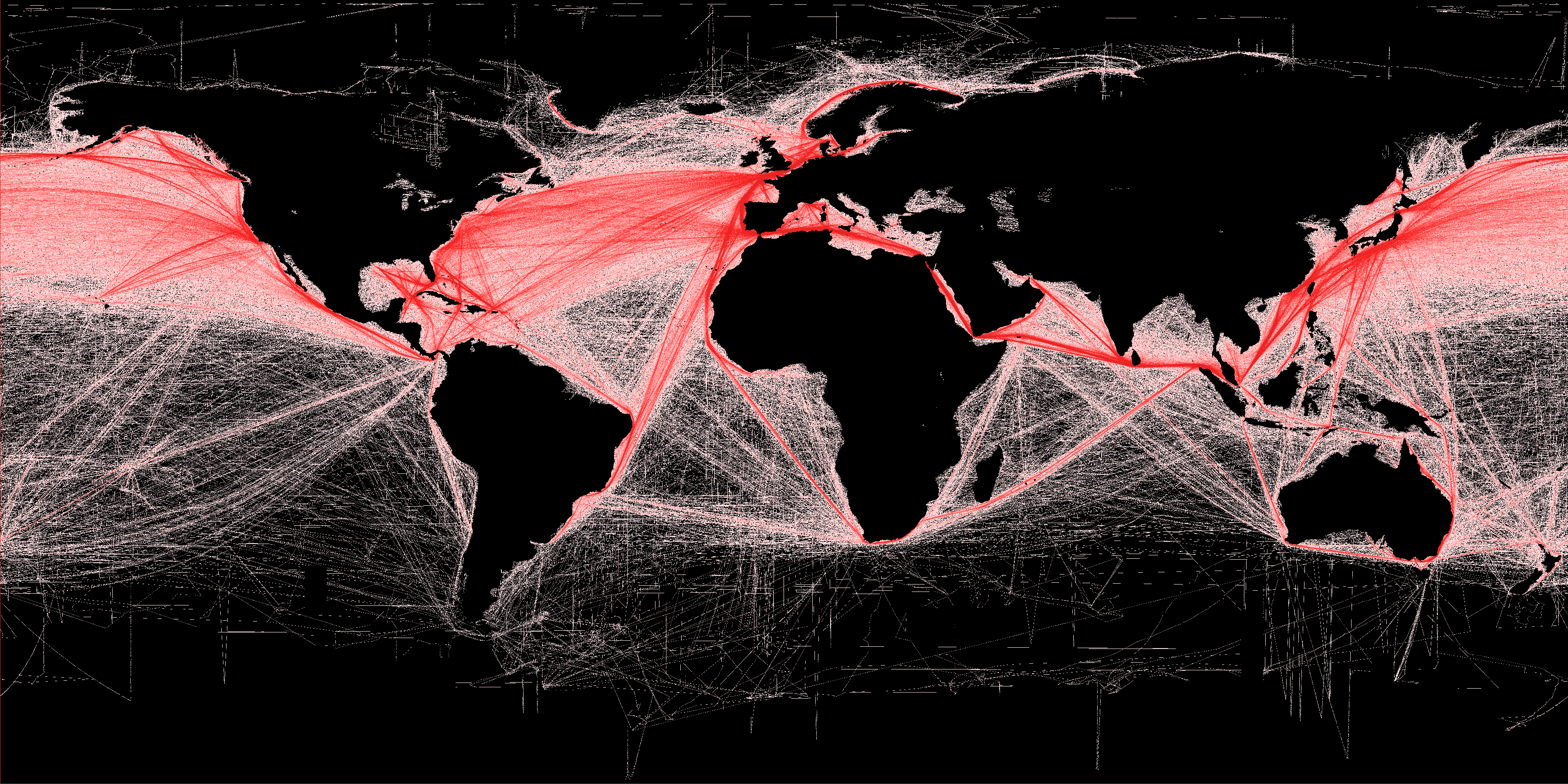
Present-day merchant shipping in the world's oceans

Countries with over 1,000,000 gross tons. Data as of 2025. Data is for flag of registry; many ships are registered under a flag of convenience instead of the country of the owner.

N°	Country (or territory)	Gross tonnage (thousands)	Deadweight tonnage (thousands)
	World	1,658,757	2,427,811
	European Union	245,161	310,225
1	Liberia	272,139	424,063
2	Panama	242,497	371,301
3	Marshall Islands	188,197	305,471
4	Hong Kong (China)	131,912	203,048
5	Singapore	104,682	152,344
6	China	90,351	137,064
7	Malta	86,875	113,194
8	Bahamas	61,956	70,463
9	Greece	32,867	53,459
10	Japan	32,193	43,828
11	Portugal	26,228	35,943
12	Indonesia	24,492	34,251
13	Cyprus	23,443	34,297
14	Denmark	22,864	25,641
15	Norway	19,670	21,354
16	South Korea	17,766	21,461
17	Italy	12,536	7,226
18	Iran	12,034	21,080
19	Russian Federation	11,941	14,786
20	Isle of Man	11,766	19,935
21	United States	11,504	13,244
22	India	11,083	18,021
23	Barbados	10,930	18,719
24	France	10,155	9,943
25	Bermuda (UK)	10,125	6,737
26	United Kingdom	9,650	10,327
27	Saudi Arabia	9,609	17,445
28	Germany	8,661	8,711
29	Malaysia	8,112	9,773
30	Viet Nam	7,190	11,666
31	Netherlands	6,576	6,777
32	Antigua and Barbuda	6,509	9,414
33	Turkey	5,308	6,842
34	Palau	5,088	7,732
35	Nigeria	4,467	7,156
36	Belgium	4,434	6,874
37	Taiwan	4,366	5,901
38	Brazil	4,210	5,922
39	Philippines	4,075	5,626
40	Bangladesh	3,519	6,019
41	Saint Kitts and Nevis	3,462	5,072
42	Cayman Islands (UK)	3,405	5,531
43	Sierra Leone	3,367	5,476
44	Guyana	3,257	6,140
45	Cameroon	3,222	5,625
46	Thailand	3,015	4,635
47	Gabon	2,921	5,197
48	Canada	2,909	3,305
49	Cook Islands	2,799	4,821
50	Kuwait	2,708	4,739
51	Curacao	2,598	4,149
52	Belize	2,551	4,056
53	Comoros	2,504	4,052
54	Sweden	2,320	1,142
55	Spain	2,285	1,601
56	Australia	2,093	2,410
57	Saint Vincent and the Grenadines	1,980	2,681
58	Djibouti	1,846	3,473
59	Tanzania	1,827	2,758
60	Finland	1,765	1,005
61	Mexico	1,715	2,228
62	Honduras	1,532	2,674
63	Egypt	1,289	1,935
64	Luxembourg	1,283	1,636
65	San Marino	1,211	2,118
66	Guinea	1,190	2,148
67	Tuvalu	1,153	1,665
68	Sao Tome and Principe	1,130	2,051
69	Azerbaijan	1,074	1,215
70	Vanuatu	1,032	1,241

== See also ==
- Ship registration
- Merchant Navy (United Kingdom)
