= Prime vertical =

Celestial coordinate system

In astronomy, astrology, and geodesy, the prime vertical or first vertical is the vertical circle passing east and west through the zenith of a specific location, and intersecting the horizon in its east and west points. In other words, the prime vertical is the vertical circle perpendicular to the meridian, and passes through the east and west points, zenith, and nadir of any place.

A heavenly body is in or on the prime vertical when it bears true east or true west—when it is at right angles to the meridian. When a body is observed on the prime vertical for the purpose of calculating the longitude, a considerable error in the latitude by dead-reckoning (used in the computation) will not appreciably affect the result. By this it will be understood that the best time to observe a longitude sight (be it sun, moon, planet, or star) is when the body is on the prime vertical; but it is to be explained that it is not always possible to obtain such an observation, for a heavenly body can only be true east or true west when its declination is of the same name as the ship's latitude and less than the latter. When the declination of the body is of the same name but greater than the ship's latitude, the body's nearest approach will be some time after it has risen; but when the declination is of a contrary nature to the latitude, the body will be the nearest to the prime vertical at its rising and setting.

== See also ==
- Earth radius#Prime vertical
- Meridian (astronomy)
