= Steward's assistant =

Merchant ship crewman

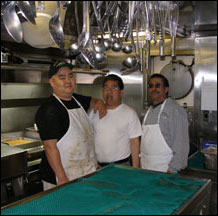
- A steward's assistant works closely with the chief cook and chief steward.

General
- Other names: Waiter, messman, galley utilityman, GS.
- Department: Steward's department
- Reports to: Chief steward, Chief cook
- Duties: Food handler, cleaning, stocking.
- Requirements: Merchant Mariner's Document or equivalent.

Watchstanding
- Watchstander: No

A steward's assistant (SA) is an unlicensed, entry-level crewmember in the Steward's department of a merchant ship. This position can also be referred to as steward (the usual term on British ships), galley utilityman, messman, supply, waiter or General Steward (GS).

The role of the steward's assistant consists mainly of stocking, cleaning and assisting with the preparation and serving of meals.

The steward's assistant often assists the steward by removing stocks such as food, linen, and utensils and making sure they arrive where they're needed. Closely involved with the storeroom operations, the steward's assistant will assist in taking inventory. The steward's assistant also is typically in charge of the ship's linens, not only sorting, counting, and stocking but also issuing them to the crew.

The steward's assistant is a foodhandler, and perhaps most visible while assisting the chief cook with the serving of meals. Depending on the ship, this can include taking orders and delivering the food to the tables in the ship's messroom and officer's saloon. The steward's assistant also customarily sets out the "night lunches" for watchstanders preparing to start late-night watches, as well as setting and clearing tables.

A ship's galley, pantry, and eating areas are notoriously hard to keep clean and sanitary, and this activity keeps the steward's assistant busy for much of his time. The steward's assistant must clean the ship's mess and officer's saloon, and the gear in both. This includes keeping the decks clean by sweeping and scrubbing. The steward's assistant disposes of trash and keeps garbage cans clean. Other tasks could include defrosting and cleansing refrigerators, cleaning brightwork and woodwork, and removing grease and finger marks from paintwork.

Depending on the ship and crewing, the steward's assistant may be responsible for other cleaning duties, such as stairways and passageways, laundry rooms, refrigerated spaces, storerooms, linen lockers, the ship's office, the radio room and any other areas assigned to the steward's department. A steward's assistant may be responsible for making up bunks and cleaning rooms, toilets, and showers of officers and others.

In order to be occupied as a steward's assistant in the United States Merchant Marine, a person has to have a Merchant Mariner's Document issued by the United States Coast Guard. Because of international conventions and agreements, all steward's assistants who sail internationally are similarly documented by their respective countries.

== See also ==
- Seafarer's professions and ranks
- Cabin boy, the pre-20th century precursor to the modern steward's assistant
