= Ramón María Aller Ulloa =

Galician astronomer (1878-1966)

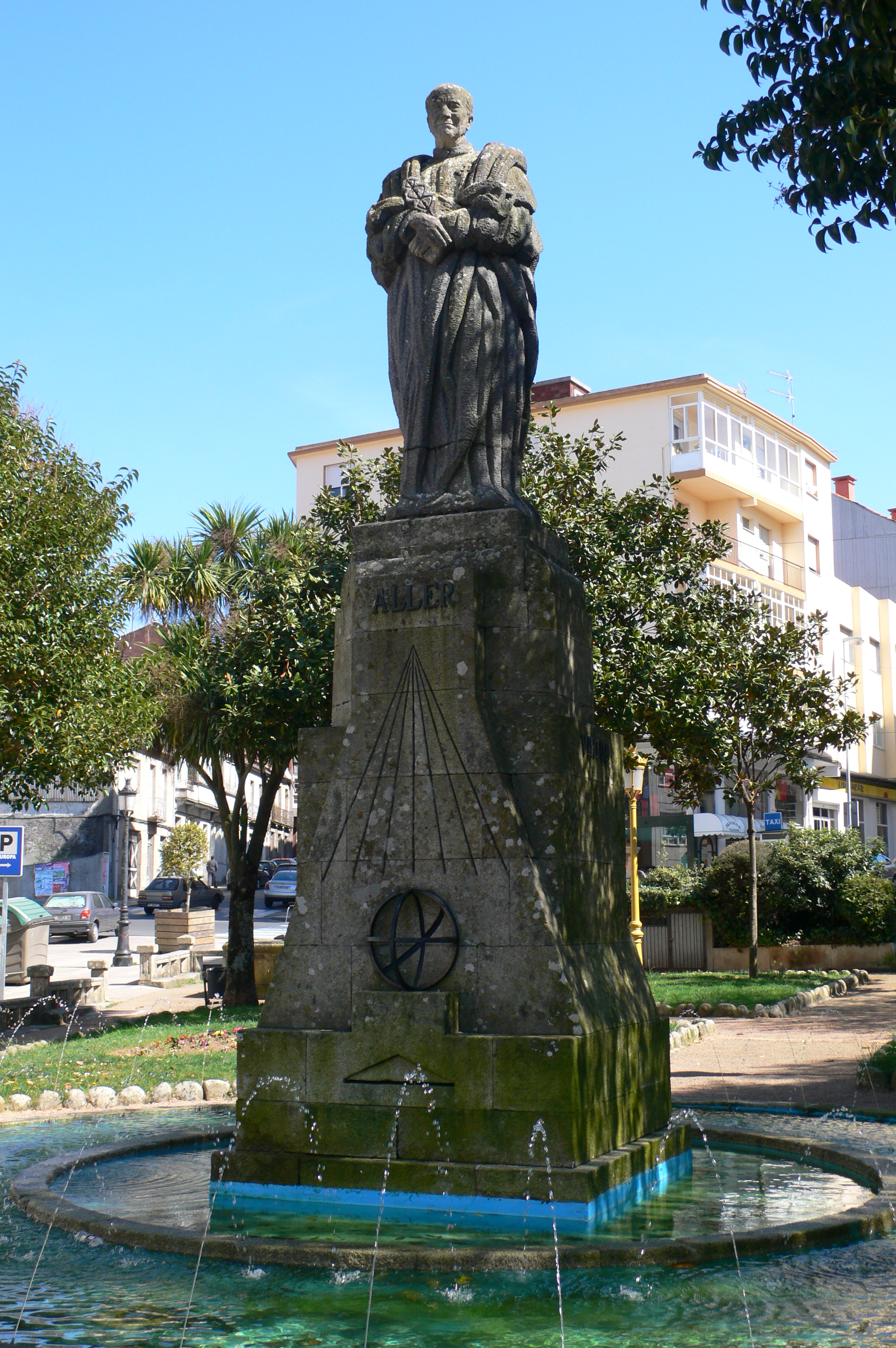
- Statue built in Lalín by the sculptor Francisco Asorey
- Born: 3 February 1878; Donramiro, Spain
- Died: 28 March 1966; Lalín, Spain
- Education: University of Madrid PhD, University of Oviedo BS

Ramón María Aller Ulloa (1878–1966) was a Galician astronomer, mathematician and Catholic priest, professor of geometry and mathematical analysis at University of Santiago de Compostela, in 1944 the University created and assigned to him the first chair in astronomy, as well he was a member of the Spanish Royal Academy of Sciences. Aller Ulloa was a specialist in Double stars discovering 4 of them named after him (Aller1, Aller2, Aller3 and Aller4) and inventor of several devices used for measurements and observation.

== Biography ==
He began his studies on the school owned by the Society of Jesus in the city of A Guarda (Pontevedra), to continue in the theological seminary of Lugo. While being only 20 years old he obtained his bachelor and doctorate in Sacred Theology and so he was ordered priest within the next two years. In 1899 he started science studies in the University of Oviedo, finishing them in the University of Madrid in 1904 graduating with honours. His first astronomical studies began with a present of his grandmother, a monocular of 67mm. Later on, as a second present, he received a theodolite, which improved his first observations. With these first two simple devices he started writing his home observations and mailing them to scientific publications. It is on 1912 when the "Anuario del Observatorio de Madrid" published his first paper "Observaciones del cometa de Joannesburgo 1910a". In 1917 he built a homemade observatory on his garden. With the inheritance of his passed uncle he decided to acquire a refracting telescope Steinheil of 120 mm. aperture and 1800 mm. focal length. Due to the size of all his new equipment he needed to acquire a dome to protect it. Straight after his new device arrived he prepared a detailed scientific program to optimise its results in the observation of his new interests, double stars, exams of planet surfaces and a last phase of "occasional observations" as eclipses, comets or meteoroids. From this point his scientific publications grow substantially, with publications in the German "Astronomische Nachrichten" and the French "L'Astranomie". Due to the good quality of the data received in several European observatories assumed that in Lalín existed a team of researches, ignoring that the data was coming from a homemade observatory and a single scientist.

Aller Ulloa was recognized by his European counterparts as polyglot, speaking 10 different languages. In 1928 he was elected as a member in the Seminario de Estudos Galegos, in 1939 a member of the Spanish Royal Academy of Sciences. From 1940 he began teaching analytic geometry and mathematical analysis in the University of Santiago de Compostela (USC), in 1942 he joined the Royal Galician Academy. In 1943 he receives his second PhD, this time in astronomy by the University of Madrid.

He died at Lalín at the age of 88.

== Scientific findings ==
Aller Ulloa discovered 4 double stars:

1. Aller 1 (2000.0): 21 55.9 + 19 47, Mag: 9,3 – 9,5;
2. Aller 2 (2000.0): 00 34.5 – 04 33 AB-D, Mag: 6,8 – 8,8;
3. Aller 3 (2000.0): 18 59,3 + 03 31 AB, Mag: 8,9 – 9,1;
4. Aller 4 (2000.0): 17 57.8 + 27 50, Mag: 8,9 – 9,9.

Moreover, he is recognized as the first Spanish in calculating the orbit of a double star system in the country, the STT 77. It follows the appointment of Aller as a member of the “International Astronomical Union Commission 26 (double stars)” in 1948 (Zurich). The following year he was named a member of the National Commission on Astronomy. The professor Aller Ulloa also designed and built devices for measuring and observation purchased by the Paris Observatory; he suggested modifications on the production of the astrograph to the German manufacture Zeiss, which accepted them and afterwards did not accept the payment of Aller Ulloa for the device as appreciation for the improvements; a clock of sidereal time; a base for the portable vertical circle monocular, etc...

Contistuted by his two main research lines double stars and the methods to determine coordinates based on two vertical lanes he published 78 articles in especialized publications in Europe, 4 books and he directed 5 PhD thesis (Between 1960 and 1963, in spite of being 83 years old, Aller still directed three theses: Múgica Buhigas's “ber die Anwendung des Theodolits in der Geodtischen Astronomia” (Munich, 1960); Zaera de Toledo's “On determining the Orbits of Visual Double Stars. A Study of Various Methods. Applications” (Zaragoza, 1962); and Ferrín Moreiras’ “Observations of Transits Across Two Vertical Circles” (Santiago, 1963)) As secondary topics he studied and published about meteors, planet surfaces, tooling, auroras (describing one visible in Lalín in 1938 ), eclipses, transits, details on the construction of his homemade observatories, biographies, as the one for the mathematician José Rodríguez González, etc...

== Moon crater ==
The English astronomers Hugh Percy Wilkins and Patrick Moore, specialized on moon observations, named a Lunar crater "Aller". On their book The moon published on 1955 they place it at : 5.8°S, Longitude: 57.7°E. Nevertheless, the current name of the crater is named in honour of the English mathematician George Atwood, it was introduced provisionally by this name on 1974 and it was adopted officially by the IAU on 1976, today the crater is known as Atwood.

The crater is inside the Mare Fecunditatis 5.8°S 57.7°E, with a diameter of 28,64 km and 2,5 km depth.
