= Purser =

Person on a ship responsible for handling money

General
- Other names: Clerk of burser; in-flight service manager
- Department: Purser's Office
- Reports to: Captain
- Licensed: Yes
- Duties: in modern times, they manage passenger interactions, visas, immigration, ship's payroll
- Requirements: Administration and logistics training

Watchstanding
- Watchstander: No

A purser is the person on a ship principally responsible for the handling of money on board. On modern merchant ships, the purser is the officer responsible for all administration (including the ship's cargo and passenger manifests) and supply. Frequently, the cooks and stewards answer to the purser as well. They were also called a pusser in British naval slang.

== History ==
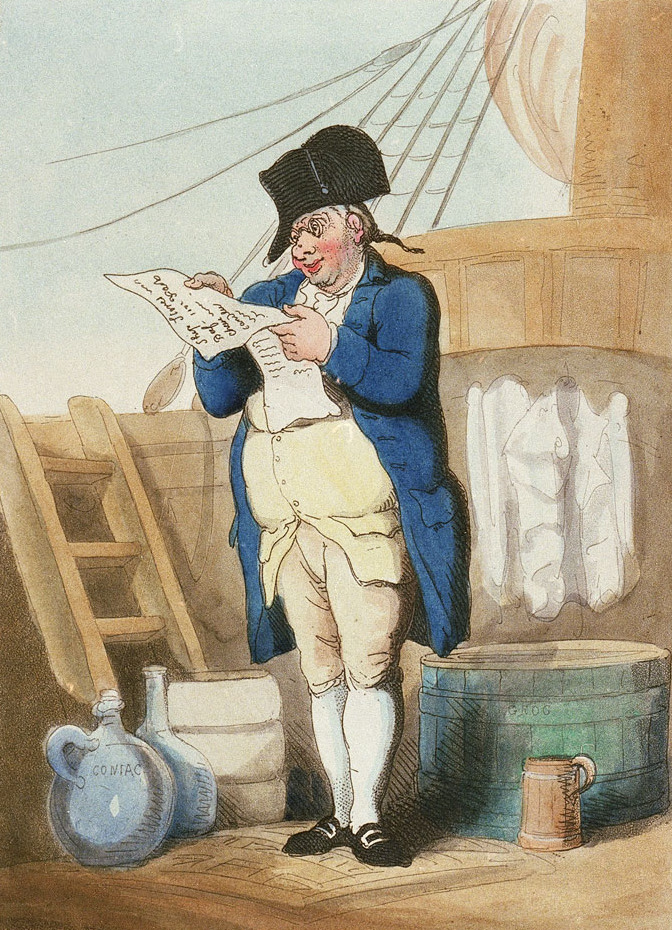
1799 illustration of a Royal Navy purser

The purser joined the warrant officer ranks of the Royal Navy in the early 14th century and existed as a naval rank until 1852. The development of the warrant officer system began in 1040, when five English ports began furnishing warships to King Edward the Confessor in exchange for certain privileges. They also furnished crews whose officers were the master, boatswain, carpenter and cook. Later these officers were "warranted" by the British Admiralty. Pursers received no pay but were entitled to profits earned through their business activities. In the 18th century, a purser would buy his warrant for £65 and was required to post sureties totalling £2,100 with the admiralty. The pursers maintained and sailed the ships and were the standing officers of the navy, staying with the ships in port between voyages as caretakers supervising repairs and refitting.

c. 1807 portrait of a Royal Navy purser

In charge of supplies such as food and drink, clothing, bedding and candles, the purser was originally known as "the clerk of burser." The burser would usually charge the supplier a 5% commission for making a purchase and often charged a considerable markup when the purser resold the goods to the crew. The purser was not in charge of pay, but he had to track it closely, as the crew was required to pay for all of their supplies, and it was the purser's job to deduct those expenses from their wages. The purser bought everything (except food and drink) on credit, acting as an unofficial private merchant. In addition to his official responsibilities, it was customary for the purser to act as an official private merchant for luxuries such as tobacco and to serve as the crew's banker.

As a result, the purser could be at risk of losing money and being confined to debtor's prison. It was the common practice of pursers forging pay tickets to claim wages for nonexistent crew members that led to the navy's implementation of muster inspection to confirm the workers on a vessel. The position, though unpaid, was very desirable because of the expectation of realizing a reasonable profit, and although there were wealthy pursers, their money originated from side businesses facilitated by their ships' travels.

On modern-day passenger ships, the purser is not part of the steward's department. The purser's office operates the monetary office aboard the ship and interacts with the passengers. The purser handles the visas and passports of passengers and crewmembers, also preparing papers for all ports and customs services along the way. The purser also works with their home-port immigration office for incoming and outgoing crew and passengers, requiring the purser to know and understand the rules for many nations. Most purser's offices also handle the payroll for the ship's crew and officers and oversee financial operations such as casino counts. The chief purser is often promoted to the rank of hotel manager, which is equal in status with staff captain and chief engineer on many vessels.

== Aircraft ==
On modern airliners, the cabin manager (chief flight attendant) is often called the purser. The purser oversees the flight attendants by ensuring that passengers are safe and comfortable. A flight purser completes detailed reports and verifies that all safety procedures are followed.

In the United Kingdom and the Middle East, such term refers to a flight attendant in charge of each cabin, with the chief flight attendant designated as the cabin services director.

== See also ==
- Neerja Bhanot, purser on Pan Am Flight 73
- Bursar, etymological cognate used in an academic context
- Samuel Hambleton (naval officer), the first purser of the United States Navy
- Navy Supply Corps
