= Chief steward =

Ranks on a merchant ship

Chief Steward
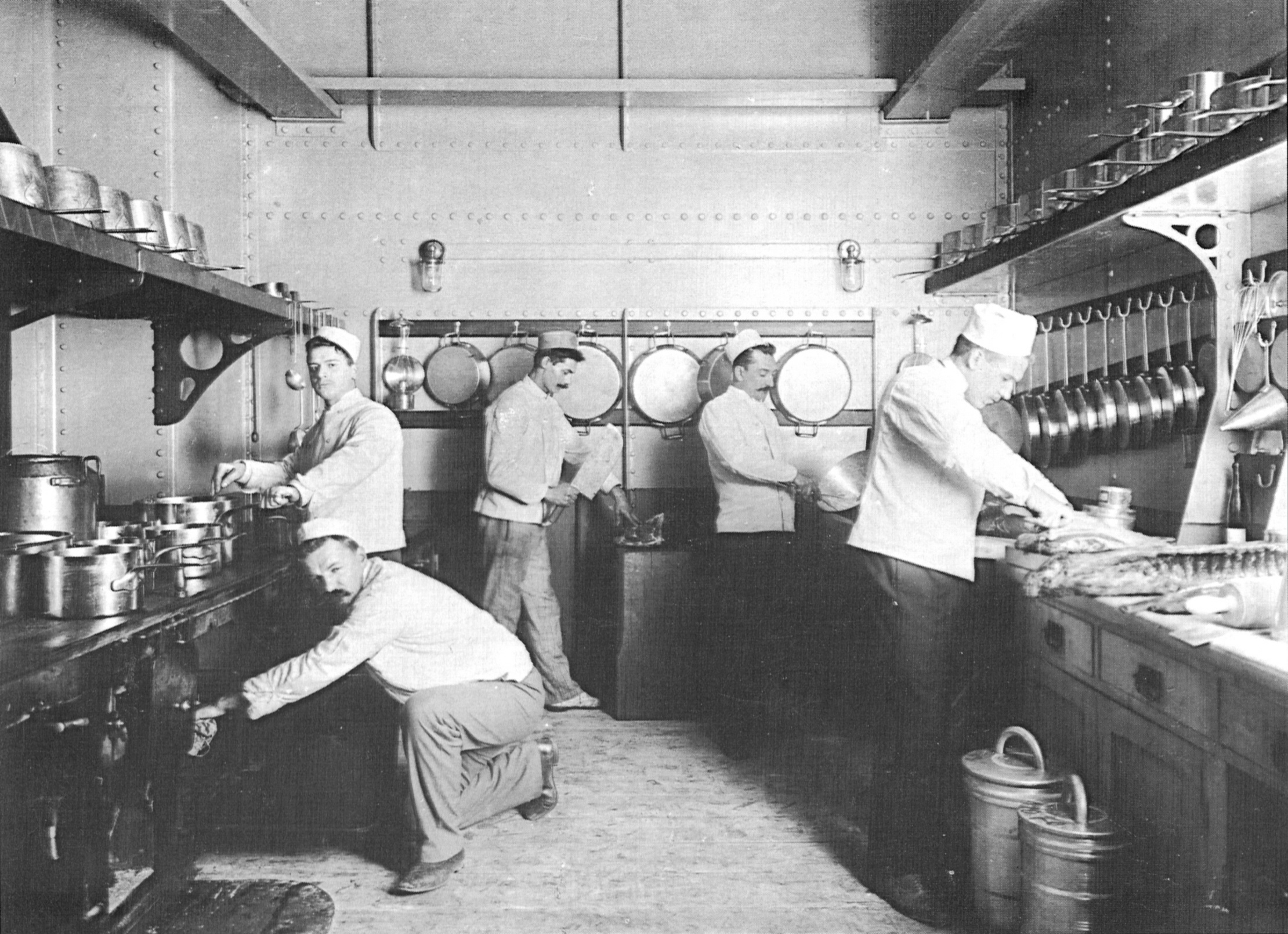
- Galley of the Austrian passenger ship S.S. Africa in the Mediterranean sea circa 1905.

General
- Other names: Steward
- Department: Steward's department
- Reports to: Captain, or purser (if carried)
- Duties: Directs cooking, cleaning, orders stores
- Requirements: Specialized kitchen training

Watchstanding
- Watchstander: No

A chief steward is the senior crew member working in the steward's department of a ship. Since there is no purser on most ships in the United States Merchant Marine, the steward is the senior person in the department, whence its name. In the British Merchant Navy, a steward is a junior member of the department (referred to as a steward's assistant in the United States), and so the term "chief steward" is always used for the senior member.

The chief steward directs, instructs, and assigns personnel performing such functions as preparing and serving meals, ensuring that they are both delicious and nutritious. Moreover, the steward oversees cleaning and maintaining officers' quarters and steward department areas; and receiving, issuing, and inventorying stores.

The chief steward also plans menus, compiles supply, overtime, and cost control records. The steward may also requisition or purchase stores and equipment. Other duties may include baking bread and pastries.

A chief steward's duties may overlap with those of the Steward's Assistant, the Chief Cook, and other Steward's Department crew members.

In the United States Merchant Marine, in order to be occupied as a chief steward a person has to have a Merchant Mariner's Document issued by the United States Coast Guard. Because of international conventions and agreements, all chief cooks who sail internationally are similarly documented by their respective countries.

Chief stewards on large passenger vessels can be considered to be officers.

== See also ==
- Seafarer's professions and ranks
- Galley (kitchen)
- Homemaker
