= Deck cadet =

Apprentice learning deck officer duties

A deck cadet or trainee navigational deck officer or nautical apprentice is an apprentice who has the responsibility for the safe navigation including the basic duties of a deck officer on board a ship. The cadet has to complete the prescribed sea-time obtain a certificate of competency as officer in charge of a navigational watch. The cadet has to undergo various training onboard and has to document those in training record book. They have to undergo various forms of training, watch-keeping with chief officer, at port with second mate and normal deck jobs with the Bosun.

In the UK, it is possible to train as a deck cadet on a Foundation degree programme.

== Minimum certifications prior onboard training ==
There are certain certifications which is mandatory. some STCW certificates are generic and some are type specific.

- Basic safety training (VI/1)
1. Personal survival techniques previous five
2. Fire prevention and fire fighting years
3. Elementary first aid
4. Personal safety and social responsibility

If the cadet has designated security duties.

- Seafarer with designated security duties.

If the cadet has to do onboard training on oil or chemical tanker.

- Oil and chemical tanker familiarisation.

If the cadet has to do onboard training on Liquefied gas tanker.

- Liquefied gas tanker familiarisation.

== General requirements for obtaining a Certificate of competency ==
=== Seagoing service ===
The cadet must have approved seagoing service for not less than one year as part of an accredited training program, which includes training onboard along with an accredited training record book. If not, the cadet must have authorized a seagoing service for not less than 36 months.

=== Bridge watchkeeping ===
The cadet must have performed watchkeeping duties in Bridge during the required service, bridge watchkeeping activities under the supervision of the master or a trained officer for not less than six months.

=== Education and training ===
The cadet must have completed the period of approved education as well training and meeting the competency level specified in section A-II / 1 of the STCW Code.
