= Seafarer's professions and ranks =

Overview of marine occupations

Seafaring is a tradition that encompasses a variety of professions and ranks. Each of these roles carries unique responsibilities that are integral to the successful operation of a seafaring vessel. A ship's crew can generally be divided into four main categories: the deck department, the engineering department, the steward's department, and other. The reasoning behind this is that a ship's bridge, filled with sophisticated navigational equipment, requires skills differing from those used on deck operations – such as berthing, cargo and/or military devices – which in turn requires skills different from those used in a ship's engine room and propulsion, and so on.

The following is only a partial listing of professions and ranks. Ship operators have understandably employed a wide variety of positions, given the vast array of technologies, missions, and circumstances that ships have been subjected to over the years.

There are some notable trends in modern or twenty-first century seamanship. Usually, seafarers work on board a ship between three and six years. Afterwards, they are well prepared for working in the European maritime industry ashore. Generally, there are some differences between naval and civilian seafarers. One example is nationality on merchant vessels, which is usually diverse and not identical like on military craft. As a result, special cross-cultural training is required – especially with regard to a lingua franca. Another notable trend is that administrative work has increased considerably on board, partly as an effect of increased focus on safety and security. A study shows that due to this development certain skills are missing and some are desired, so that a new degree of flexibility and job sharing has arisen, as the workload of each crew member also increases.

== Modern ship's complement ==
=== Deck Department ===
==== Deck officers ====
Deck officers are licensed mariners who are responsible for the navigation and safe passage of the ship. Since the first half of the 20th century, the official ranks in the British Merchant Navy and others have usually been the captain, chief officer, second officer and third officer along with the deck cadet who is the officer under training.

==== Captain ====
The captain or master is the deck officer, acting on behalf of the ship's owner. When a ship has a third mate, the captain does not stand watch.

The captain is responsible for the day-to-day affairs of the ship under their command. It is their responsibility to ensure that all the international laws are followed. They take care of the safety of crew members and the ship.

==== Chief mate ====
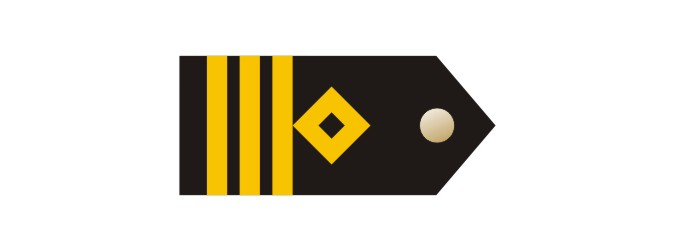
Epaulettes worn by the chief officer on merchant ships (similar to those worn by a commander in the Commonwealth navies)

The chief mate is the head of the deck department on a merchant's vessel, second-in-command after the ship's master. The chief mate's primary responsibilities are the vessel's cargo operations, its stability, and supervising the deck crew. The mate is responsible for the safety and security of the ship, as well as the welfare of the crew on board. The chief mate typically stands the 4–8 navigation watch as officer-in-charge of the navigational watch (OICNW), directing the bridge team. Some crews have additional third mates, which allow the chief mate to not stand navigational watch, and focus more on cargo and deck operations. Additional duties include maintenance of the ship's hull, cargo gears, accommodations, life-saving appliances, and firefighting appliances. The chief mate also trains the crew and cadets on various aspects like safety, firefighting, search and rescue, and other contingencies. The chief officer assumes command of the whole ship in the absence or incapacitation of the master.

==== Second mate ====
The second mate is a qualified OICNW watch stander, directing the bridge team and navigating the ship. The second mate is the third most-experienced deck department officer after the captain/master and chief mate. The second mate's primary duty is navigational, which includes updating charts and publications, keeping them current, making passage plans, and all aspects of ship navigation. The second mate's other duties may include directing line handlers, cargo watches, directing anchor detail and training and instructing crew members.

==== Third mate ====
The third officer is a qualified OICNW watch-stander, junior to the second mate. When on navigational watch, the third mate directs the bridge team, maneuvering the vessel, keeping it safe and on track. The third mate's primary duty is matters of safety, inspecting gear lockers, lifeboats, and all equipment on board ensuring that it is safe and operational. Other duties include directing line handlers, cargo watches, directing anchor details and training and instructing crew members. They are normally part of the command team during emergencies and drills. The third mate typically stands the 0800 to 1200 hrs and 2000 to 0000 hrs navigation watch as OICNW, directing the bridge team.

==== Deck cadet ====
A deck cadet or trainee navigational officer or nautical apprentice is an apprentice who has to learn the basic duties of a deck officer on board a ship. Deck cadets after sufficient sea time and exams attain certificate of competency of OICNW.

==== Deck ratings ====
Mariners without a certificate of competence are called ratings. They assist in all other tasks that can arise during a voyage. This includes for example, mooring, cleaning of the ship and its holds and repairing broken lines and ropes. These are physically challenging jobs and have to be done regardless of the weather.

===== Boatswain =====
The boatswain is the highest-ranking unlicensed (rating) in the deck department. The boatswain generally carries out the tasks instructed by the chief mate, directing the able seamen and ordinary seamen. The boatswain generally does not stand a navigational watch.

===== Able seaman =====
An able seaman (AB) works under the boatswain, completing tasks such as working mooring lines, operating deck gear, standing anchor details, and working cargo. An able seaman also stands a navigational watch, generally as a lookout or helmsman.

===== Ordinary seaman =====
The lowest-ranking personnel in the deck department. An ordinary seaman (OS) generally helps out with work that able seamen do. Other tasks include standing lookout, and generally cleaning duties.

=== Engine department ===
==== Engineering officers ====
The engineers are also called technical officers. They are responsible for keeping the ship and the machinery running. Today, ships are complex units that combine a lot of technology within a small space. This includes not only the engine and the propulsion system, but also, for example, the electrical power supply, devices for loading and discharging, garbage incineration and fresh water generators. An engineer is commonly considered a high ranking officer on the ship.

===== Chief engineer =====
The chief engineer on a merchant vessel is the official title of someone qualified to oversee the engine department. The qualification for this position is colloquially called a "chief's ticket".

The chief engineer, commonly referred to as "The chief", or just "chief", is responsible for all operations and maintenance that have to do with all machinery and equipment throughout the ship. The chief engineer is the highest ranking officer in the engineering department and in rank they are same as the ship’s captain. chief engineer and captain both are top of the ladder officers on ship. As both a heading different departments it is very important that they have a mutual understanding between each other.

===== Second engineer =====
The second engineer or first assistant engineer is the officer responsible for supervising the daily maintenance and operation of the engine department. The second engineer reports directly to the chief engineer and is the executive head of the ECR (engine control room)

===== Third engineer =====
The third engineer or second assistant engineer is usually in charge of boilers, fuel, auxiliary engines, condensate and feed systems, and is the third most senior marine engineer on board. Depending on usage, "the second" or "the third" is also typically in charge of fueling (a.k.a. bunkering), granted the officer holds a valid person in charge (PIC) endorsement for fuel transfer operations.

===== Fourth engineer =====
The fourth engineer or third assistant engineer is junior to the second assistant engineer/third engineer in the engine department.

===== Trainee marine engineer =====
Trainee marine engineer or engine cadet is a student or apprentice in training to become an engineering officer, usually as part of a study program with a maritime college.

==== Engine ratings / unlicensed ====
===== Motorman =====
The motorman is an unlicensed member of the engine department, same requirement with the oiler both having the Able Seafarer Engine (ABE) certificate STCW A-III/5.

===== Oiler =====
The oiler is an unlicensed member of the engine department, with more experience than a wiper and having the Able Seafarer Engine certificate STCW A-III/5.

===== Wiper =====
The wiper is an unlicensed member of the engine department, usually with the least experience and having the Engine Room Watch Rating (ERWR) certificate STCW A-III/4.

=== Electro-technical department ===
==== Electro-technical officer ====
The electro-technical officer, sometimes referred to as the electrical engineer, is in charge of all the electrical systems on the ship. The electrical engineer is one of the most vital positions in the technical hierarchy of a ship, and the engineer is responsible for their assigned work under the chief engineer's instructions.

Unlike engineers, the ETO does not carry out an assigned engine room watch. Instead, the electrical engineer is normally on call 24 hours a day, and generally works a daily shift carrying out electrical and electronic maintenance, repairs, installations, and testing.

Some shipping companies do not carry electrical officers on their ship to cut down manning cost, and the electrical duties are carried out by an engineer. This is usually the third engineer. However, many companies realized that electrical and electronic systems require some extra attention and therefore require an expert to attend them. This is especially true on diesel electric ships or vessels equipped with systems such as dynamic positioning.

On larger vessels such as cruise ships, electro-technical officers can have ranks within their profession. Such position names include: lead ETO, first electrician, chief electrical officer, or chief electrical engineer. In this situation, the highest ranked electro-technical officer will report directly to the chief engineer. On special class ships such as FPSOs, the electro-technical officer can sometimes earn nearly the same wage as a chief engineer due to the complexity of the electrical systems on the ship.

As technology advances, more automation and electronic circuits are replacing conventional and electrical systems. The International Maritime Organisation (IMO) amended STCW 95 (also known as the Manila Amendment) on June 25, 2010, to introduce the certified position of electro-technical officer in place of electrical officer.

With advancements in satellite communications leading to the widespread adoption of the Global Maritime Distress and Safety System the old position of radio officer is far less common, although a U.S. Coast Guard license is still issued for it. Ship officers may be licensed by the Federal Communications Commission as GMDSS operators and electrical officers as GMDSS maintainers. Morse code has not been used on French ships since 1997 and on U.S. ones since 1999 However, an FCC certificate for radiotelegraphy may still be obtained.

=== Steward's department ===
==== Chief steward ====
The chief steward directs, instructs, and assigns personnel performing such functions as preparing and serving meals; cleaning and maintaining officers' quarters and steward department areas; and receiving, issuing, and inventorying stores. The chief steward also plans menus, and compiles supply, overtime, and cost control records. The steward may requisition or purchase stores and equipment. Additional duties may include baking bread, rolls, cakes, pies and pastries.

==== Chief cook ====
The chief cook is the senior unlicensed crew member working in the steward's department of a ship. The position corresponds to that of the boatswain in the deck department, the pump man in an oil tanker, and the electrician (but not ETO) in the engine department of a container ship or general cargo ship. It is the equivalent to a chief petty officer in the Navy, and equal to a captain rank in the kitchen.

The chief cook directs and participates in the preparation and serving of meals; determines timing and sequence of operations required to meet serving times; inspects galley and equipment for cleanliness and proper storage and preparation of food.

== Royal Navy historical ship's complement ==
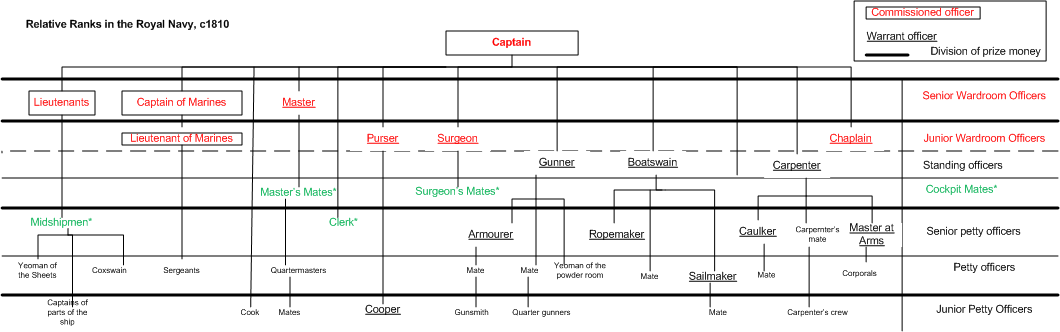
Relative ranks in the Royal Navy, c. 1810. Warrant officers are underlined in the chart.

The captain was a commissioned officer naval officer in command of a ship and was addressed by naval custom as "captain" while aboard in command, regardless of the officer's actual rank.

=== Wardroom officers ===
The lieutenants were commissioned officers immediately subordinate to the captain. Lieutenants were numbered by their seniority within the ship, so that a frigate (which was entitled to three lieutenants) would have a first lieutenant, a second lieutenant, and a third lieutenant. A first-rate was entitled to six lieutenants, and they were numbered accordingly.

The "sailing master" was a naval officer trained in and responsible for the navigation of a sailing vessel. The rank can be equated to a professional seaman and specialist in navigation, rather than as a military commander and was originally a warrant officer who ranked with, but after, the lieutenants and was eventually renamed to "navigating lieutenant" in 1867.

The captain of marines was the commissioned officer in command of the Royal Marines on the ship.

The purser was the officer responsible for all administrative duties and ship's supplies, such as food and drink, clothing, bedding, candles. The purser was originally known as "the clerk of burser". Pursers received no pay but were entitled to profits made through their business activities. In the 18th century a purser would buy his warrant for £65 and was required to post sureties totalling £2,100 with the Admiralty. They maintained and sailed the ships and were the standing officers of the navy, staying with the ships in port between voyages as caretakers supervising repairs and refitting.

The surgeon was the medical officer of the ship. Surgeons were ranked by the Navy Board based on their training and social status. Surgeons were wardroom warrant officers with a high status, billeted along with the other officers in the wardroom. Surgeons were assisted by surgeon's mates, who after 1805 were called "assistant surgeons". The surgeon and his mates were assisted by boys, who were called loblolly boys, named after the gruel commonly served in the sick bay. A small number of doctors with a prestigious medical education were ranked as physicians; they would supervise surgeons on ships or run hospitals on shore.

The chaplain led the ship's religious services. As an ordained minister, his social status meant he was made an officer.

=== Standing officers ===
The gunner was the warrant officer in charge of the ship's naval artillery and other weapons. He supervised the armourer, the gunner's mate and the yeoman of the powder room.

The boatswain (/ˈboʊsən/), bo's'n, bos'n, or bosun, was the warrant officer of the deck department. As deck crew foreman, the boatswain planned the day's work and assigned tasks to the deck crew. As work was completed, the boatswain checked the completed work was done correctly. He supervised the ropemaker, the boatswain's mate and the sailmaker.

The carpenter was the warrant officer who was responsible for the maintenance and repair of the wooden components of the ship. He supervised the caulker, the carpenter's mate and the master-at-arms.

=== Cockpit mates ===
Originally, a master's mate was an experienced petty officer, who assisted the master, but was not in line for promotion to lieutenant. By the mid-eighteenth century, he was far more likely to be a superior midshipman, still waiting to pass his examination for lieutenant or to receive his commission, but taking rather more responsibility aboard ship. Six master's mates were allowed on a first rate, three on a third rate, and two on most frigates.

=== Senior petty officers ===
A midshipman was an apprentice officer who had previously served at least three years as a volunteer, officer's servant or able seaman, and was roughly equivalent to a present-day petty officer in rank and responsibilities. After serving at least three years as a midshipman or master's mate, he was eligible to take the examination for lieutenant. Promotion to lieutenant was not automatic, and many midshipmen took positions as master's mates for an increase in pay and responsibility aboard ship.

The clerk was a literate worker who did administrative work on the ship.

The armourer maintained and repaired the smaller weapons on the ship.

The caulker maintained and repaired the caulking of the ship's hull.

The ropemaker made, maintained and repaired ropes on board.

The master-at-arms was a naval rating, responsible for discipline aboard ship, assisted by corporals.

=== Petty officers ===
The yeoman of the sheets was in charge of the rope store. Given that the ship was rarely dry inside and the ropes rotted when wet, preserving the rope was a major problem.

== See also ==
- Ship transport
- United States Merchant Marine Academy
