= Chief cook =

Ship crewman responsible for handling and preparing food

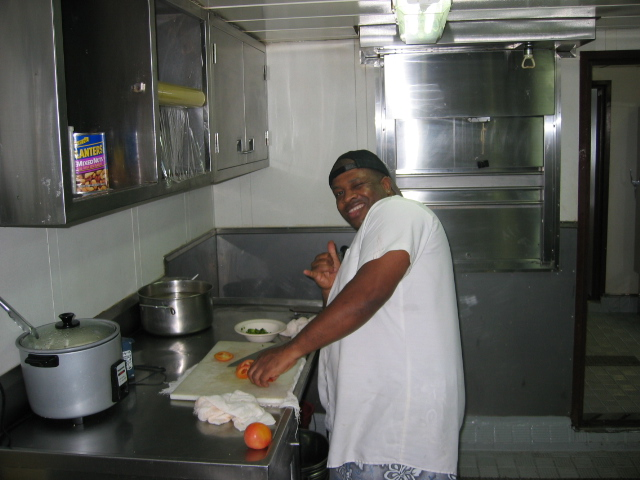
- A chief cook at work in a ship's galley in May 2005.

General
- Other names: Cook
- Department: Steward's department
- Reports to: Chief steward
- Duties: Food handler, cleaning, stocking
- Requirements: Specialized training

Watchstanding
- Watchstander: No

A chief cook (often shortened to cook) is a seniormost unlicensed crewmember working in the steward's department of a merchant ship. The chief cook's principal role is to ensure the preparation and serving of meals that are both delicious and nutritious.

In addition to directing and participating in the preparation and serving of meals, the chief cook determines timing and sequence of operations required to meet serving times; inspects the galley and equipment for cleanliness; and oversees proper storage and preparation of food. The cook may plan or assist in planning meals and taking inventory of stores and equipment.

A chief cook's duties may overlap with those of the steward's assistant, the chief steward, and other steward's department crewmembers.

In the United States Merchant Marine, in order to be occupied as a chief cook a person has to have a Merchant Mariner's Document issued by the United States Coast Guard. Because of international conventions and agreements, all chief cooks who sail internationally are similarly documented by their respective countries.

== See also ==
- Seafarer's professions and ranks
- Chef (Chef cuisinier)
