= Nordin (surname) =

Nordin is a common Swedish surname, carried by 10,805 people in Sweden. North American immigrants sometimes spelled it Nordeen, to emulate the Swedish emphasis on the second syllable. Similar Swedish surnames are Nordén (carried by 1,788), Nordling (1,166), Norén (6,033), Norin (1,834), and Norlin (2,167). Nordin and Nordeen can also be spellings of the Arabic name Nur al-Din. "Nor" or "Nur" is an Arabic word, which means light and "Al-Din,” “Deen,” or "Din" means religion.

Notable people with the surname include:

- Alice Nordin (1871–1948), Swedish sculptor
- Anders Nordin, Brazilian drummer (adopted by Swedish parents)
- Arnaud Nordin (born 1998), French football midfielder
- Birgit Nordin (1934–2022), Swedish operatic soprano
- Carl Gustaf Nordin (1749–1812), Swedish statesman, historian and ecclesiastic
- Elisabet Anrep-Nordin (1857–1947), Swedish educator
- Frida Nordin (born 1982), Swedish football midfielder
- Hans Nordin (disambiguation), multiple people
- Håkan Nordin, Swedish ice hockey player
- Jake Nordin, American football tight end
- Jennie Nordin (born 1993), Swedish association football player
- Jesper Nordin (disambiguation), multiple people
- Jonas Nordin (born 1968), Swedish historian
- Krister Nordin, Swedish former professional football (soccer) player
- Mohamed Khaled Nordin, Malaysian politician
- Olle Nordin, Swedish football coach
- Patrik Nordin, Swedish ski mountaineer and cross-country skier
- Peter Nordin, Swedish computer scientist, entrepreneur and author
- Quinn Nordin (born 1998), American football player
- Rodrigue Nordin, French sprinter
- Sariana Nordin (born 1976), Bruneian aviator
- Siiri Nordin, Finnish singer
- Sten Nordin, Swedish politician of the Moderate Party
- Sven Nordin, Norwegian actor
