= Fishing guide =

A fishing guide is a guide who specializes in guiding recreational anglers.

== Overview ==
Some anglers may choose to hire fishing guides who are knowledgeable about the local fishing grounds and feeding patterns.

== History ==
=== USA ===
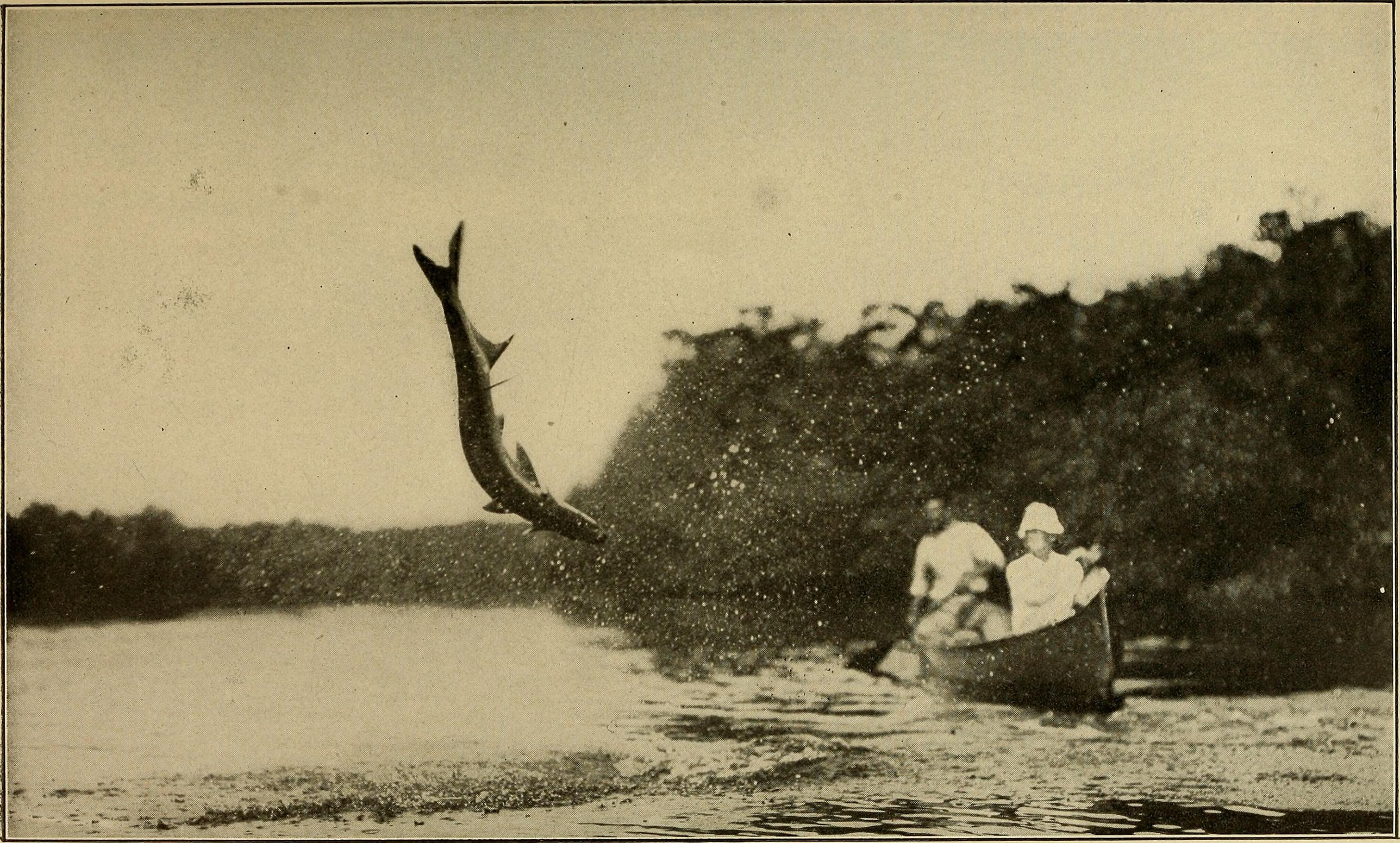
Atlantic tarpon fishing with a fishing guide from a canoe in Florida in 1885

Guided fishing is very common in the American state of Florida with guided fishing trips out of Islamorada starting in the 1930s. Guided fishing for Atlantic tarpon further up the Florida coast started even earlier at the end of the 1800s, early guides generally catered to wealthy anglers from big northern American cities but also Europeans who often engaged them for extended periods of time of weeks or months. These tourists and guides were often associated with private clubs, hotels, or lodges.

=== Gillie ===
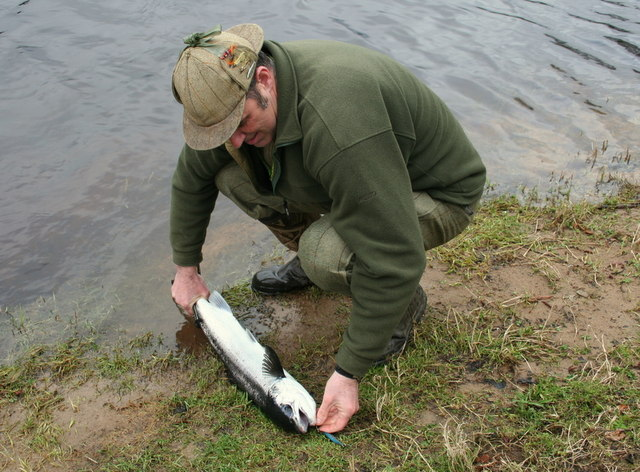
The Kinermoney Ghillie dealing with a kelt

Gillie or ghillie is an ancient Gaelic term for a person who acts as a servant or attendant on a fishing, hunting, deer stalking or hawking expedition, primarily in the Scottish Highlands or on a river such as the River Spey. In origin it referred especially to someone who attended on behalf of his male employer or guests.

This position still exists in some Highland locations as of 2021, such as the Isle of Skye, according to the BBC. They are no longer manservants or attendants and do not carry chiefs across rivers as in the distant past; today, they "manage the wilderness and guide travellers through it".

== Employment ==
The increase in popularity of flats fishing, especially combined with fly fishing, as a destination activity has created additional job opportunities for fishing guides in some destinations.

=== Licensing ===
In the American state of Florida there is no licensing scheme for fishing guides beyond federal requirements for those who operate some motor vessels to have a United States Coast Guard Charter Boat Captain's license. Fishing guides in the state of Alaska were required to be licensed at the state level after 2004 but were not before then.

== Notable fishing guides ==
- Håkan Andersson (ice hockey)
- Thomas Barker (fishing guide)
- Bouncer Smith
- Ebenezer Quippish
- Guillaume Fourrier
- Cindy Garrison
- Bud Lilly
- Mahroot
- Frank Mundus
- Hans Nordin (fisherman)
- Tom Rosenbauer
- Ted Fay (fly fisherman)

== See also ==
- Outfitter
- FishingBooker
