= Bouncer Smith =

Randolph "Bouncer" Smith is a Florida charter captain, writer, and conservationist.

== Personal life ==
Smith grew up in Michigan before his family moved to Miami, Florida in the 1950s.

He retired to Marietta, Georgia.

== Career ==
Smith began working aboard recreational fishing boats as a mate at 18. He received his United States Coast Guard Charter Boat Captain's license in 1968. He spent a few years operating as a flats fishing guide out of Islamorada before moving to Fort Lauderdale and then back to Miami. Smith was an early proponent of the use of fishing kites and downriggers.

Smith was an early adopter of fish tagging which helps researchers track fish habits and population changes. Smith began tagging Dolphin fish along with his clients in 2005.

By 2019 Smith had guided more than 15,000 people.

Smith retired on June 1, 2020.

=== Books ===
Smith has published three books, The Bouncer Smith Chronicles: A Lifetime of Fishing, The Further Chronicles of Bouncer Smith: Fish On, and The Bouncer Smith Guidebook to Saltwater Gamefish, South Florida & the Bahamas.

== Reputation and legacy ==
There is a general superstition among anglers and other watermen that having bananas aboard a boat is bad luck. Smith holds to this superstition and claims that his habit of snipping the labels off of fruit of the loom underwear to turn a bad day of fishing around led to the removal of the banana from the collection of fruit on the label. Smith claims that this change is due to his snipping the label of a fruit of the loom corporate executive in the 1990s.

In 2018 Smith was awarded the International Game Fish Association's Individual Conservation Award. In 2021 he was awarded the Dolphin Research Program's Recognition of Distinguished Tagging Effort Award.

In 2021 Marlin Magazine wrote that "When it comes to fishing in the United States, Capt. Bouncer Smith is something of a national treasure." and noted his particular expertise and long experience in swordfish fishing off South Florida.

== See also ==
- Environment of Florida
- Florida tourism industry
