= Green-sticking =

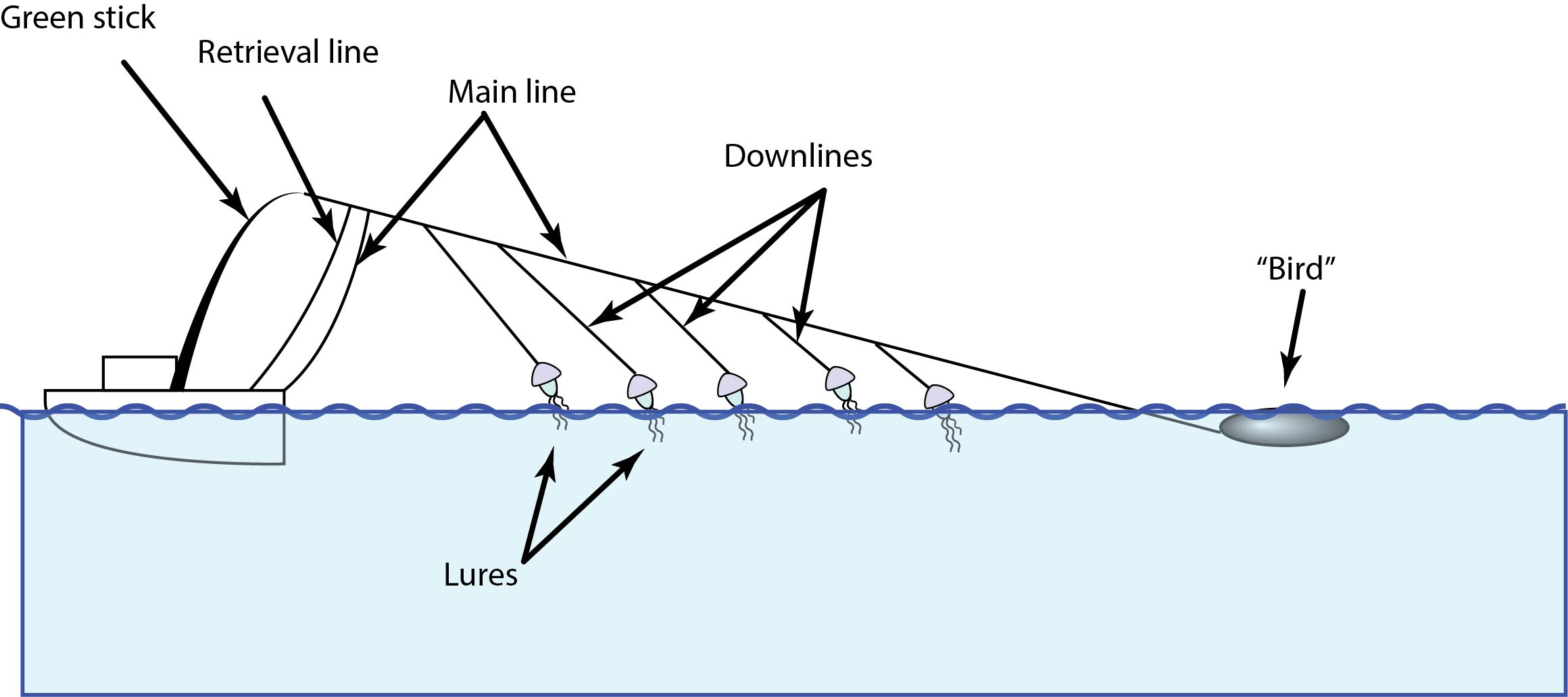
Green-sticking

Green-sticking, also referred to as green stick fishing, is a technique for fishing for tuna by trolling synthetic squid from a fiberglass pole around 30 feet (9.1 m) above the water surface. As part of the technique, the squid spend very little time submerged in the water and more of it suspended in the air above— in this way it resembles kite fishing. It is named for the green tint of the extremely long fiberglass poles originally made in Japan specifically for this purpose (though more recent poles may be made from other materials and be of any color). The poles come in sections of 11 feet (3.4 m), and are hollow and tapered so that they can be nested inside one another. The assembled pole is normally between 34 feet (10 m) and 45 feet (14 m) long.

The main line of a green-sticking fishing pole typically runs over 1,000 feet (300 m) and will be made of 800- to 1000-pound monofilament fishing line. Between five and seven squid lures are then attached to this line between 35 feet (11 m) and 45 feet (14 m) apart. The lengths of these leader lines vary depending on the length of the pole so that as the angle of the main line "details" more to the water, the lures will tend to skip across its surface rather than sink beneath it. Finally, at the end of the main line is attached an artificial "bird" which drags about 600 feet (180 m) behind the watercraft. This bird, which is about 3.5 feet (1.1 m) long and weighs about 18 pounds (8.2 kg), is painted to resemble a small cetacean. It moves below the waterline and holds the line taught so that the lures can effectively skip over the water ahead of it. Fishermen believe that the bird creates a visual signal to passing tuna that potential food lies ahead and that they should outrun the "bird" in order to get it first.

The fishing technique is unusual for two reasons. First, it relies on fishing lures which seldom enter the water, depending instead on the ability of the tuna to see what is happening in the air above the water's surface and even to select prey targets above the surface which do not normally travel there. Second, it uses the theory of competition for prey to incite the tuna to pursue the lures in an "I'm going to get it before you do" approach to hunting.
