= Licensed mariner =

Sailor who holds a maritime authority license

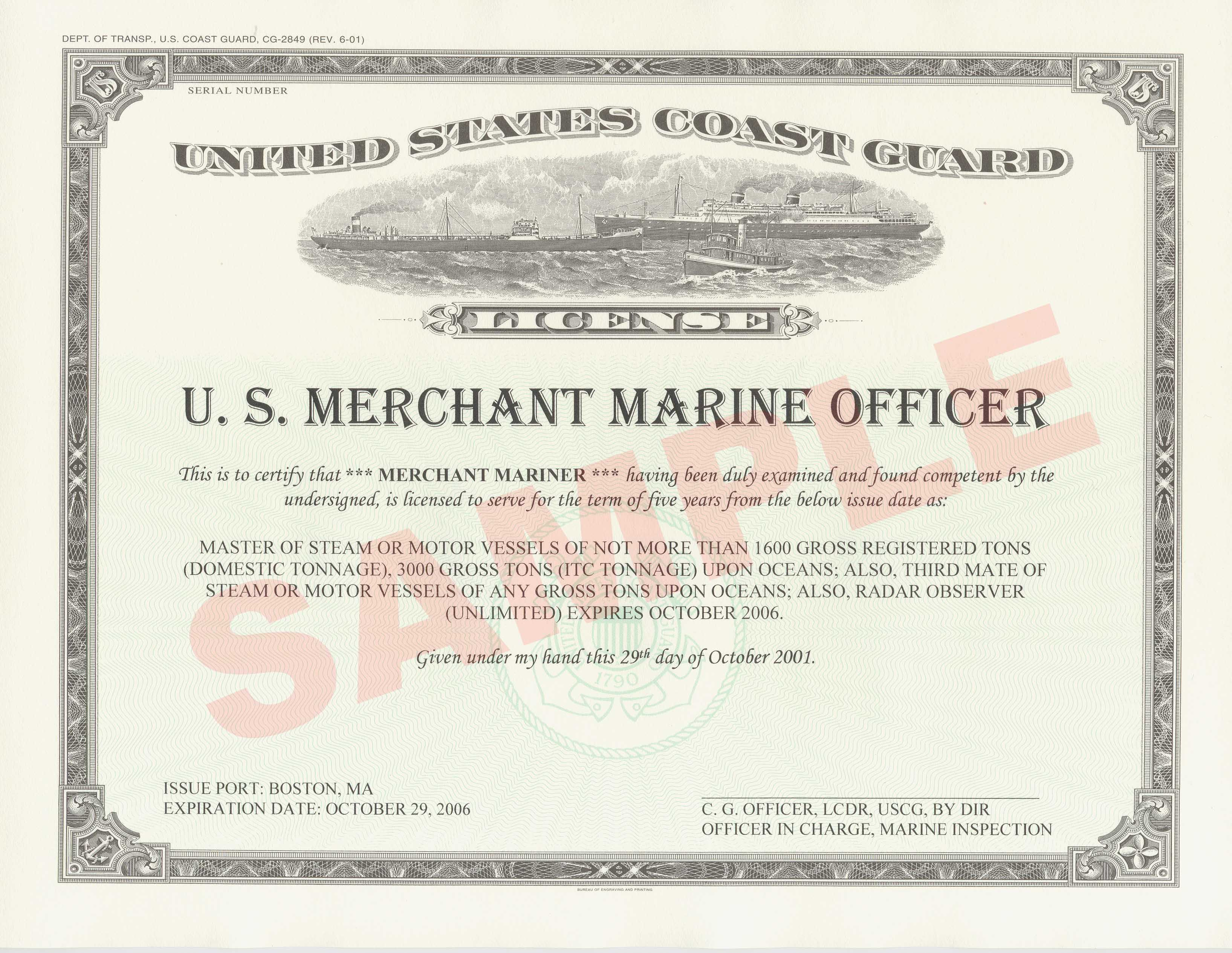
A sample United States Merchant Marine license issued by the United States Coast Guard in 2006

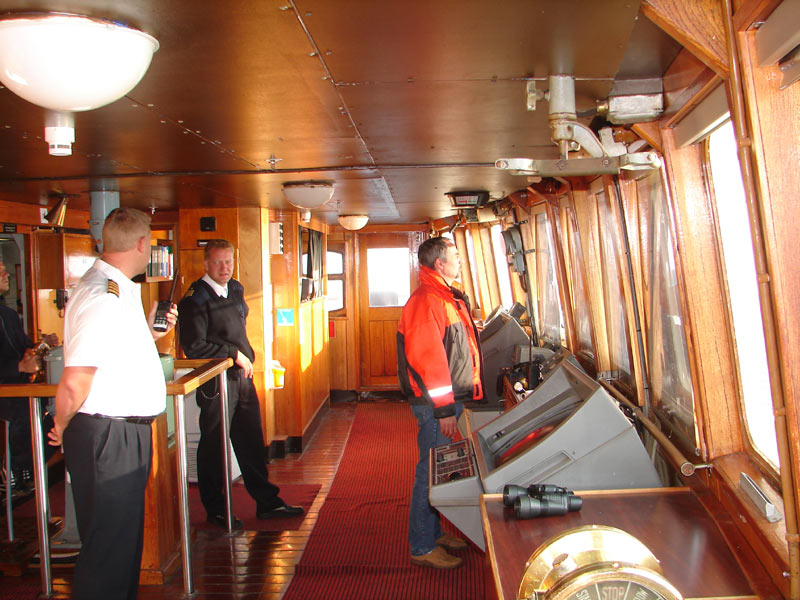
Mariners (Captain, first officer and second officer) at the controls of the Kristina Regina

A licensed mariner is a sailor who holds a license from a maritime authority to hold senior officer-level positions aboard ships, boats, and similar vessels. Qualification standards for licensed mariners are universally set by the STCW Convention adopted and promulgated by the International Maritime Organization (IMO), while the licenses of individual sailors are issued by the delegated maritime authorities of the member states of the IMO; these may vary in the details of the implementation, including the government agency responsible for licensing and the local names of the grades and qualifications in each particular country.

Mariners that do not have a license are referred to as unlicensed mariners or ratings.

== Licensing by country ==
In the United States, the United States Coast Guard grants licenses to members of the United States Merchant Marine in five categories: deck officers, engineers, staff officers, radio officers, and pilots. The United States Coast Guard has replaced paper licenses with the Merchant Mariners Credential which is a combination of the former Merchant Marine Officers license and Merchant Mariners Document in a small book that looks similar to a passport. Several States within the United States issue a state mariners license for use upon non-federal inland waters. Most of these states honor USCG Merchant Marine licenses as an alternative to state licensing. State licensing programs closely follow the federal guidelines for issuance of these licenses, including the requirements concerning professional maritime training and experience.

In the United Kingdom, the Maritime and Coastguard Agency issue licenses, known as Certificates of Competency, in a similar fashion under the amended STCW convention. Previously, they were issued by the Board of Trade until 1927.

In Canada, licenses are issued in accordance to STCW conventions by Transport Canada and are referred to as Certificates of Competencies as in the British system.

== Types ==
=== Deck officers ===
There are a wide variety of licenses for deck officers, with restrictions of geography and tonnage. Licenses without such restrictions are called unlimited as in Third Mate or Officer of the Watch, Unlimited. The grades of unlimited licenses are:

- Master's License for masters and lower grades.
- Chief Mate's License for chief mates and lower grades.
- Second Mate's License qualifies the holder as second mate or third mate.
- Third Mate's License qualifies the holder as third mate.

Mariner licenses range from large to small vessels. Smaller charter boat operators may have a charter boat license or a certificate under the Large Yacht Code.

=== Engineers ===
Licenses are issued in the grades of:

- Chief Engineer
- First Assistant Engineer
- Second Assistant Engineer
- Third Assistant Engineer
- Electro-technical Officer
- Chief Engineer (limited)
- Assistant Engineer (limited)
- Designated duty engineer
- Chief Engineer (uninspected fishing industry vessels)
- Assistant Engineer (uninspected fishing industry vessels)

=== Staff officers ===
Staff officers are issued a Certificate of Registry in the following grades:

- Chief purser
- Purser
- Senior assistant purser
- Junior assistant purser
- Medical doctor
- Professional nurse
- Marine physician assistant
- Hospital corpsman

=== Radio officers ===
- Radio officer

=== Pilots ===
Pilot licenses vary with tonnage and geography. Types of pilot's licenses are:

- General routes (routes not restricted to rivers, canals and small lakes)
- River routes
- Canal and small lakes routes

== See also ==
- Seafarer's professions and ranks
- Master mariner § United States
- United States Coast Guard Charter Boat Captain's license
