= Deltopia =

Social event in Isla Vista, California, U.S.

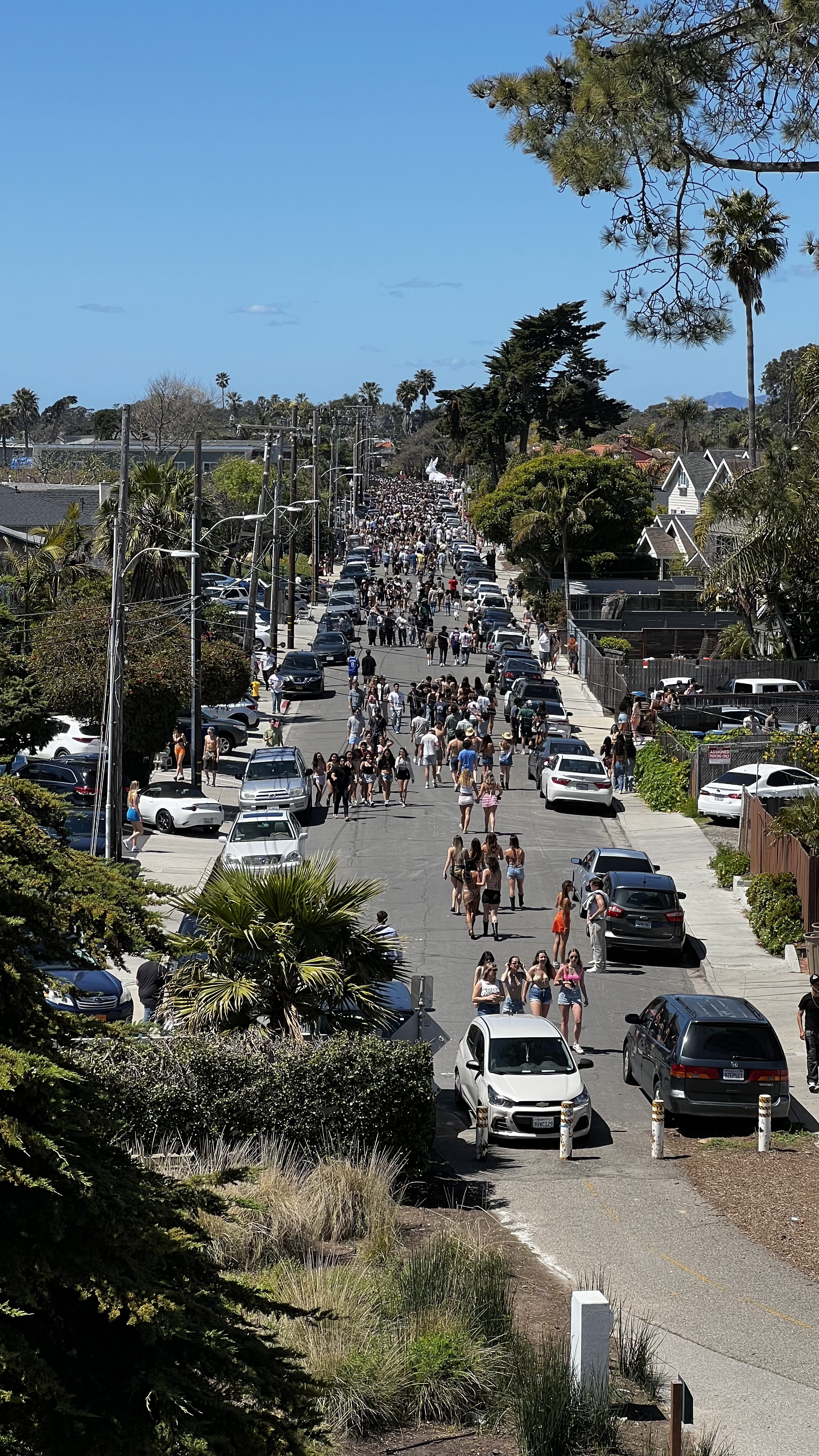
Partygoers on Del Playa Drive during Deltopia, April 2024

Deltopia, originally known as Floatopia, is a social event that began in 2004 and takes place annually in Isla Vista, California. The event was started by University of California, Santa Barbara (UCSB), students and occurs on the first weekend following the start of UCSB's spring quarter, primarily along Del Playa Drive. Participants are primarily college students. In its early years, attendance was estimated at a few hundred participants, but in later years, it grew to an estimated 20,000 to 25,000 attendees.

The former title, "Floatopia", described the main activity the event was known for – floating on rafts and other floating devices along the Pacific coast in conjunction with a beach party. The event grew in attendance with an estimated 12,000 participants in 2009. Local authorities were not expecting a crowd of this magnitude, which left environmental destruction and numerous legal and medical cases in its wake. County officials took preventative measures to ensure similar parties did not occur, and the legislation turned "Floatopia" into a terrestrial-based "Deltopia" block party for following iterations.

The popularity of Deltopia saw spin-off events created in San Diego, Miami Beach, Florida, and other locations across the world. Historically, the event has seen numerous arrests and injuries causing local authorities to allocate more resources in response. Environmental impacts have followed Deltopia and cleanup efforts have sprung up as a result, taking place after each event.

== History ==
=== Early years of Floatopia ===
Rumored to have begun in the early 1980s, Floatopia was started in 2004 by UC Santa Barbara students in Isla Vista. The event was originally titled "Floatopia", a portmanteau which referenced the flotation devices used by the attendees in the Pacific Ocean and the definition of "utopia". In addition to these floating parties, attendees also congregated at the beaches nearest Del Playa Drive.

In early years, Floatopia was patronized largely by local students from Santa Barbara City College and UC Santa Barbara and attracted hundreds of attendees. As word spread, attendance of Floatopia increased greatly, from an estimated 300 attendees in 2007 to an estimated 4,000 attendees in 2008.

=== Floatopia 2009 ===
Floatopia 2009, coinciding with the rise in usage of social media and social networking, had an event created and shared on Facebook to promote the event. As a result, an estimated crowd of 12,000 attendees descended to the Isla Vista beaches. The attendance caught local authorities off guard and outnumbered, resulting in chaos. A number of medical emergencies, citations, and arrests followed. The Santa Barbara County Sheriff's Office recognized the utilization of social networking and described the event as "... a public safety emergency and an environmental crisis ..." in their 2009 annual report.

Floatopia 2009's popularity resulted in plans for a "Floatopia 2" to occur in May 2009. Authorities, as well as some local students and residents, voiced their opinion against the sequel. The Santa Barbara County Board of Supervisors drafted emergency ordinances aimed at preventing Floatopia 2, resulting in a temporary 6 month alcohol ban at Isla Vista beaches. The restrictions, in addition to other factors such as the Jesusita Fire and environmental impact, resulted in Floatopia 2's failure to materialize.

=== Evolution into Deltopia and continued growth ===
With the success of the restrictions put in place to prevent 2009's Floatopia 2, government officials made the temporary beach alcohol ban permanent in November 2009. Officials also contemplated restricting beach access, an idea later made official, to retard the growth of an impending Floatopia 2010. In response to the changes, attendees took to Del Playa Drive in block party fashion and renamed the event "Deltopia" after the street's name. The event drew a smaller crowd in 2010, estimated at 8,000 attendees. As officials placed restrictions on the event, attendees changed their plans and continued to grow the event with an estimated 8,000 to 10,000 attendees in 2012 and 15,000 to 18,000 in 2013.

=== Floatopia/Deltopia 2014 ===
Authorities arrested about 100 attendees of Deltopia 2014. According to police, the party turned violent after some of the approximately 15,000 attendees objected to the arrest of a partygoer by the University of California Santa Barbara Police.

=== Resurgence in 2022 ===
After a two-year hiatus due to restrictions stemming from the COVID-19 pandemic, Deltopia returned in Spring 2022. In response, local authorities declared the event a multi-casualty incident, which allowed authorities to triage emergencies from attendees and shift resources accordingly. Multiple arrests and medical emergencies occurred over the duration of the event.

=== Noise ordinance, creation of Soltopia ===
In January 2026, the Santa Barbara County Board of Supervisors approved a 72-hour noise ordinance in Isla Vista for the weekend of Deltopia, effectively cancelling the unsanctioned event. In its place, the Isla Vista Community Services District planned an event called "Soltopia," a festival hosted in The Loop, away from Del Playa Drive. Approximately 12,000 people attended the first iteration of the newly-created festival on April 4, 2026 and authorities did not report any arrests or citations within the grounds of the festival.

== Repercussions ==
=== Legal citations and accident reports ===
Throughout Floatopia a number of accident reports and citations were issued. At the event 78 alcohol citations were issued and 13 arrests were made under the charges of drunk in public or disorderly conduct (throwing bottles from the bluffs towards the crowd below). Because of the large number of people concentrated in one area, most of whom were under the influence of alcohol, many injuries occurred. Two party goers were taken to the Cottage Hospital trauma center after falling from the cliffs and 33 people received treatment for head injuries, alcohol poisoning, and lacerations. The police also received a 9-1-1 call reporting a drowning person, but after they dispatched two engines and a truck to Del Playa and interviewed surrounding witnesses, no injury was actually apparent. The police stated a prevalent problem they encountered was attempting to determine which reports they received were valid.

=== Safety personnel ===
During its peak hours, Floatopia was patrolled by a dozen Foot Patrol officers, Goleta deputies, and officers from the UCSB police department, 4 county fire engines, 2 ambulances, a search and rescue crew, and a helicopter. Lt. Brian Olmstead of the Isla Vista Foot Patrol stated that about 20 county firefighters were assigned to the event. The main problem was that Floatopia required so many officials to be present that it caused a redistribution of safety personnel. Olmstead stated,"this event had an impact on the county as a whole." The increased size of Floatopia caught emergency officials off guard and cost an estimated $20,000 in taxpayer money to patrol.

=== Environmental impact ===
In an effort to reduce the environmental impact of Floatopia, the Associated Students Environmental Affairs Board, Surfrider Foundation Isla Vista, and Coastal Fund organized beach cleanups. This is thought to have been relatively unsuccessful considering much of the debris was carried out to sea as a result of the high tide. After seeing the aftermath of Floatopia, Bradley Cardinale, a professor of ecology, revealed that even though he has "traveled all over the world for [his] research…, [he has] only seen dumping like this in third world countries." Cardinale urged students to consider "how much urine went into our coastal zone… You just don't clean that up. Sure we can pick up the beer cans, but the other stuff is out there permanently".

== Related events ==
Following Santa Barbara's April 2009 Floatopia, Cal Poly student attendees created a spin-off event dubbed "Slotopia" planned for May 2009. Slotopia, a portmanteau of the Santa Barbara Floatopia event and SLO, the initials of San Luis Obispo, was planned for 100 miles north, at Shell Beach, an unincorporated community in Pismo Beach, California. The event was publicized on social media, which drew the attention of potential attendees, as well as those in opposition of the event and law enforcement. Pressure from California Polytechnic State University, San Luis Obispo and local police led to the event's cancellation in late April 2009. Despite the cancellation, officials planned to staff additional law enforcement to the area in the event attendees still showed up. According to police, the event saw fewer people than a typical Saturday at the beach.

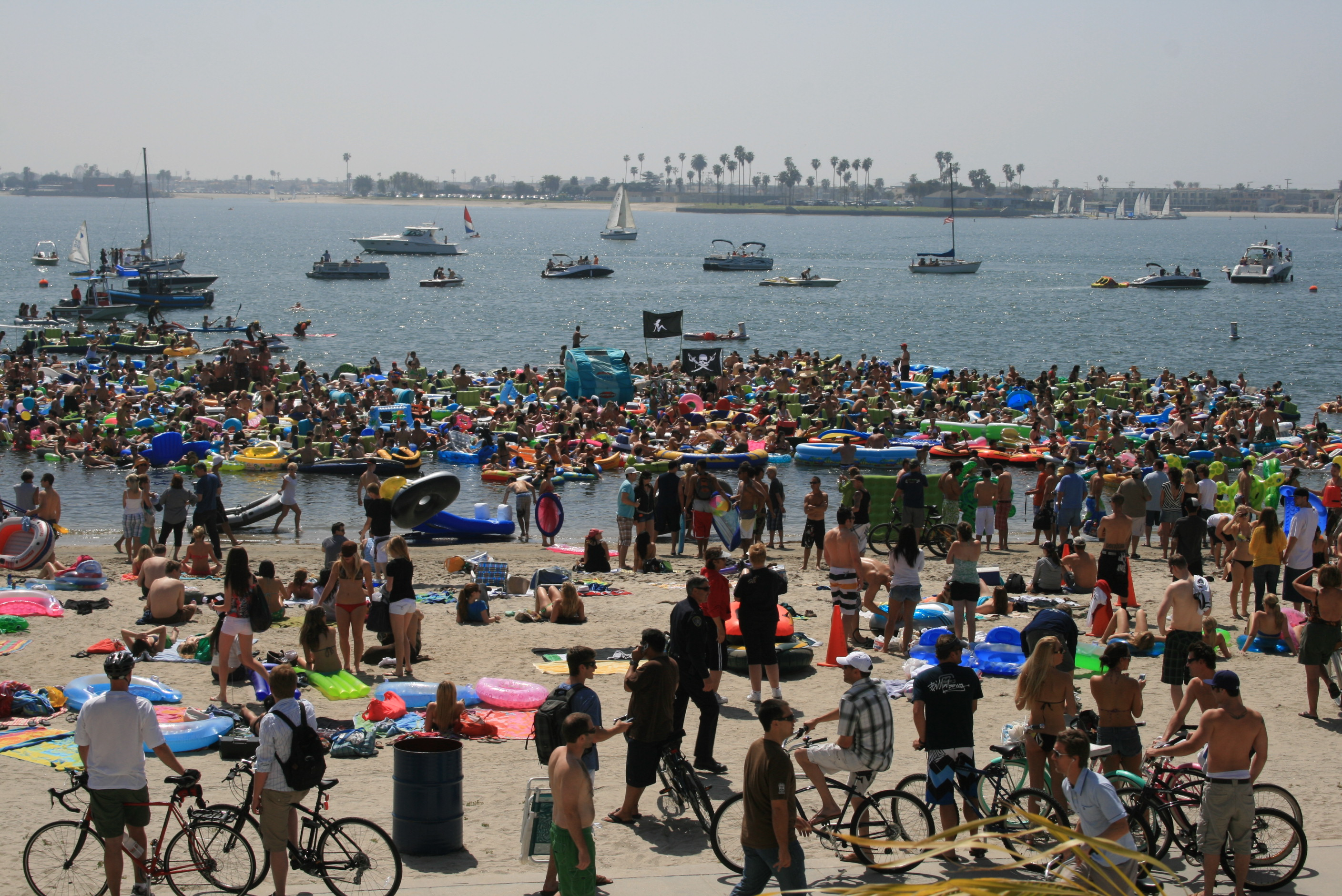
Scene from spin-off Floatopia event in San Diego, March 2010

Honolulu saw a similar event start in 2011 at Magic Island near Ala Moana Beach Park. In 2012, it was held at Kaimana Beach after a last minute change by organizers. Organizers undertook a similar strategy in 2013. In 2014, it held its March event and evolved as "Floatilla" around major holidays like Memorial Day and Independence Day. In 2016, the event made headlines for its environmental impact on two separate occasions. It would continue to hold large events in 2017 and 2018, but participation waned in 2019 and 2020.

== In film ==
In July 2021 Deadline Hollywood reported that a movie starring Luna Blaise and Madison Pettis, with executive producer Olivia Newton-John, was in production and would be based on the Deltopia 2014 events. Its announcement generated concern in the local community over the portrayal of Isla Vista. The film, Deltopia, was released in August 2023.

== See also ==
- Messabout
- Junk raft
