= Boating =

Leisure activity involving boats

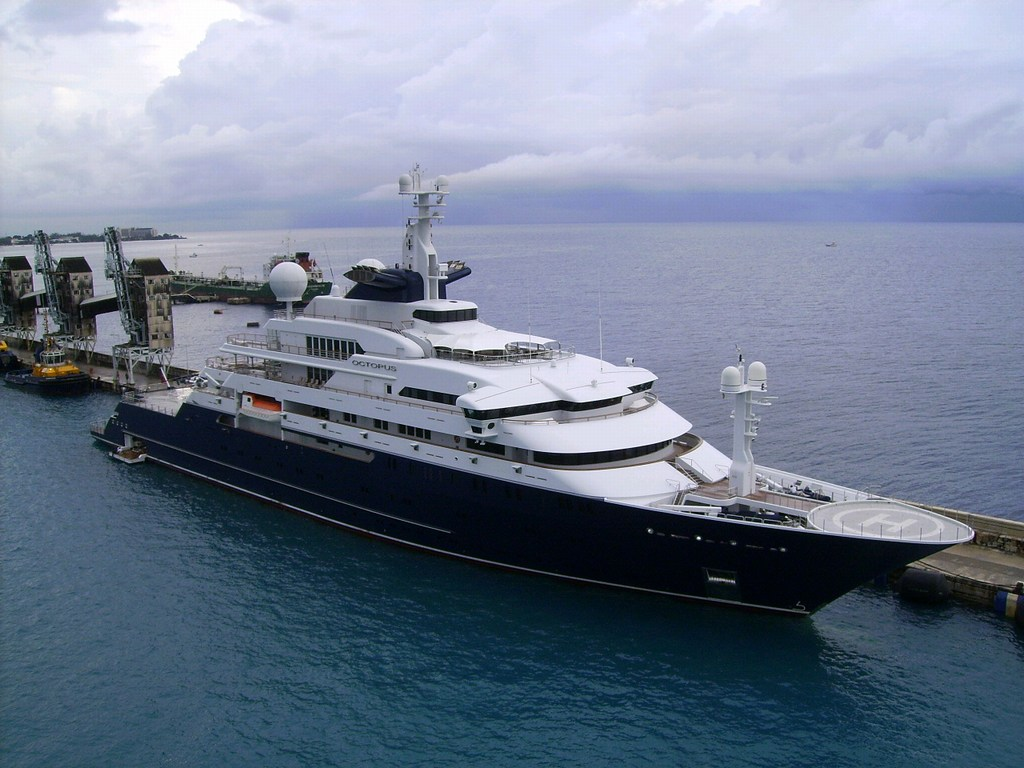
Yachts are recreational boats

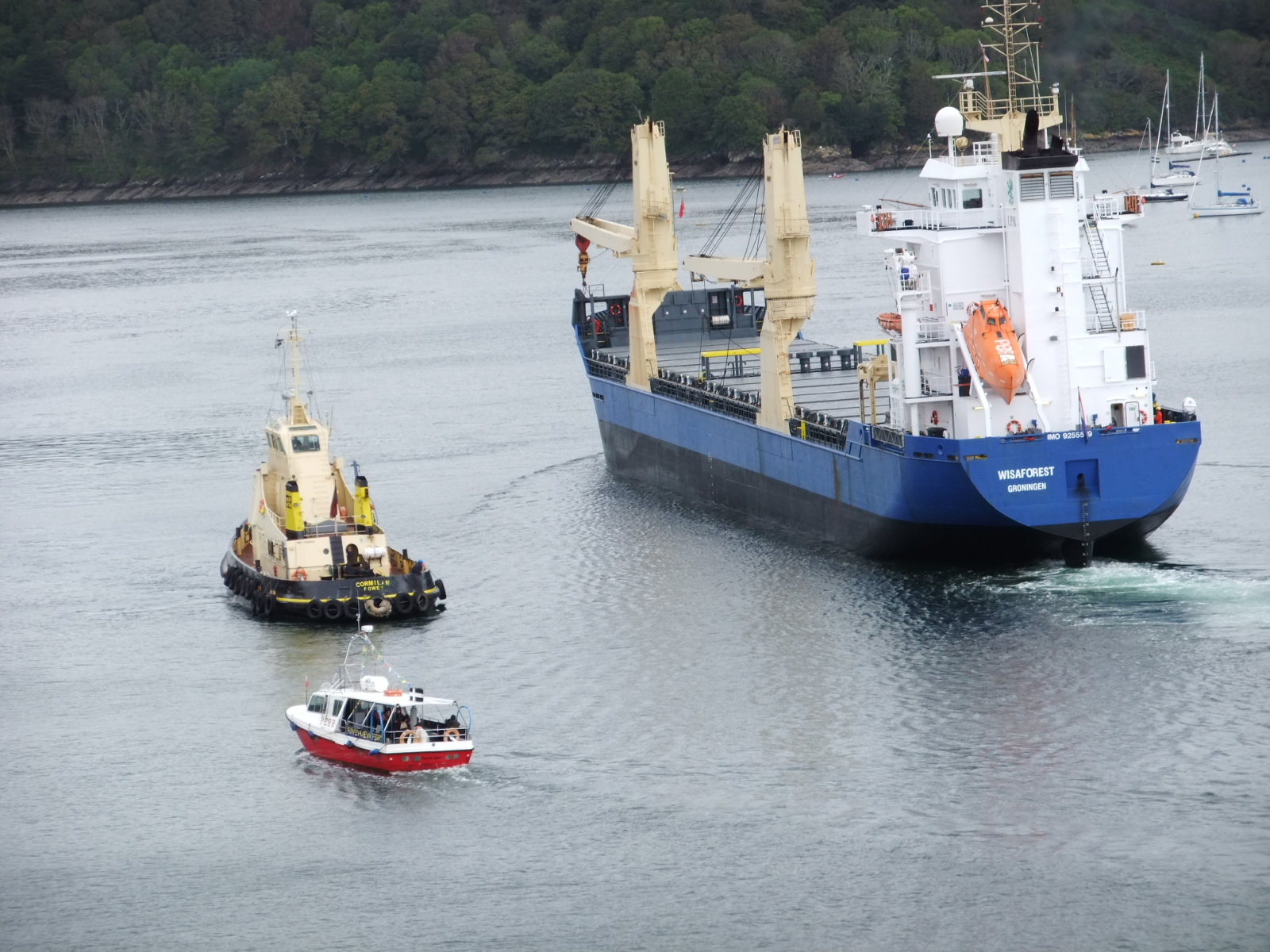
Three different types of boats

Boating is the leisurely activity of travelling by boat, or the recreational use of a boat whether powerboats, sailboats, or man-powered vessels (such as rowing and paddle-boats), focused on the travel itself, as well as sports activities, such as fishing or waterskiing. It is a popular activity, and there are millions of boaters worldwide.

== Types of boats ==
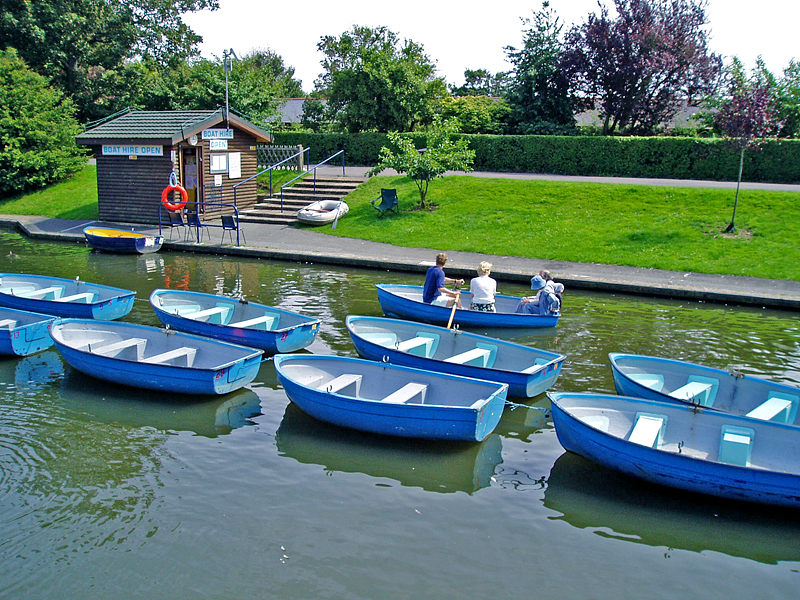
Boating on the Royal Military Canal at Hythe

Recreational boats are broadly classified as unpowered craft, motorboats, or sailboats, each including numerous subtypes designed for specific activities and environments. Recreational boats (sometimes called pleasure craft, particularly for less sporting activities) fall into several broad categories and subcategories.

Broad categories include dinghies (generally under 16 feet (5 m), powered by sail, small engines, or human effort), which are often made from hardwood or inflatable materials. Other categories include paddle sports boats (such as kayaks, rowing shells, and canoes), runabouts (15–25 ft (5–8 m) powerboats with either outboard, sterndrive, or inboard engines), daysailers (14–25 ft (4–8 m) sailboats, frequently with a small auxiliary engine), cruisers (25–65 ft (8–20 m) powerboats with cabins), and cruising and racing sailboats (25–65 ft (8–20 m) sailboats with auxiliary engines).

Other types of recreational motorboats include center-console boats (commonly 18–75 ft (5.5–23 m)), which are often used for fishing and general recreation, and deck boats (25–35 ft (8–11 m)), which are characterized by an open deck area and are typically used for leisure activities. Lifeboats are small craft equipped with emergency equipment for rescue and survival situations.

== Boating activities ==
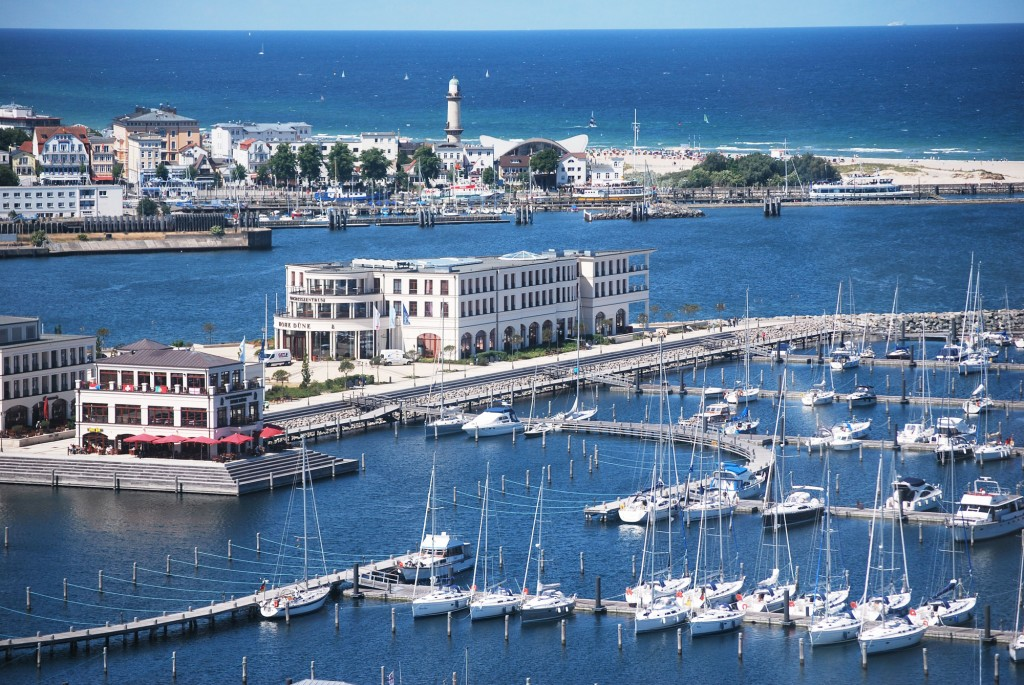
Yacht clubs and marinas are centers of boating activities – Yacht Harbour Residence "Hohe Düne" in Rostock, Germany.

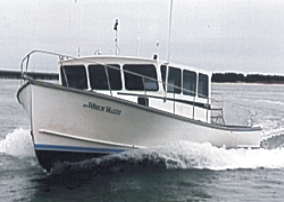
Downeast style charter boat Wreck Valley

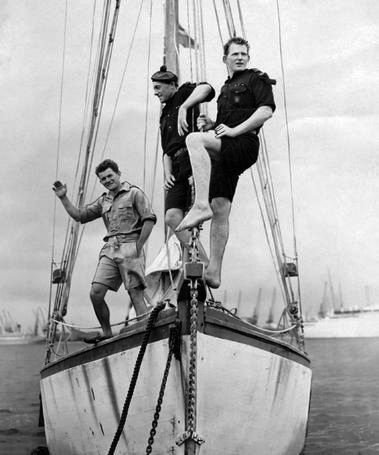
Boating as a sport

Boating activities are as varied as the boats and boaters who participate, and new ways of enjoying the water are constantly being discovered. Broad categories include the following:

- Paddlesports include ears (lakes), swiftwater (rivers), and oceangoing types, usually covered-cockpit kayaks.
  - Canoes are popular on lakes and rivers due to their carrying capacity and efficiency on the water. They are also easy to portage, or carry overland around obstructions like rapids, or just down to the water from a car or cabin.
  - Kayaks can be found on calm inland waters, whitewater rivers, and along the coasts in the oceans. Known for their maneuverability and seaworthiness, kayaks take many shapes depending on their desired use. Rowing craft are also popular for fishing, as a tender to a larger vessel, or as a competitive sport.
  - Rowing shells are extremely long and narrow, and are intended to convert as much of the rower's muscle power as possible into speed. The ratio of length of waterline to beam has much importance in marine mechanics and design.
  - Row boats or dinghies are oar powered, and generally restricted to protected waters. Rowboats are generally heavy craft compared to other has
- Sailing can be either competitive, as in collegiate dinghy racing, or purely recreational as when sailing on a lake with family or friends.
  - Small sailboats also called dinghies are commonly made from fiberglass, and will have wood, aluminum, or carbon-fiber spars, and generally a sloop rig (two sails: a mainsail and a jib, commonly include 3rd sail the spinnaker for going downwind). Racing dinghies and skiffs tend to be lighter, have more sail area, and may use a trapeze to allow one or both crewmembers to suspend themselves over the water for additional stability.
  - Larger trailerable sailboats include trailer sailers, which have enclosed accommodation, and sportboats which are optimised for speed.
  - Daysailers tend to be wider across the beam and have greater accommodation space at the expense of speed.
  - Cruising sailboats have more width, but performance climbs as they tend to be much longer with a starting over-all length of at least 25 feet (8 m) re-balancing the dynamic ratio between length of waterline (aiding speed) and beam width (adding cargo and people space).
- Freshwater fishing boats account for approximately 1/3 of all registered boats in the U.S., and most all other types of boats end up being used as fishing boats on occasion. The boating industry has developed freshwater fishing boat designs that are species-specific to allow anglers the greatest advantage when fishing for walleye, salmon, trout, bass, etcetera, as well as generic fishing craft.
- Watersport Boats or skiboats are high-powered Go-Fast boats (specialized towboats in fact) is designed for activities where a participant is towed behind the boat such as waterskiing and parasailing.
  - Variations on the ubiquitous waterski include wakeboards, water-skiing, kneeboarding, inflatable towables, and wake surfing. To some degree, the nature of these boating activities influences boat design. Waterski boats are intended to hold a precise course at an accurate speed with a flat wake for slalom skiing runs. Wakeboard boats run at slower speeds, and have various methods including ballast and negative lift foils to force the stern in the water, thereby creating a large and "jumpable" wake.
  - Saltwater fishing boats vary widely in length and are once again specialized for various species of fish. Flats boats, for example, are used in protected, shallow waters, and have shallow draft. Sportfishing boats range from 25 to 80 feet (8 to 24 m) or more, and can be powered by large outboard engines or inboard diesels. Fishing boats in colder climates may have more space dedicated to cuddy cabins and wheelhouses, while boats in warmer climates are likely to be entirely open.
  - Cruising boats applies to both power and sailboats, and refers to trips from local weekend passages to lengthy voyages, and is a lifestyle. While faster "express cruisers" can be used for multiple day trips, long voyages generally require a slower displacement boat (trawler) with diesel power and greater stability and efficiency. Cruising sailboats range from 20 to 70 feet (6 to 21 m) and more, and have easily managed sail plans to allow relatively small crews to sail them long distances. Some cruising sailboats will have two masts (ketch, yawl, or schooner rigs) to further reduce the size of individual sails and make it possible for a couple to handle larger boats. Diesel- (now sometimes electric-) powered Narrowboats are a very popular mode of travel (and accommodation) on the inland waterways of England.
- Racing and regattas are common group activities in the sub-culture of boaters owning larger (twenty-five foot plus) small boats and larger yachts, and are frequently organized around a yacht club or marina organization
  - Sailboat racing can be done on conventional family sailboats racing under one of the simpler handicap formulas (PHRF, or Performance Handicap Rating Formula is one such rule), or can be done on specialized boats with virtually no accommodation or compromises for comfort. Racing is generally either one design, where the boats are close to identical, or handicapped where the boats' finishing times are adjusted based on their predicted speed potential. Racing is further broken down into ocean racing, where boats start at one port and race in the ocean and back to the same port or a new destination, or buoy racing where boats race around prescribed courses and return to port at night. Several famous races cross oceans, like the biennial Transpac Race from Los Angeles to Honolulu, or the Newport-Bermuda Race from Newport, Rhode Island to Bermuda. Other races actually circumnavigate the globe, like the Volvo Ocean Race or Vendee Globe race.

== Environmental considerations and electric boating ==
=== Electric and hybrid propulsion ===
The recreational boating industry increasingly adopts electric boats and hybrid propulsion systems to reduce environmental impact. The global electric boat market was valued at USD 7.68 billion in 2025 and is projected to reach USD 20.85 billion by 2035, with a compound annual growth rate of 10.5%.

Electric boats offer advantages including reduced noise pollution, zero direct emissions, and lower operating costs. Modern electric propulsion systems utilize lithium-ion batteries and may incorporate solar panels for renewable energy charging.

=== Sustainable boating practices ===
Eco-friendly boating practices help preserve marine ecosystems and reduce environmental impact. Key sustainable practices include using biodegradable cleaning products, proper waste disposal at designated facilities, responsible anchoring to avoid damage to seagrass beds and coral reefs, and minimizing fuel consumption through efficient route planning.

== Anchoring ==
Anchoring a boat is essential to recreational boaters by giving them the ability to "park" their boat in the water. Anchoring is helpful to boaters who fish or swim off of their boat and provides a stable and established site to achieve whatever activity is being done. Anchoring a boat is also critical in emergency situations and is a good safety measure whenever a vessel becomes disabled. There are three types of anchors, the Plow-style, the Fluke-style, and the Mushroom anchor.

- Plow-style is the most effective for most boats especially larger boats (over 26 feet (8 m)). It receives its holding power by plowing into the bottom sediments using the boats mass to drag it underneath the soil.
- Fluke-style or Danforth anchor is similar to the plow anchor but is more lightweight. This anchor is commonly used on boats smaller than 30 feet (9 m) but is very effective by using its pointed flukes to bury into the sediment below.
- Mushroom anchors are designed for situations which require a permanent anchor with strong holding power. The weight of a mushroom anchor causes it to be slowly buried under soft sediment, giving significant holding power and are typically used for moorings, buoys, and other permanent anchoring needs. Mushroom anchors are not carried on a boat for use as a temporary or short term anchor. Initially there is no holding power due to the significant amount of time required for the anchor to settle and bury itself in the sediment.

A rope anchor line should be at least four times longer than the depth of the water in the anchorage. A seven to eight foot chain should also be attached between the rope and the anchor in order to reduce the angle of the pull on the anchor facilitated by the chain sinking and lying on the bottom. This is important because in order for the anchor to be effective, the pull must be at a shallow angle rather than vertically. A vertical pull on the anchor will result in the anchor breaking out of the bottom sediment and is used as a technique to break the anchor's hold allowing the anchor to be raised in order to leave the anchorage.

The anchor should never be dragged behind a boat or dropped at the stern. This could result in the boat being swamped or filled with water. Tie off the anchor to a bow cleat and pull on it to make sure that the knot is secure. After that make sure the vessel is down wind or down current of the anchor. After anchoring it is important to check visual sightings and onshore objects or buoys to let the driver know if his boat is secure by the anchor. The anchor will help boaters to stay in their current position on the water.

== Preparation and Inspection ==
Before launching any boat, it is critical to perform systematic inspection and maintenance procedures designed to ensure the boat's safety and operational readiness following storage periods.

=== Hull and structural assessment ===
Initial preparation begins with comprehensive hull examination to identify potential damage incurred during storage periods. Always conduct visual inspections for stress fractures, osmotic blisters, and gelcoat deterioration. Through-hull fittings receive particular scrutiny due to their susceptibility to seasonal degradation. Hull cleaning procedures simultaneously remove accumulated contaminants and permit assessment of antifouling paint condition, with reapplication recommended when coatings exceed two seasons of service or show significant wear patterns. You should clean and wax your boat hull every season or other season to help protect the gelcoat against the harsh marine environment. If you have an older boat or a boat with a lot of teak, you should inspect the teak and refinish it if required.

=== Propulsion and mechanical systems ===
Engine preparation follows established maintenance protocols including fluid level verification and replacement schedules. Standard procedures should include engine oil, hydraulic fluids, coolant, and transmission fluid assessment. Fuel system maintenance includes filter and/or water separator replacement and fuel quality evaluation. Air filtration systems undergo cleaning or replacement, while drive belts receive inspection for wear indicators, cracking, or elongation. Propulsion components, including propellers, are examined for impact damage or cavitation effects. Battery systems require testing, terminal cleaning, and electrolyte level verification where applicable. For inboard boats, making sure your engine bay blower fan is functioning properly is critical to help remove any fuel vapors from the engine room.

=== Electrical system verification ===
Electrical system preparation involves systematic testing of all onboard electronic equipment including navigation systems, communication devices, lighting circuits, bilge pumps and safety equipment. Wiring harnesses and connections undergo inspection for corrosion, particularly in marine environments where moisture exposure occurs. Bilge pump systems receive mandatory testing due to their critical safety function. Bilge pump operation is a critical test for any boat whether you are trailering or keeping it in the water. Electrical distribution panels and circuit protection devices are verified for proper operation and appropriate amperage ratings.

=== Safety equipment compliance ===
Safety equipment preparation ensures compliance with applicable maritime regulations and that you have USCG approved equipment for US Boaters. USCG Personal flotation devices ("PFDs") undergo inspection for fabric integrity, closure functionality, and buoyancy retention. In 2025, the USCG revised and updated their PFD regulations which were effective January 6, 2025 and began enforcing the rule on June 4, 2025. Fire suppression equipment requires pressure testing and certification verification making sure nothing is expired. Emergency signaling devices, including visual distress signals and USCG approved flares, are inventoried and replaced according to expiration schedules and that you have the proper ones for your boat size. Navigation lights and sound signaling devices receive operational testing to ensure regulatory compliance.

== Transport and storage ==
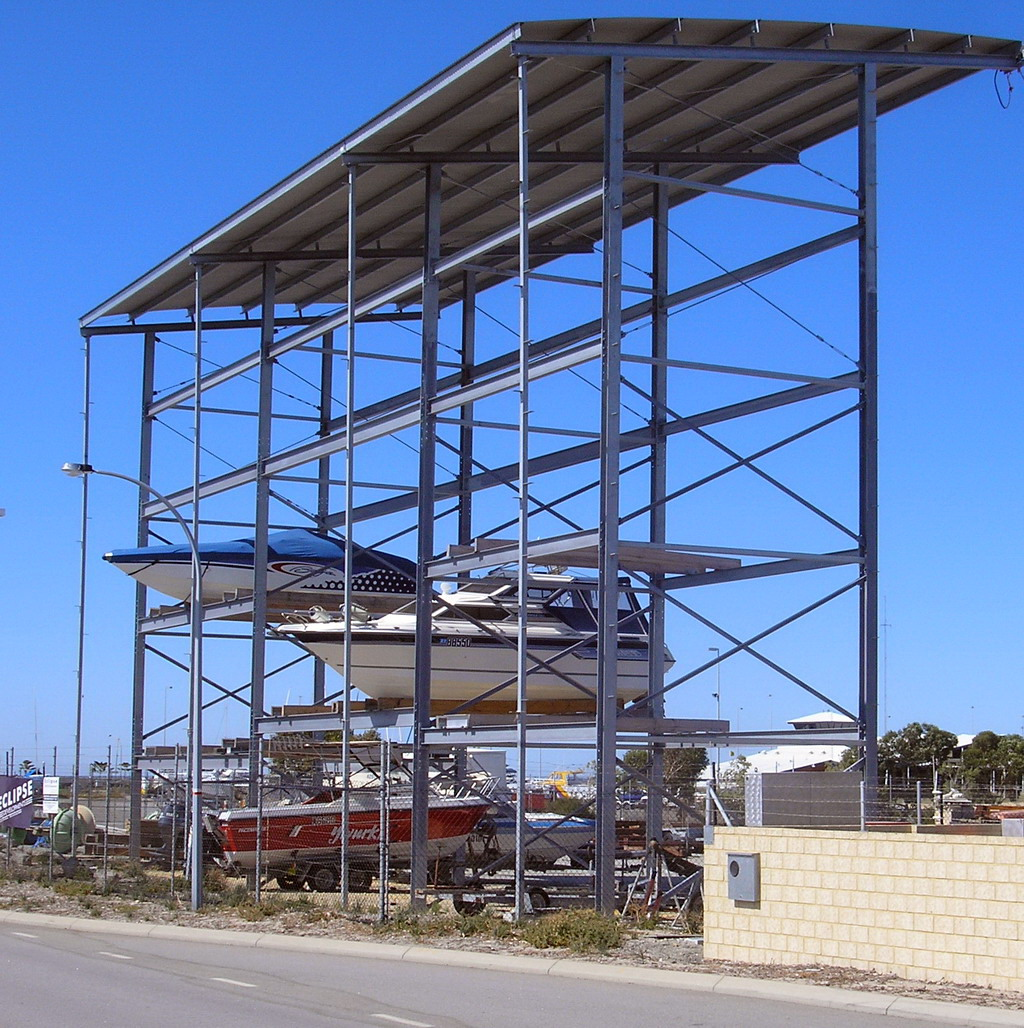
Rack storage

The smallest boats and kayaks may simply be carried by hand or by lashing them to the top of an automobile. Most smaller boats are stored at home and carried to the water on boat trailers, where they are floated from launch ramps leading down into the water. Some marinas will also offer electric hoists that can lift a boat from a trailer and swing it into the water (generally less than 6 tons). Larger boats are kept at marinas, which offer a berth protected from the weather and a variety of support services, such as fuel and equipment.

A more recent form of storage is rack storage where runabouts are stored in large steel racks, sometimes four or five boats high, and perhaps 25 boats across. These racks are housed in sheds, and large specialized fork trucks are used to lift the boats from the racks and place them in the water. This reduces the amount of space needed for boat storage, and also provides a clean environment in which the boats are housed. Some marinas will offer dry storage yards, where boats on trailers or dollies are stored on a hard surface. Many yacht clubs will offer a fenced area where boats are conveniently stored near the water, but without the maintenance associated with continual water storage (bottom growth, etc.) Boats in dry storage areas are either ramp-launched or hoisted into the water.

== Safety ==
Since it is a recreational activity, most boating is done in calm protected waters and during good weather. Even so, conditions can change rapidly, and a small vessel can get into life-threatening difficulties. It's important to keep an inventory of safety gear on board every boat, which is prescribed by the U.S. Coast Guard as well as state boating law administrators in the U.S. Depending on the size of the boat and how it is powered, required equipment may include:

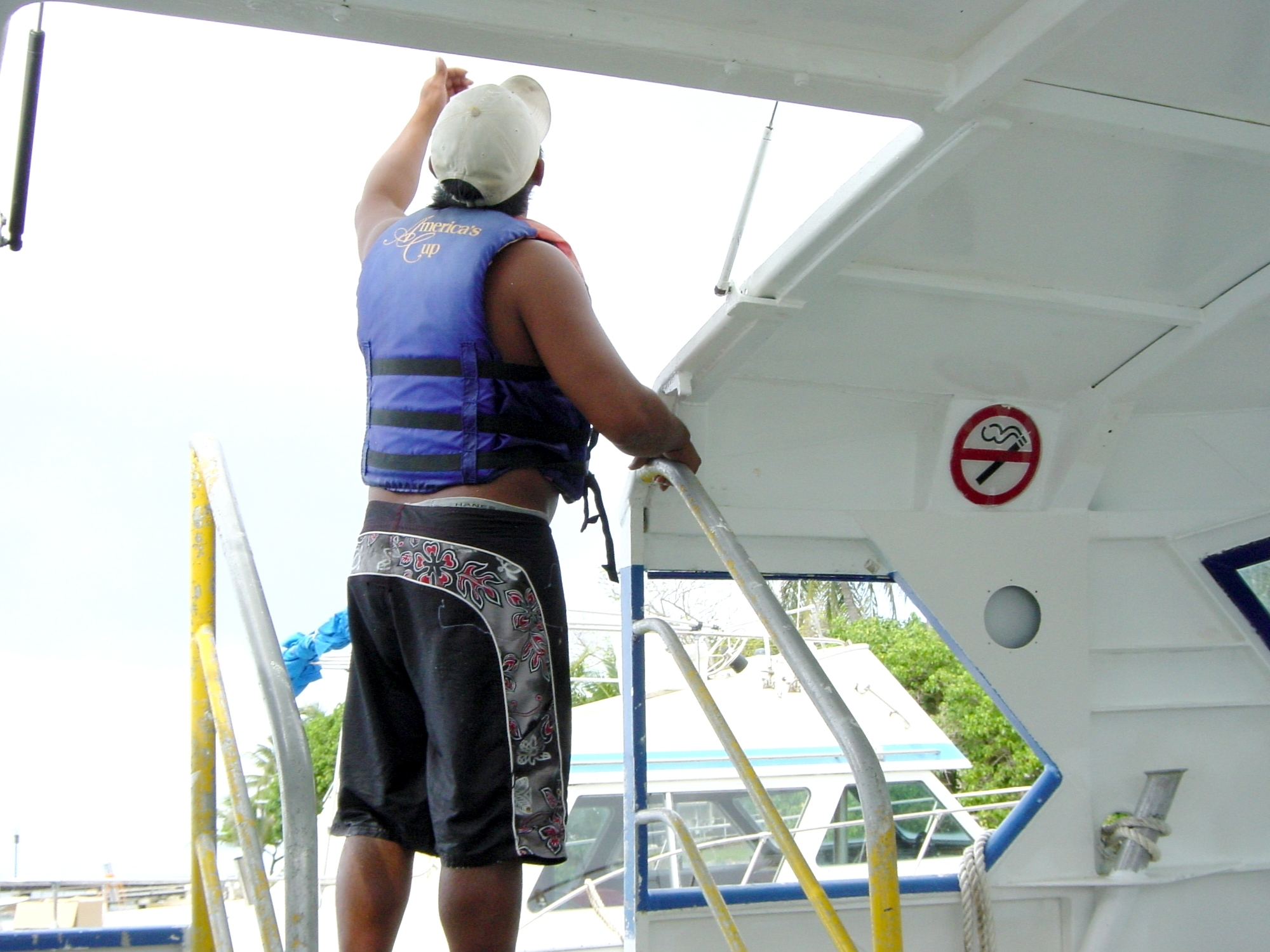
Sailor equipped with a personal flotation device

- personal flotation devices or life jackets for everyone on board
- a throwable flotation device (in the U.S., a type IV personal flotation device)
- navigation lights suitable for the type of boat operation
- visual distress signals which are effective both day and night
- sound-making devices including horns and bells
- fire extinguisher(s)
- a copy of the Inland Rules of the Road
- a VHF or long range radio

Other items might seem obvious but are not actually required by law. They include a flashlight, first aid kit, paddles, whistles, anchor and rope, engine spare parts, bilge pumps, a VHF radio or mobile phone, etc.

In addition to these safety items listed above, the Code of Federal Regulations lists some additional required items that may not fall into the common definition of "safety" items:

- backfire arresters on gasoline-powered vessels
- ventilation systems on gasoline-powered vessels
- plaques which list the penalties associated with pollution due to oil discharge, or dumping trash overboard
- a marine sanitation system (marine sanitation device) which prevents water pollution from sewage

State laws may add to this list of requirements. Most of the differences fall into a few categories:

- laws requiring life jackets to be worn in specific activities or by children
- upgraded life jackets for specific activities or by children
- restrictions on the types of marine sanitation devices that are allowed within state borders

In the United States, more than 40 states have educational requirements for operating a boat or personal watercraft on state waters. Laws vary by state so it's best to check the laws of your state. Boater education courses can be taken in-person classroom style or online at the student's convenience. Credible courses are recognized by the US Coast Guard, approved by NASBLA and work in conjunction with state agencies.

All pleasure craft operators in Canada are required to have a proof of competency (something that shows they understand the basic rules and how to safely operate a boat). A Pleasure Craft Operator Card (PCOC) is the most common proof of competency and it can be obtained by taking an online course and a Transport Canada exam.

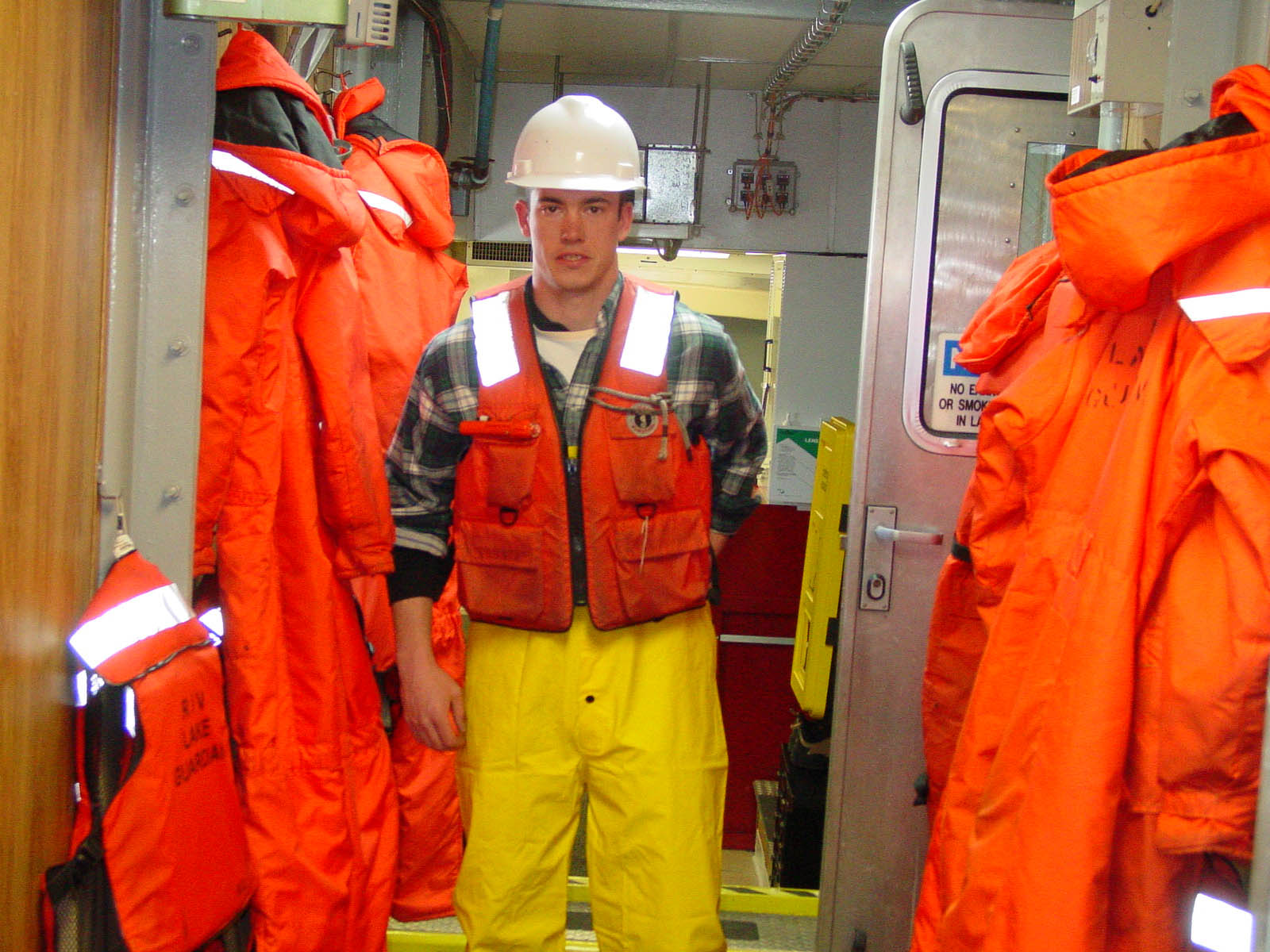
Commercial fisherman wearing a personal flotation device with pockets among other safety equipment. Likely pocket contents: A whistle (on the lanyard, left side), dye packet, shark repellent, strobe light and pen knife. A mini-flare is clipped to the 'vest' on the user's left lapel.

=== Personal flotation devices ===
Recreational boating deaths could be dramatically reduced with increased use of personal flotation devices or life jackets. Wear rates in 2003 were around 22.4%, although state and federal laws requiring children to wear flotation were more common, and therefore children's wear rates were much higher than those for adults. Relatively few children die in boating accidents; the more likely victim is an adult male in the mid-afternoon in a boat (under 20 feet length overall) who is not wearing a personal flotation device.

While various strategies have been devised in the last few decades to increase personal flotation device wear rates, the observed rate has been relatively constant. This has led to the possibility of legislation requiring personal flotation device usage on boats under a specified length when underway.

Personal watercraft have increased in popularity for the last 15 years, and account for about 70 fatalities per year (2002). However, operators of personal watercraft commonly wear personal flotation devices, and therefore have a relatively low incidence of drowning. Trauma, largely due to collisions with other vessels and the shoreline, accounts for 70% of personal watercraft fatalities while drowning accounts for about 30%.

Personal flotation device types as defined by the U.S. Coast Guard such as Type I, Type II, Type III, Type IV, and Type V can be found at the U.S. Coast Guard. In the U.S., one personal flotation device MUST be available for everyone on board. Life jacket definitions for the UK Coast Guard. In 2014, the U.S. Coast Guard announced a new labeling system for personal flotation devices, aiming to align US and Canadian standards. This new labeling system is now being introduced as the older type I-V personal flotation device labels are being phased out.

=== Drowning ===
In the United States, approximately 700 people die every year as a result of recreational boating accidents, according to the Boating Accident Reporting Database, published annually by the U.S. Coast Guard.

Alcohol use was the number one contributing factor in U.S. recreational boating deaths between 2003 and 2012, accounting for 15 percent of the fatalities in 2003, and 17 percent in 2012. A Canadian study published in 2011 examined 18 years of data on recreational boating, and concluded that a "true figure" of alcohol-related deaths in that country "may lie between 46% and 56%".

Since 1970, when recreational boating deaths in the U.S. peaked at about 1700 per year, the annual rate of fatalities has been declining at a rate of about 2% per year. The majority of these deaths (70%) occur due to drowning, and are frequently associated with small powerboat accidents. Other causes of death include trauma (especially with small powerboats), fire, carbon monoxide poisoning, and hypothermia.

The cause of the reduction of deaths is subject to some debate, but the Federal Boat Safety Act in the 1970s (effective August 10, 1971) required that boats under 20 feet (6.1 m) be equipped with level flotation. This change in boat construction meant that boaters who found themselves in the water next to a swamped boat could climb back into the boat and both reduce their likelihood of drowning, while increasing the size of a search target and reducing hypothermia. Other frequently named causes include improved boater safety education, increased use of life jackets, and improved boating safety gear.

Another potential cause for drowning is the presence of stray electrical power from a boat leaking into the water. This is known as electric shock drowning. Metal surfaces of a boat leaking power into the water can create zones of high-energy potential. Stray current entering salt water is less of a problem than the same situation in fresh water. Salt water is a good conductor and it carries current away to ground quickly. Fresh water is a poor conductor and when alternating current forms an electrical potential near a boat, the current can paralyze a swimmer. Because electrical drownings frequently present no obvious signs of injury, post-mortem examinations often fail to identify electrical shock as the cause of death. The problem can be reduced by prohibiting swimming near boats connected to shore power and ensuring marinas comply with National Fire Protection Association Standard 303 for marinas.

=== Carbon monoxide ===
In the early 2000s, several high-profile deaths due to carbon monoxide poisoning (CO) led to increased scrutiny of boating habits (especially the practice of towing participants immediately behind a boat, known as "teak surfing" or "platform towing") and the implementation of various warning placards to educate boaters of the hazards arising from these activities. Other CO-related deaths were attributed to high concentrations of CO gas from houseboat generator exhaust, where swimmers were able to access an area near the stern of the boats that collected the exhaust. This has led to improved pollution controls on modern generator sets, and changes in the designs of houseboats so that they discharge exhaust gases in a way that they can dissipate. The increased use of CO detectors, especially in boats with enclosed accommodation spaces, and a proper assessment of boat manufacturers, would help reduce the risk of CO poisoning.

In 2022, the U.S. Coast Guard reported 12 CO‐related boating fatalities, leading to new advisory placards mandating CO detectors on vessels with enclosed cabins.”

== Licensing ==
Depending on the country, boating on coastal waters and inland waters may require a licence. Usually, commercially boating on coastal waters almost always requires a licence, while recreational boating on coastal waters only requires a licence when a certain boat size is exceeded (e.g. a length of 20 meters), or when passenger ships, ferries or tugboats are steered. Boating on international waters does not require any licence, due to the absence of any laws or restrictions in this area. Some of the member states of the United Nations Economic Commission for Europe issue the International Certificate of Competence. The International Sailing License and Credentials (SLC) is a recreational sailing license valid for all yacht charter companies worldwide including Europe and the Seychelles.

== See also ==
- Yachting
- Boats
- Boat building
- Messabout
- Pleasure craft
- United States Coast Guard Auxiliary
