= Ted Towendolly =

American fly fisherman and fly tyer

- Born: Theodore Laverne Towendolly; November 17, 1901; Lakehead, California, U.S.
- Died: December 20, 1975 (aged 74); Sacramento, California, U.S.
- Occupations: Fly fisherman, fly tier, and fishing guide
- Known for: Developing short-line nymphing in the United States; Developing the Black Bomber, Spent Wing, Peacock, and Burlap fly patterns

Theodore Laverne Towendolly (November 17, 1901 – December 20, 1975) was an American fly fisherman and fly tyer. A Wintu Native American, he is known as the first fly fishing guide on the upper Sacramento River in Northern California, and for pioneering a fishing technique known today as short-line nymphing, a method used for catching trout by dropping weighted flies to the bottom of the river while holding the rod high and having out only a short amount of line.

Towendolly's technique employed heavily weighted flies he first invented in the 1920s, such as the Black Bomber, Spent Wing, Peacock, and the Burlap. These flies were later popularized and expanded upon by his friend and fellow fly fisherman Ted Fay. While Towendolly remained a fairly obscure figure, Fay achieved international fame, and spread Towendolly's inventions through his business in Dunsmuir, California. Their flies gained such recognition that they were gifted to President George W. Bush.

== Biography ==
Ted Towendolly was born on November 17, 1901, near Lakehead, California, to Garfield Towendolly and Rose Young Towendolly. His parents were part of the Wintu tribe's Tauhindauli clan (Note: During the 1880s, the family name was changed from Tauhindauli to Towendolly when a census taker, struggling with the original spelling, changed it to a similar-sounding English version that became the permanent family surname.) who settled in the Dunsmuir area sometime around the year 1850.

Not much is known about Ted Towendolly's youth except that he was adept at fishing from an early age. It is speculated this is thanks to his Wintu heritage and the influence of his uncle, John “Johnny” Towendolly, who shared a lifelong passion for fishing using, among other tools, the traditional Wintu pole spear that Ted was also known for using.

It was during the 1920s that Towendolly—in his 20s—started guiding in the Upper Sacramento river, becoming the first fly fishing guide in the area. During his time he developed well-known fly patterns like the Black Bomber, Spent Wing, Peacock, and Burlap flies. All of Towendolly's flies were heavily weighted so that they could sink fast, which was required by his distinctive fishing technique, known today as short-line nymphing.

Sometime during the 1940s, Ted Towendolly met Ted Fay, at the time a hobbyist fly fisherman. Towendolly taught him both how to tie his flies and how to fish the Upper Sacramento River using the short-line nymphing technique. The two maintained a lifelong friendship.

Over the years Ted had worked many jobs: selling flies roadside out of his truck, working for the railroad, providing small-motor repairs, and dabbling as a carpenter and handyman around town. However, his main source of income came from working as an equipment operator for the Dunsmuir Department of Public Works for 12 years, retiring in 1968. He would later move to Sacramento to work for the Sacramento Department of Public Works, still occasionally visiting Dunsmuir to fish the Upper Sacramento River.

On December 20, 1975, Ted Towendolly died of pneumonia in Sacramento at age 74. He was survived by his second wife Julia, two daughters, Betty Jane and Pat, and two stepsons.

== Legacy ==
=== Pioneering short-line nymphing in the United States ===
In the 1920s Towendolly was fishing the Upper Sacramento River with an unusual technique for the time. Until then, nymphing was usually performed with longer casts and slack in the line. In Towendolly's technique the rod is held at 45 degrees with just about a rod's length of leader sitting right at the tip of the rod, hence why it came to be known as “short-line nymphing” and “high-stick nymphing.”

The technique employs heavy, fast-sinking nymphs that can quickly reach the deep nooks found among the fast-moving waters of the rocky Upper Sacramento riverbed. These nooks are often found in pocket water, calmer areas within faster parts of the river where fish hide and feed. Usually fished with two nymphs—one at the end, with a dropper above—the flies are cast upstream of a pool that is believed to hold fish, but the heavy weight of the flies, combined with the short line, makes the cast inelegant, resulting in more of a lob. The rod is then moved across the water to match the speed of the current at the bottom of the river. Because the line and the cast are so short, the technique requires wading and frequent repositioning in order to cover water. The technique makes no use of strike indicators (which were popularized later) and to feel a strike one instead relies on the sensitivity of the line and rod, as well as other features of the line like a visible knot or coloring.

This technique closely resembles what is known today as "Czech" and "Euro" nymphing, competitive methods that developed in 1980s Eastern Europe and that have recently (in the last two decades) seen a surge in popularity, both in Europe and the USA. Despite the similarities, these European techniques developed independently, emerging in competitive fishing circuits decades after Towendolly had already started using his technique on California waters. It is unclear exactly when or how Towendolly developed this technique, but some speculate he adapted it from ancient Wintu fishing methods.

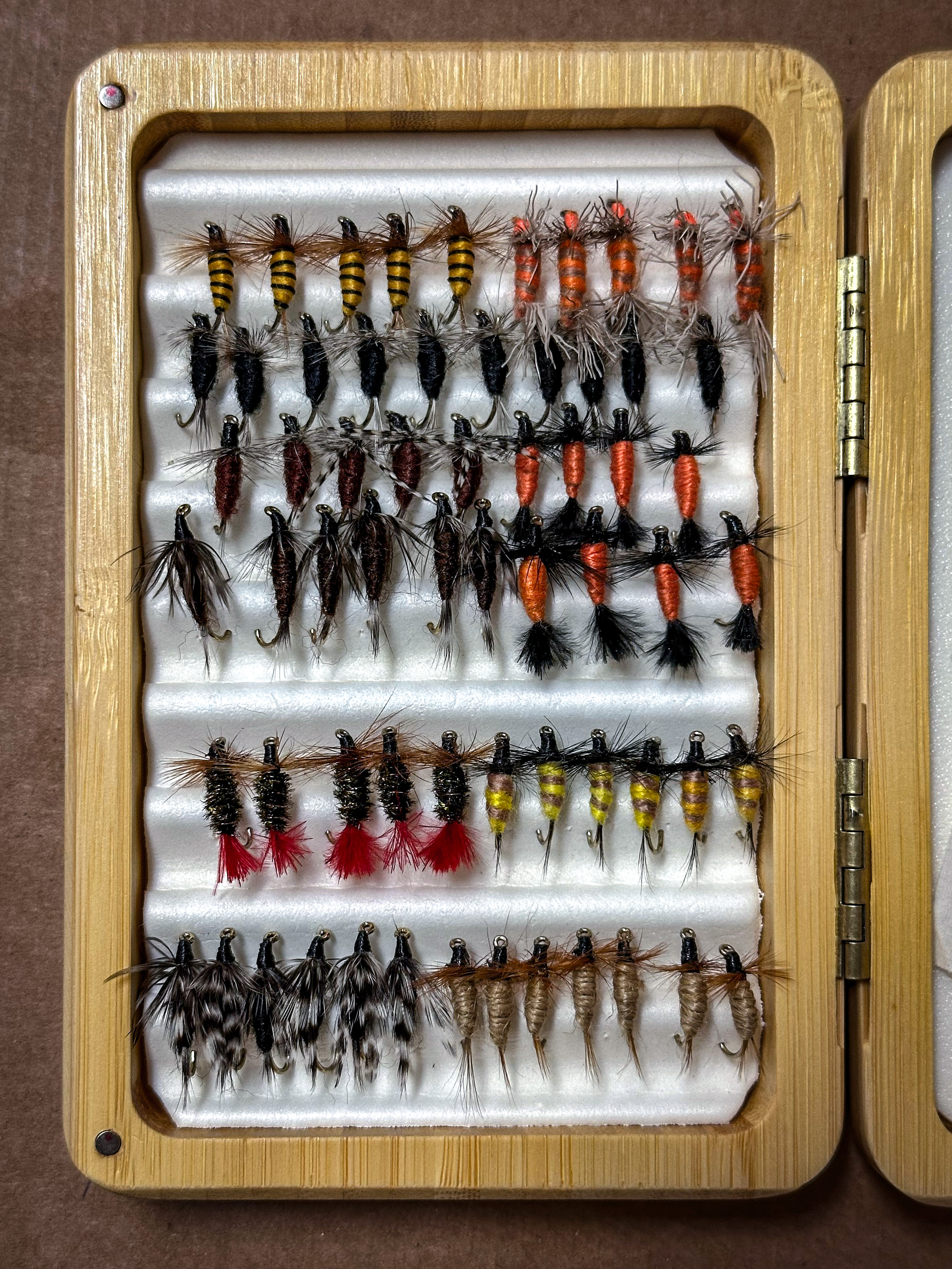
A fly box containing the Black Bomber (2nd row), Brown Bomber (3rd and 4th row, left), Peacock (5th row, left), Black Spent Wing (6th row, left), and Burlap (6th row, right).

In the 1940s Towendolly taught this technique to Ted Fay, who is credited for refining and popularizing it. While Towendolly was famous among his fellow Native Americans, Ted Fay achieved international fame, and during the 60s and 70s the technique became known as the Ted Fay method.

=== Original fly patterns ===
Towendolly created the Black Bomber fly pattern in the 1920s, and would later go on to develop other well-known fly patterns like the Black and Brown Spent Wing, the Peacock, and the Burlap flies. All of his flies were tied on a #8 Mustad 3948A hook and had an underbody composed of 10 turns of 0.25 thousand-inch lead wire. This gave the flies enough weight to sink fast in absence of today's more commonly used tungsten, which came to be isolated much later. While his flies are nymphs—flies designed to imitate young insect that dwell underwater—they employed hackle traditionally used in dry flies.

As with his short-line nymphing technique, Towendolly taught Ted Fay how to tie his flies. Fay later tied his own version of Towendolly's flies to which he later added his own creations. Popularized through Fay's fly fishing shop and guiding services, this set of flies gained considerable popularity and came to be known as the "Ted Fay flies," becoming sufficiently renowned to be presented as a gift to George W. Bush. Today both the original and variations of Towendolly's flies are being tied and used around the world.

== Sources ==
- Palmer, Eric (2017). "Ted Towendolly and the Origin of Short-Line Nymphing on the Upper Sac: How the Wintu Indians, the 49ers, Ted Fay, and Joe Kimsey Impacted Modern-day Nymphing with a Fly" (PDF). California Fly Fisher. Truckee, CA. Archived from the original (PDF) on June 19, 2024.
- O'Brien, Chip (1996). "As the Cro Flies: Patterns Born and Bred on the Upper Sac" (PDF). California Fly Fisher. Truckee, CA. Archived from the original (PDF) on May 20, 2024.
