= Guillaume Fourrier =

French professional sport fisherman

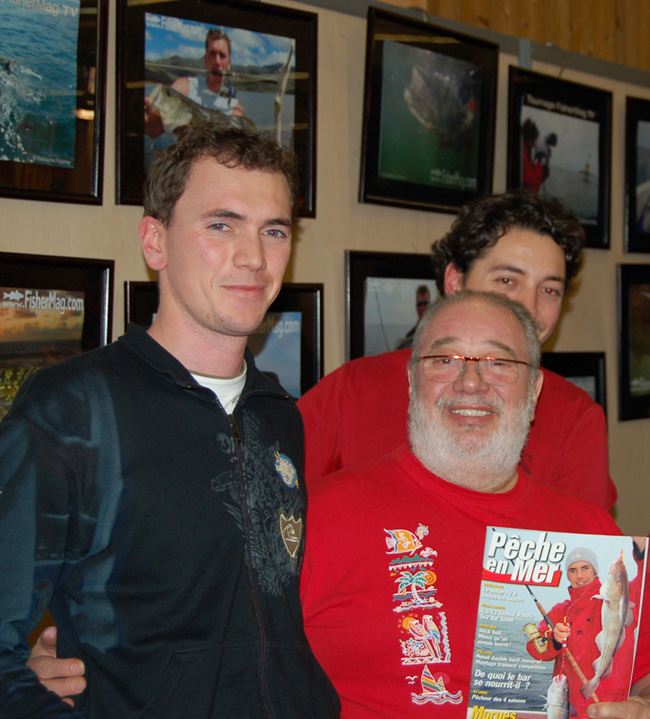
- Guillaume Fourrier and the French singer Carlos

Personal information
- Nationality: French
- Born: 3 March 1981 (age 45) Boulogne-sur-Mer, France

Sport
- Country: France
- Sport: Sport fishing

Achievements and titles
- Personal bests: World record 8.630 kg European bass (Boulogne-sur-Mer, France, 2014)...; World record 6.155 kg European bass (Boulogne-sur-Mer, France, 2011); European record 2.805 kg Plaice (Belleville-sur-Mer, France, 2011); European record 9.060 kg Cod (Boulogne-sur-Mer, France, 2011); French record 9.800 kg Pollock (La Rochelle, France, 2009); French record 4.825 kg Thornback ray (Dieppe, France, 2019)

Guillaume Fourrier (French pronunciation: [ɡijom fuʁje]; born 3 March 1981) is a French professional sport fisherman and fishing guide. In 2024, he has been approuved as an IGFA Captain. He has set 28 fishing world, European and French records. The most notable of his records related to a European bass weighing 8630 gr, save as world record from the International Game Fish Association (IGFA) in the 8 lb line category. Guillaume set 5 fishing world records, 7 fishing European records and 16 fishing French records. His favorite fish species are European bass, Pollock, Cod, Thornback ray and Turbot

== Biography ==
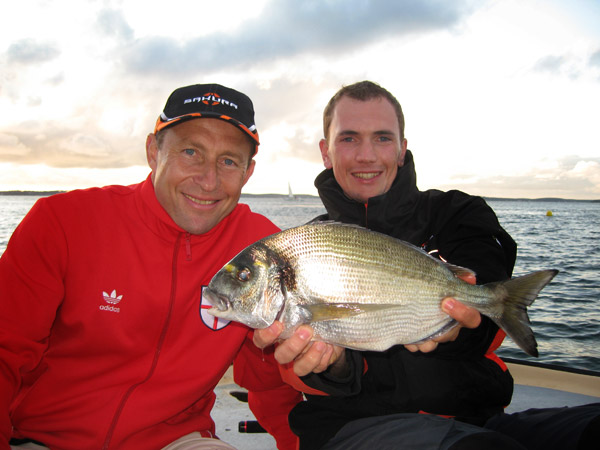
Jean-Pierre Papin, football player and sport fishing addict, and Guillaume Fourrier (on the right).

Guillaume was born in Boulogne-sur-Mer, France. He was a competitive swimmer until he was 14 and he is keen on fishing since he was 13. From 1999 to 2003, he became a lifeguard on beaches of the North-West French Coast and Corsica French island. In 2005 and 2006, he spent a few months in New Caledonia tracking tropical catches and releasing then about fishing and a number of articles since 2005. He writes article about fishing every month, especially in the "Pêche en Mer" French magazine. He usually appears on the cover of French and Spanish magazines.

He participates in Atlantic bluefin tuna tagging programmes with IFREMER and Spanish scientists

== Career ==
In 2007, he became product manager and team manager for a French brand named "Sakura", where he developed rods, reels and lures for the European lure market. From 2012 to 2021, he was the Marketing Director for the Japanese manufacturing company Daiwa (Globeride). As a sport fisherman, Guillaume is sponsored by April Marine, Beneteau and Simrad Yachting

== Books ==
- La Pêche aux Leurres, 2009, edited by Vagnon. ISBN 978-2-85725-683-0
- Toutes les Pêches en Bateau, 2011, edited by Vagnon. ISBN 978-2-85725-762-2
- La Pêche du Bar, 2012, edited by Vagnon, prefaced by Gérard d'Aboville. ISBN 978-2-85725-795-0
- La Pêche aux Appâts, 2013, edited by Vagnon, prefaced by the French actor Gérard Klein. ISBN 2857258488
- La Pêche à Pieds, 2013, edited by Vagnon. ISBN 2857258496
- Le Vagnon de la pêche en mer, 2014, edited by Fleurus. ISBN 978-2-85725-893-3
- 50 pêches faciles en Atlantique, 2015, edited by Fleurus, prefaced by Pierre Perret. ISBN 9782857259572
- Montage de lignes & nœuds de pêche, 2016, edited by Fleurus. ISBN 9791027100446
- Pêche facile en bord de mer : 40 poissons, bas de ligne et nœuds, 2017, edited by Fleurus. ISBN 9791027101375
- Le Vagnon de la pêche en mer : Espèces, techniques, matériel, montages, 2018, edited by Fleurus, prefaced by Michel Desjoyeaux. ISBN 9791027101849
- Pêche facile du bar aux appâts et aux leurres, 2021, edited by Fleurus. ISBN 979-10-271-0603-5
- Pêchez malin ! 150 astuces pour réussir toutes vos pêches, 2022, edited by Fleurus. ISBN 979-10-2710-729-2
- Pêche facile en eau douce, 2023, edited by Fleurus. ISBN 979-10-271-0745-2
