= Hans Nordin =

Hans Nordin may refer to

- Hans Nordin (curler) (born 1959), Swedish curler
- Hans Nordin (fisherman) (born 1952), Swedish fishing guide, TV host and author
- Hans Nordin (ski jumper) (born 1931), Swedish ski jumper
