= Cindy Garrison =

Cindy Garrison (born 1972) is an outdoors guide and host of the ESPN Outdoors program, Get Wild! With Cindy Garrison.

Garrison grew up in the San Francisco Bay Area mostly in Marin County, California. She also spent her summers at her parents’ ranch in Klamath Falls, Oregon. Her parents, both of whom hunt and fish, introduced her to the sports as a child. After time at Santa Barbara City College and University of the Pacific, Cindy migrated to Anchorage, Alaska in 1994, where she finished her degree in psychology, became a professional fly fishing guide, worked as a heli-ski guide, and opened Garrison Adventures International, specializing in booking travel to fishing, hunting, and skiing destinations worldwide. She'd just moved to Denver, Colorado in 1998 when she went with her father on her first African safari in Botswana. She enjoyed the experience so much Cindy ended up staying until 2003, where she ran camps for the largest hunting safari operator in Botswana, Africa as well as founding her own safari company, and then founding Safari Anglers, guiding fly-casters in pursuit of Africa's famed Tiger Fish in Botswana, Namibia, and Zambia. She still occasionally leads safaris.

In 2003, Garrison became co-host of ESPN2's In Search of Fly Water, which ran for two seasons. Her stint on this show led her current job as host of Get Wild!

In September 2006, she became an official spokeswoman for Women in the Outdoors.
