= FishingBooker =

Online marketplace for booking charter boats

FishingBooker, Inc.
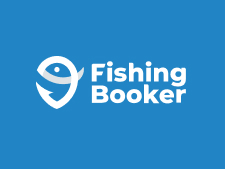
- Website type: Privately held company
- Founded: 2013; 13 years ago in Belgrade, Serbia
- Headquarters: Belgrade, Serbia
- Founder: Vukan Simic
- Key people: Vukan Simic (CEO); Dino Delic (COO)
- Industry: Recreational fishing
- Products: Online marketplace
- Website: fishingbooker.com

FishingBooker, headquartered in Belgrade, Serbia, is an online marketplace specializing in booking charter boats for recreational fishing. The company was founded by CEO Vukan Simic.

The company is described as an online travel agency for fishing charters, “the world’s largest online community” and a marketplace for connecting fishers and charters around the world, and has been compared to “Airbnb for fishing charters”.

FishingBooker publishes an annual list of the best places in the United States for fishing, and has boat listings in over 1,000 cities across more than 100 countries.

== History ==
FishingBooker was founded in 2013 by Vukan Simic in Belgrade, Serbia, after he had recently graduated from the University of Belgrade. The pair created the company to streamline boat chartering.

In 2014, Simic invested US $60,000 into the company in two rounds. He is the company's sole investor.

== Services ==
FishingBooker allows for comparison of charters which do not have any shared practices or independent ability to book online. It is similar to other services that broker boat rentals, but the site is specialized for finding, comparing and booking fishing charters, including fishing gear and the services of a captain, as well as the boat itself.

== Awards and criticism ==
In 2014, FishingBooker won the Audience Choice award at TechCrunch Disrupt SF. However, some technical writers criticized the company's site. While supporters focused on the large potential market, critics focused on the site's limited technical innovation.
