= Kite fishing =

Fishing technique

Kite fishing is a fishing technique involving a drop line hanging from a kite, attached to a lure or bait. The kite is flown over the surface of a body of water, and the bait floats near the waterline until taken by a fish. The kite then drops immediately, signaling to the fisherman that the bait has been taken, and the fish can then be hauled in. Kites can provide boatless fishermen access to waters that would otherwise be available only to boats. Similarly, for boat owners, kites provide a way to fish in areas where it is not safe to navigate - such as shallows or coral reef.

The islanders of Tobi Island use kites constructed of a large leaf stiffened by the ribs of the fronds of the coconut palm. The fishing line can be made from coconut fibre and the lure from spider webs.

Modern kite-fishing is popular in New Zealand, where large delta kites of synthetic materials are used to fish from beaches, taking a line and hooks far out past the breakers. Kite fishing is also emerging in Melbourne where sled kites are becoming popular, both off beaches and off boats and in freshwater areas. The disabled community increasingly use kites for fishing as they allow mobility-impaired people to cast the bait further than they could do otherwise. Kite fishing has become popular in South Florida for the recreational fishing of many pelagic species such as sailfish, wahoo, kingfish and tuna. This fishing technique allows anglers to create a very natural bait presentation, while simultaneously covering a large span of ocean which would otherwise be inaccessible using conventional fishing techniques. Kite fishing also affords fisherman the opportunity to fish with more than one line.

== Offshore kite fishing ==
Offshore kite fishing is a sport fishing technique used to keep live bait on the surface of the water to attract and catch surface feeding predators. It is used in Florida along the Atlantic coast and in the Caribbean for sailfish. It is also used for blackfin and yellowfin tuna, dolphin or mahi-mahi, wahoo, black grouper, and yellowtail snapper.

== Kites ==
Most boats fly two kites at once: one off of each side of the boat. Which kite to use is up to the wind speed out on the water so many captains bring a wide variety of kites. The reason these captains carry a variety of different kites is because you can not use the same kite for a high wind speed that is made for a slow wind speed. Also, captains will fly different color kites so that they can tell their crew exactly which rod is going off without leaving the steering wheel. Kites will fall into the water and have to be retrieved, rinsed with freshwater, and dried before being sent back out. When a kite falls into the water they do sink and retrieving a kite that is 10 feet under water is much harder than retrieving one that is on the surface so a lot of captains will attach a helium balloon so they will not sink and help keep it in the air. To regulate the height of the kite weights will be attached to the line or line will be taken in or let out.

Helium filled, lighter-than-air, Helikites are now used for kite fishing. They have the advantage of flying automatically and not ever falling into the water, even during launch. As their helium lasts for many weeks they are cheap to operate.

== Launch ==
The hardest part of kite fishing is the launch of the kite. On large boats where almost all of the fishing is done in the stern of the boat it is hard to launch a kite because the cabin of the boat blocks the wind from helping the kite up into the air. This is because the down draft over the cabin and tuna towers pushes on the top of the kite and forces it towards the water. On boats like these the captain will turn the boat sideways so that the wind is coming across the back of the boat for an easier launch.

== Rods, reels and bait ==
The kites are launched and retrieved on reels, occasionally electric. The rods that the kites are mounted on are super short rods with only one or two line guides on it. Line clips are then attached to the kite line and assigned a rod and reel. An experienced crew can get up to three lines on one kite. To the end of each leader is attached a neon Styrofoam marker to know which line is hooked up. These leaders are normally anywhere from 50 to 80 pound test and are about 15 feet long. Occasionally you may have to throw on a wire leader if the Wahoo or King Fish are biting.

The reels used for the tackle are usually high-capacity, open-face bait casting reels. When kite fishing you want your bait still alive so it can move along the surface and make splashes. As bait, many kite fishermen use a fish called a goggle-eye as live bait. The problem with these fish is that they are nocturnal and are caught off of the reef at night so they are hard to catch yourself but can be bought. More commonly used are Spanish Sardines, Cigar Minnows, Pilchards, and Blue Runners. Circle hooks are becoming very popular because they do very little damage to large fish. To live bait a fish you must run a wire with a hook on one end and a loop on the other and run it up the bait's back until it sticks out right before the dorsal fin. Then take the leader with a hook attached to that and put it through the loop on the wire and attach it and hook it through the fishes nose. This way the fish can still swim freely. With four to six bait fish skimming along the surface your boat is almost guaranteed to get a hook up.

When the fish does finally bite the hook and run with it the line it comes out of the clip on the main kite line and is only on the tackle rod.

Flying fish baits and lures are presented using kites because the upwards pull of the kite allows the flying fish lure to skip into the air like a real flying fish. This seems to be very attractive to tuna and other fish.

== See also ==
- Bouncer Smith
