= Jesper Nordin =

Jesper Nordin may refer to:

- Jesper Nordin (Danish conductor) (born 1975)
- Jesper Nordin (Swedish composer) (born 1971)
