= Hans Nordin (fisherman) =

Swedish television host

Hans Nordin (born 23 September 1952 in Stockholm, Sweden), is a Swedish guide, fishing guide, TV-host, and author. Nordin participated in over 40 programs on Swedish Television SVT, Swedish TV4, and TV-shows in Germany and Czechoslovakia. He is a regular contributor to Swedish and international Sport Fishing journals, including Fiskejournalen for more than twenty years.

== TV-shows and documentaries ==
- 1989-91 Fisketur (Fishing Tour with Hans Nordin) Vignette.
- Three seasons in Swedish Public Broadcast Television SVT Sommarlov ("Summer Camps"), for a total of 29 episodes, where Nordin also was programme manager and co-author of script.
- 1999-2001 Nordic Good Fishing, TV-documentary series, SVT broadcast in the TV Show Mitt i Naturen (In the Middle of Nature).
- 2003 Skärgårdstugg (Chewable Archipelago) TV series, Swedish TV4.
- 2004/05 Jakt och Fiske (Hunting and Fishing) TV series, Swedish TV4.
- 2011 Fiska lite djupare (Fishing a little deeper) TV series episode 5, Swedish TV4 sport.

== Books ==
- 1995 Wobbler, Self-Production for a Fun Sport Angling. Published in Sweden and in Germany, Austria, Switzerland
- 2001 Modern Ice Angling. Published in Sweden, Finland, North America/USA, Russia

== Awards ==
- 1989 Honorary statue - Swedish Sportfishing Federation. Host of the TV series Fisketur (Fishing Tour) 1989.
- 2006 Gold drill (Guldborren) for contributions to the Swedish ice fishing.
