= Flats fishing =

Form of recreational fishing

Flats fishing is a form of recreational fishing where anglers target species of fish specifically in shallow, wide littoral portions of a body of water (typically saltwater) known as "flats".

== History ==
While fishing shallow areas is not a modern invention, flats fishing as it is known today was developed in the 1940s in Florida and the Bahamas.

As this style of fishing has gained popularity, so has its exposure in fishing related media. One example includes a flats fishing specific television series, Flats Class, created by World Fishing Network.

== Methods ==
Fishing on flats is often done with baits, lures or light spinning tackle, or by fly fishing.

Weather changes, such as barometric pressure and ambient temperature may affect anglers' success due to effects weather has on fish feeding patterns and tide levels. Other factors contributing to an anglers success in catching fish may include sunlight and wind.

Flats fishing can be done by wading, from various types of boats including flats boats designed primarily for the activity or other watercraft such as micro-skiffs, kayaks, and paddle boards, making it accessible to a wide variety of anglers.

Some anglers may choose to hire fishing guides who are knowledgeable about the local fishing grounds and feeding patterns. The increase in popularity of flats fishing as a destination activity has created additional job opportunities for fishing guides in some destinations.

When flats fishing from a boat, a guide or other angler may stand on a "poling platform" at the stern of the boat and use a pole to guide the boat (by pushing against the sea floor) as silently as possible toward fish, which are easier to spot from the platform due to its elevation above the water.

== Locations ==
Flats fishing is a popular type of fishing in Florida particularly, which is known for its large variety of flats fish species.

Anglers may also travel to destinations to fish on the flats and perhaps especially destinations known for a certain species, such as bonefish in Andros Island of the Bahamas.

While other locations such as Christmas Island may be considered iconic destinations for traveling anglers as well, flats fishing techniques have been employed in diverse areas of the world outside of its original heritage by both local and traveling anglers.

== Targeted species ==
Saltwater fish species often targeted in the United States include redfish, snook, tarpon, bonefish, permit, pompano, sea trout, and striped bass.

Larger generally pelagic gamefish such as marlin may be targeted in some locations. Some species such as bonefish may be regulated for catch and release fishing only.
