= Ted Fay (fly fisherman) =

American fly fisherman, fly tier, guide, and store owner

- Born: August 16, 1904; Tularosa, New Mexico, U.S.
- Died: January 25, 1983 (aged 78); Dunsmuir, California, U.S.
- Occupations: Fly fisherman, fly tier, fly shop owner, and fishing guide
- Known for: The Caddis Larvae, Maggie, Yellowjacket, and Cro Fly fly patterns; Ted Fay method; Ted Fay Fly Shop

Ted Fay (1904–1983) was an American fly fisherman, fly tyer, conservationist, and fly shop owner known for popularizing the short-line nymphing fishing technique in the United States. Around 1951 he founded the Ted Fay Fly Shop, California’s oldest-running fly fishing store, located in Dunsmuir.

During his time in Dunsmuir he developed enduring fly patterns such as the Caddis Larvae, the Maggie, and the Cro Fly. He worked to promote local tourism, and is often credited with establishing the Upper Sacramento River as a fly fishing destination. In 1984, Fay was posthumously inducted into the Northern California Fly Fishing Hall of Fame for his contributions to the sport.

== Biography ==
Ted Fay was born on August 16, 1904 in Tularosa, New Mexico. Around 1914, the Fey family embarked on a trip via covered wagon to migrate to Los Angeles. Ted's father then worked as a traveling salesman, frequently taking him on his trips to Northern California. Together they visited Dunsmuir for the first time around 1920.

During the first half of the 1940s, Ted worked as a grocery distributor in Oakland, California, and would regularly drive his grocery truck through Highway 99 to fish the Upper Sacramento River.

=== Meeting Ted Towendolly ===
It was during this time that Ted Fay met Ted Towendolly, a Wintu man who had been the first fly fishing guide on the Upper Sacramento River. In the 1920s Towendolly developed heavily weighted flies such as the Black Bomber, as well as variations of the Black and Brown Spent Wing, Burlap fly, and Peacock fly. He employed these heavy flies using a novel technique that would come to be known as short-line nymphing. Towendolly taught Fay how to tie his weighted flies and fish them with his technique, fostering what would become a lifelong friendship.

=== Life in Dunsmuir ===
In the spring of 1951, Fay moved to Dunsmuir together with his wife, Vivienne Alberta Fay, and two of their four children, their son Mike Fay and daughter Shirley Mazzei. They purchased and ran the Lookout Point Motel, inside which Fay operated a small fly fishing shop.

To supply the store, Fay initially bought flies from Towendolly, but he later tied his own based on Towendolly’s recipes, as well as developing new patterns himself.

To the guests of the motel Fay offered free fishing advice and guiding services. These services proved popular, and the motel quickly became a destination among fly fishermen. Gaining international reputation over time, the motel started drawing in a clientele of famous anglers like Joe Brooks, Jack Horner, Jim Green, Walton Powell, as well as celebrities like William Conrad, Bob Wilson, Pete McCloskey, among others. Vince Claward, president of the Upper Sacramento River Exchange, a watershed stewardship organization operating in Siskiyou County, gifted a set of Ted Fay flies to then-president George W. Bush. Through his advice, guiding services, and weighted flies, Fay popularized Towendolly’s short-line nymphing technique, which came to be known in the '60s and '70s as the Ted Fay method.

While Fay was closest to the Upper Sacramento river and fished it intensely, to the point of earning the nickname of "Sage of the Sacramento", he also fished nearby trout rivers like the Klamath, Salmon, Trinity, and McCloud.

Fay was active in Dunsmuir's community and local affairs, serving as Chairman of the Chamber of Commerce’s Fish and Game committee (from December 1954) and local Rotary Club, and later president of the Dunsmuir Chamber of Commerce (from December 1959) and of the Shasta-Cascade Wonderland Association (1977–8), as well as first president of the Siskiyou Fly Fishers club. He was also a member of the Fly Fishing Federation and Ducks Unlimited.

Ted campaigned and raised funds for conservation causes, including the Nature Conservancy fly-fishing only section of the McCloud River. He practiced and taught catch and release.

Fay also regularly published fishing reports for the Sacramento and McCloud rivers in Californian newspapers such as the San Francisco Examiner, The Sacramento Bee, the Oakland Tribune, and the Los Angeles Times. His goal was bolstering local tourism and putting the Upper Sacramento area (and specifically Dunsmuir) on the map as a fly-fishing destination, an effort that proved successful.

The Lookout Point Motel lasted until 1971, when the state of California purchased it through eminent domain to make way for the Interstate Highway 5. Fay then relocated the fly fishing store to his home’s garage.

Later in his life Fay faced health issues: he had his bladder removed due to a cancer, and he suffered a heart attack during a banquet in his honor. Ultimately, Fay died of a stroke on January 25, 1983, at the age of 78. He was survived by his son Mike, step-son Tom Bowers, daughter Shirley Mazzei, and his 14 grandchildren.

== Legacy ==
=== Ted Fay method ===
What came to be known as the Ted Fay method is a fishing technique similar to Czech and Euro nymphing that developed independently in the Upper Sacramento region in the 1920s thanks to Ted Towendolly. While Fay learned this technique from Towendolly, Fay is widely acknowledged for refining it and popularizing it through his guiding services and fly shop, to the point of becoming synonymous with his name during the '60s and '70s.

=== Ted Fay flies ===
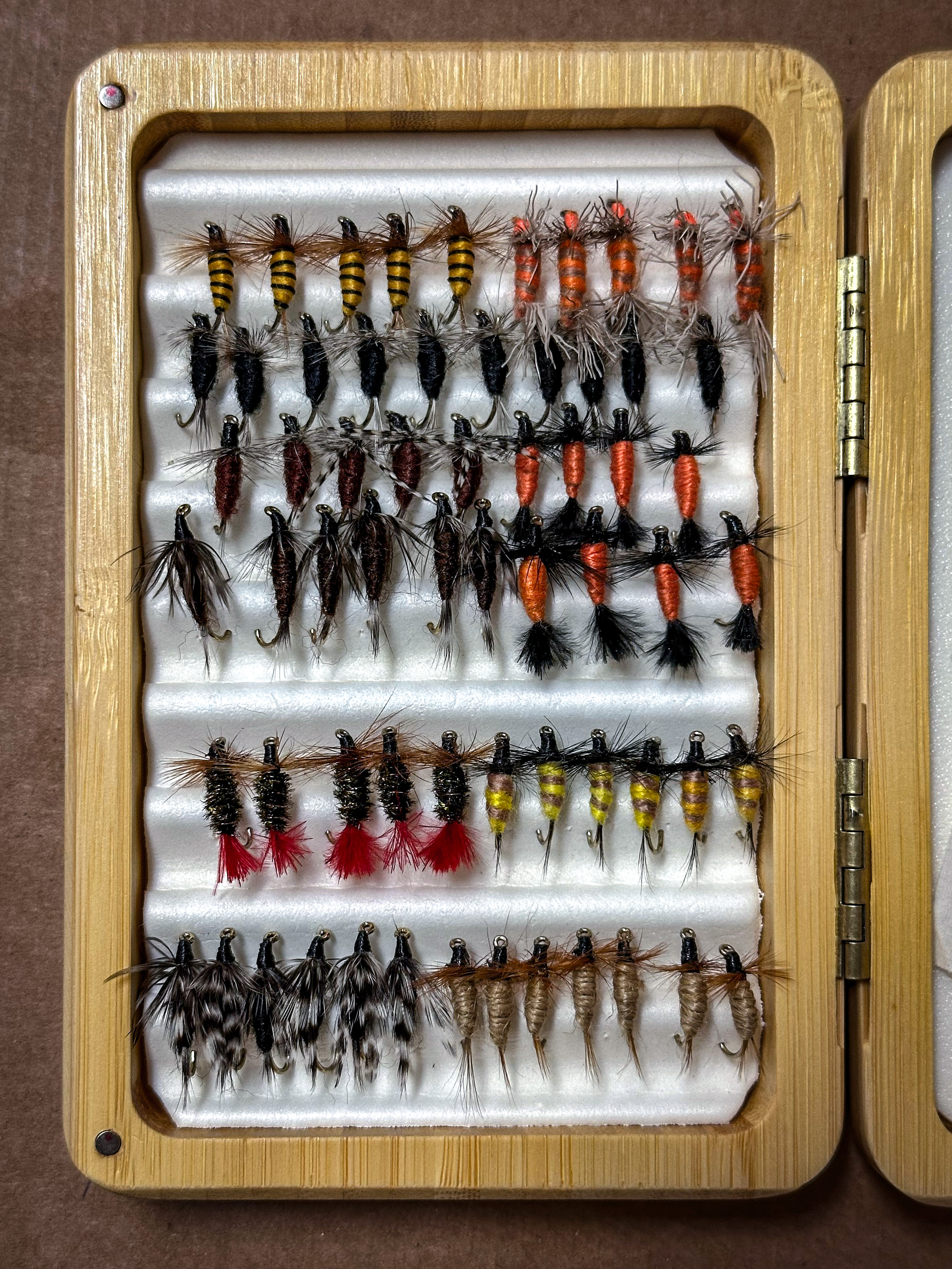
A fly box containing the Yellowjacket (1st row, left), Maggie (1st row, right), and Caddis Larvae (5th row, right).

Fay became famous for the heavily weighted flies he used for short-line nymphing, as the sign hung on the window of the Ted Fay Fly Shop used to suggest: “Weighted Flies by Ted Fay”. While some of the more unique flies he sold at his shop were replicas of flies he learned to tie from Towendolly, Fay also developed a handful of original patterns that have endured in the Upper Sacramento tradition, namely the Caddis Larvae, the Maggie, the Yellowjacket and the Cro Fly. The latter was first developed by his friend Frank Crosetti who gave Fay permission to copy and sell it. Fay modified it by removing its wings, and named it “Cro Fly” after his friend’s surname.

Vivienne, his wife, suggested that Ted could make a "buggy" looking fly out of the scraps of carpet that Ted used to glue to the soles of his waders. Named by Vivienne, the Carpetbagger fly was born. The fly proved effective and became one of Ted's favorites.

During the 70s and 80s, Fay’s flies proved so popular that imitations were being sold at other fly shops. To counter this, Fay started using the Mustad #9 hook, an unusual size that would make his original flies easier to identify. Mustad would eventually discontinue its #9 hook, and Fay was forced to go back to a #8.

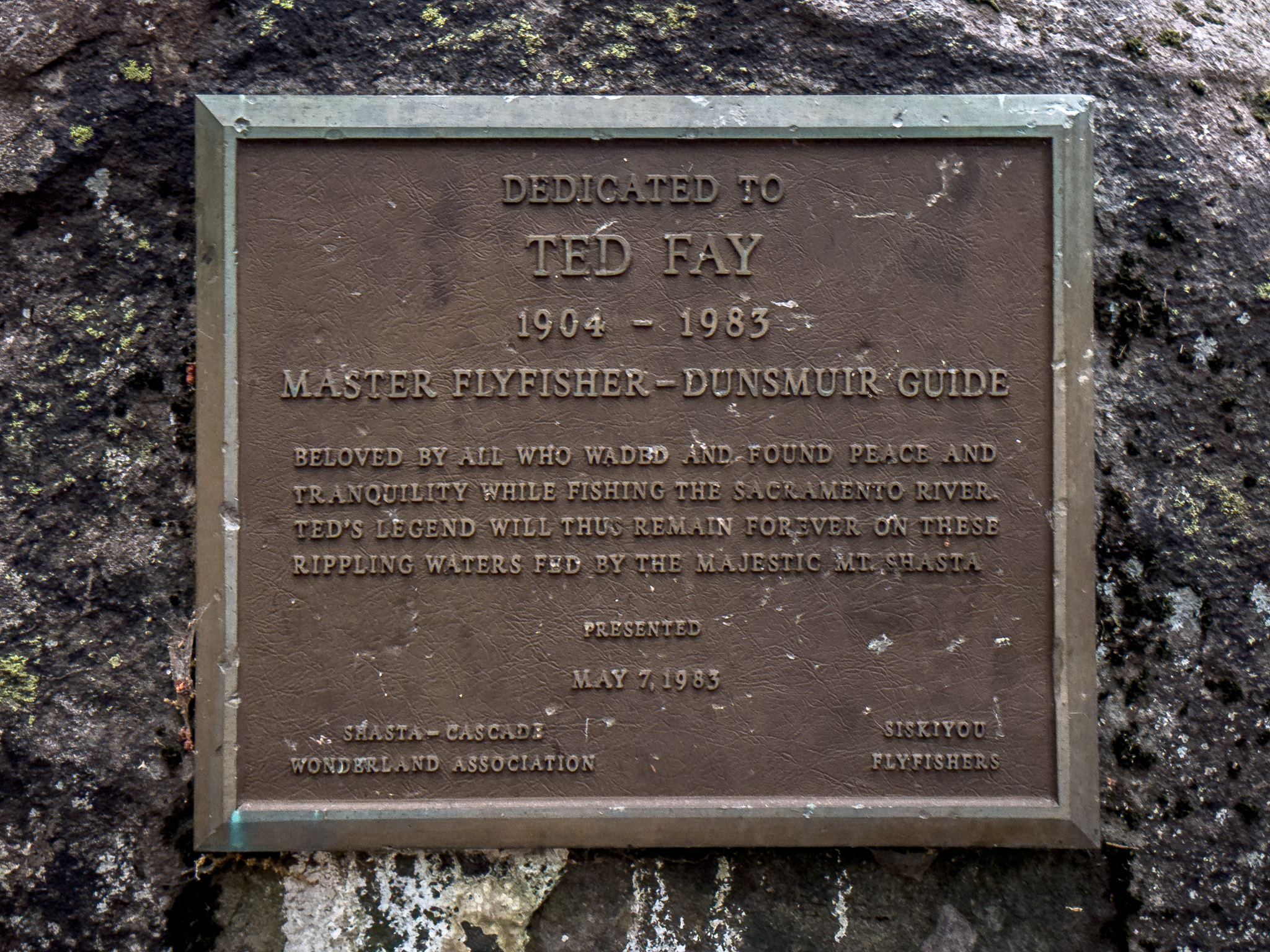
A plaque located in Dunsmuir City Park commemorating fly fisherman Ted Fay

=== Ted Fay Fly Shop ===
The Ted Fay Fly Shop is the longest-running fly fishing store in California, and one of the oldest overall in the Western United States. After Fay’s death, Joe Kimsey, a fly fisherman who worked for Fay as a fly tier and guide at the shop, bought the store from the Fay estate and operated it out of the Garden Motel, later renamed to the current Acorn Inn. In 1997, after a five-way bypass heart surgery, Kimsey sold the business to Bob Grace, who continued manning the shop and promoting Fay's techniques for 29 years, until the beginning of 2026 when he sold the store to the current owners, Corey Allen and Jessica Kenny. Throughout its history the store moved five times across Dunsmuir, until March 2007 when it relocated to its current location at 5732 Dunsmuir Avenue, following a ribbon cutting ceremony by the Dunsmuir Chamber of Commerce.

=== Posthumous recognition ===
In 1984, Ted Fay was posthumously honored by the Northern California Council of the Federation of Fly Fishers with the induction into the Northern California Fly Fishing Hall of Fame.

A memorial plaque in Dunsmuir City Park, just across the Upper Sacramento River, celebrates Ted Fay as a “master flyfisher [and] Dunsmuir guide” whose “legend will remain forever on these rippling waters”.

== Sources ==
- Raymond, Frank E. (1988). Rivers to remember: A guide to Northern California's great outdoors : historical folklore plus factual information about famous & little known places. Siskiyou Trail Press. pp. 26, 64–66. ISBN 9780962161407.
- Palmer, Eric (2017). "Ted Towendolly and the Origin of Short-Line Nymphing on the Upper Sac: How the Wintu Indians, the 49ers, Ted Fay, and Joe Kimsey Impacted Modern-day Nymphing with a Fly" (PDF). California Fly Fisher. Truckee, CA. Archived from the original (PDF) on 2024-06-19.
- O'Brien, Chip (1996). "As the Cro Flies: Patterns Born and Bred on the Upper Sac" (PDF). California Fly Fisher. Truckee, CA. Archived from the original (PDF) on 2024-05-20.
