= Messabout =

Informal boating event

A messabout is an event where a group of people get together to discuss and "mess about" in boats.

The term is derived from the children's book The Wind in the Willows by Kenneth Grahame. In the story, Mole and Rat are rowing up the river in Rat's boat. They are discussing nautical things and life in general when Rat is heard to utter the following:

Believe me, my young friend, there is nothing — absolutely nothing — half so much worth doing as simply messing about in boats. Simply messing... about in boats — or with boats. In or out of ’em, it doesn't matter. Nothing seems really to matter, that's the charm of it. Whether you get away, or whether you don't; whether you arrive at your destination or whether you reach somewhere else, or whether you never get anywhere at all, you're always busy, and you never do anything in particular; and when you've done it there's always something else to do, and you can do it if you like, but you'd much better not.

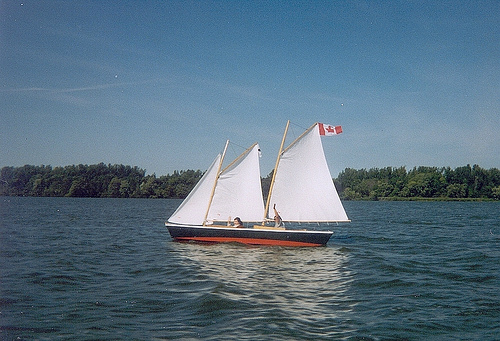
A 19'6" Phil Bolger-designed bald-headed knockabout schooner Shrike sailing to windward on port tack, near Kingston Ontario. The specific design is known as the "His and Her" or "Singlehanded" schooner.

Messabouts are usually attended by a group of people who have taken up boat building, boating and all things boat-related as their primary hobby. "Messabouts" is replaced in UK especially on canals by "banter" and the emphasis will be more on talk and camaraderie than actually doing anything constructive.
