= Flats boat =

Flats boat with poling platform

Flats boats are a category of boat designed primarily for fishing in protected, shallow water areas often referred to as "flats" by anglers.

While the name may be misconstrued to mean the boat hull is flat, this is not generally the case and include various v-hull designs. However some flats boats designs, sometimes called skiffs are truly a flat-bottomed boat design.

The deadrise (which, simplified, is a measure of the angle of bottom in v-hull boats) of most flats boats is generally a small angle because larger deadrise often requires more water displacement which increase the boat's draft and is not desirable for flats boats in shallow water. However, lower deadrise may produce a rougher ride in choppy water than a comparable boat with larger deadrise angle.

== Common Features ==
Flats boats are often small easily trailerable boats although some may reach up to 23 ft in length or more. They are typically equipped with outboard motors and offer a relatively shallow draft compared to other boats of the same length, to allow for passage over sandbars, oyster beds or other submerged objects or underwater features with less risk of damaging the hull or engine.

Some flats boats may be equipped with features such as a "jack plate" which allow the operator of the boat to lift the outboard vertically in addition to the tilt and trim mechanisms generally offered by many outboard motors. They may also be equipped with trim tabs. Both jack plates and trim tabs can offer an advantage in shallow water starts to plane among other uses. Additionally, some flats boats may be equipped with a "poling platform" which allows for a fishing guide or other person to push the boat in shallow water while an angler fishes from the bow.

Flats boats may be designed as an open cockpit and tiller controlled outboard motor, a side console or center console.

== Micro-skiffs ==
Micro-skiffs (which are, generally, a smaller and lighter, no-frills design similar to a number of flats boats) may be considered by some as a subcategory of flats boat.

== Safety Concerns ==
Some concerns have been raised about the safety of certain designs of flats boats, particularly the tunnel vee, according to a USCG study in 2013.

Tunnel vee boats, sometimes referred to as tunnel hull boats, are a design in which the center of the boat hull is essentially cut out for some length into a shape which may be somewhat similar to a catamaran in that in that section the boat hull may resemble sponsons instead of coming to a "vee" shape at the bottom. This design allows for mounting (or raising with a jack plate) the outboard motor higher while still allowing significant water flow to the propeller and the motor's cooling water intake. One advantage of this design is when operating the boat at speed in shallow waters with the engine raised where there is less restriction for the upward flow of water to the outboard motor's cooling water intake.

== See also ==
- Skiff
