= Jonas Nordin =

Swedish author and historian (born 1968)

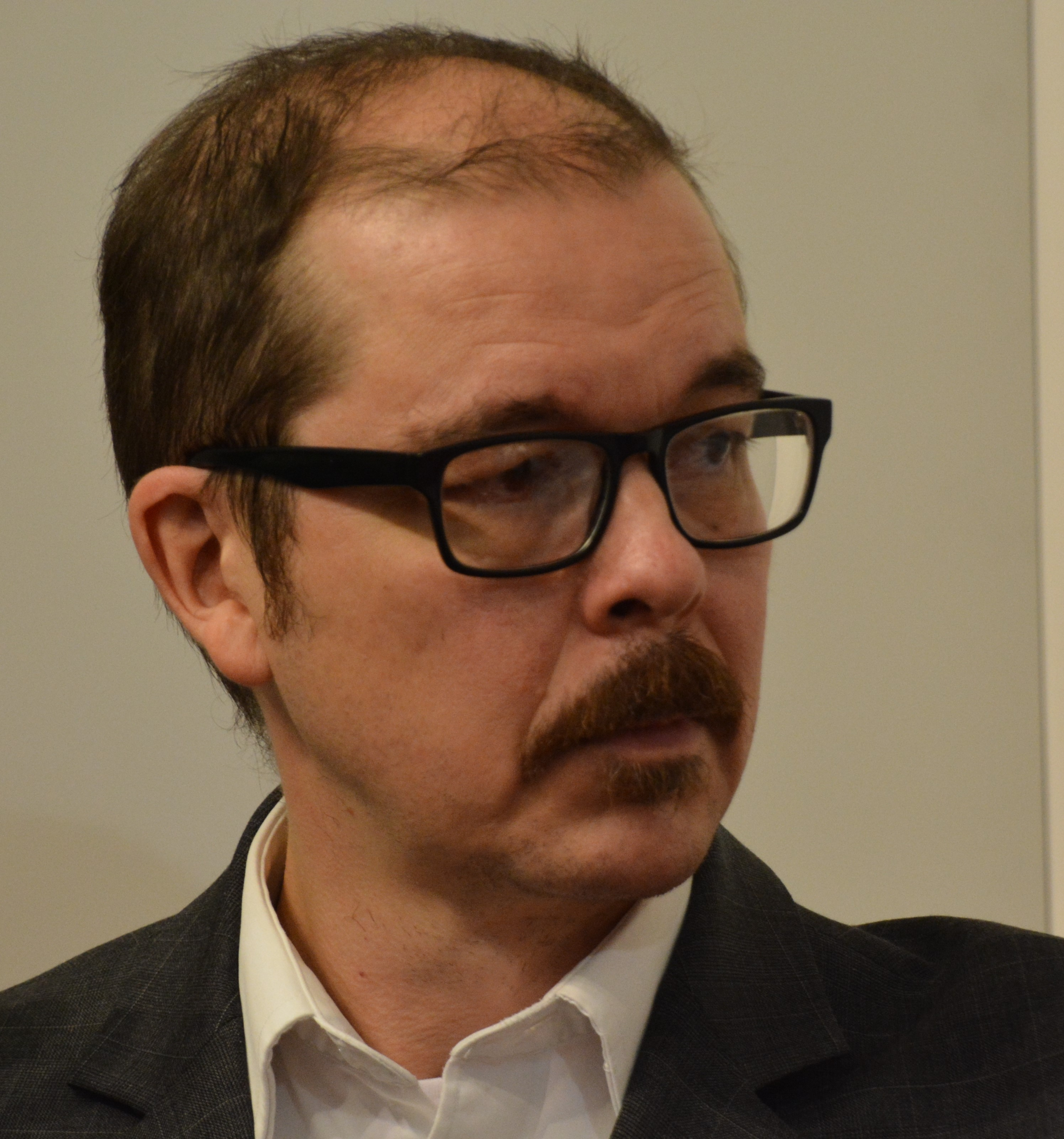
- Jonas Nordin, Gothenburg Book Fair, 2016.
- Born: 1968 (age 57–58); Sweden
- Education: Stockholm University (Ph.D.)
- Awards: Clio Prize (2003); Swedish Academy Gustavian Stipendium (Svenska Akademiens gustavianska stipendium) (2014)
- Scientific career
- Fields: History
- Workplaces: Stockholm University; National Library of Sweden; Lund University (from 2018)

Jonas Nordin (born 1968) is a Swedish author and historian, and from October 2018 professor in History of books and Libraries at Lund University.

== Biography ==
Nordin studied history at Stockholm University, and was awarded his Ph.D. in 2000 for his dissertation Ett fattigt men fritt folk. Nationell och politisk självbild i Sverige från sen stormaktstid till slutet av frihetstiden (English title: A poor but free people) (2000), an investigation of the public national and political orientation during Swedish "Great Power Era" (Stormaktstiden) and Age of Liberty (frihetstiden).

He became docent 2009 and from 1 October 2018 professor in History of books and Libraries at Lund University.

Nordin has received the Swedish literary award Clio Prize (2003), and the Swedish Academy Gustavian Stipendium (Svenska Akademiens gustavianska stipendium) (2014).

== Selected publications ==
- Versailles: slottet, parken, livet, Norstedts, Stockholm 2013, ISBN 9789113025254
- Frihetstidens monarki. Konungamakt och offentlighet i 1700-talets Sverige, Atlantis, Stockholm 2009, ISBN 9789173532921
- Ett fattigt men fritt folk. Nationell och politisk självbild i Sverige från sen stormaktstid till slutet av frihetstiden, B. Östlings bokförl. Symposion, Eslöv 2000, ISBN 91-7139-486-9
