= United States Coast Guard Charter Boat Captain's license =

A United States Coast Guard Charter Boat Captain's Credential refers to the deck officer qualifications on a Merchant Mariners Credential which is a small book that looks similar to a passport and is issued by United States Coast Guard for professional mariners in the United States commanding commercial passenger vessels up to 100 gross tons as a Master, captain or skipper. It may contain a sailing endorsement for sailing vessels and/or a commercial towing endorsement for vessels engaged in assistance towing.

There are four main categories of licenses, some of which have subcategories:

- OUPV (Operator of Uninspected Passenger Vessels - Also known as Six Pack) Credential
- OUPV Limited Credential
- Limited Master Credentials
- Master Credentials

== Operator of Uninspected Passenger Vessels License ==
The Operator of Uninspected Passenger Vessels (OUPV) License, commonly referred to as a 6-Pack License, For the purpose of the OUPV endorsement an uninspected passenger vessel is a vessel of less than 100 GRT (about 65 to 100 feet) carrying six or fewer passengers for hire. The vessel's professional crew are not included in the 6 passenger limit. It is quite popular and can be endorsed with Master's Upgrades rated by tonnage of 25 Gross Tons, 50 GT, or 100 GT increments. The Master's upgrade allows the holder to operate inspected vessels as well as uninspected ones. The total number of passengers is limited to six or fewer. Non U.S. citizens may be restricted to undocumented vessels with a 5 net ton limit. OUPV, Near coastal is limited to 100 nautical miles offshore.

Typically, an OUPV Credential is used in the context of small-scale fishing boats, SCUBA boats, whale-watching, and the like.

To obtain an OUPV Credential, 360 days’ experience on Inland or Near Coastal waters is required. Of the 360 total days:

- 90 days must be within the last 3 years
- 90 days must be on Great Lakes if the applicant wants to obtain a Great Lakes Rating on the license
- 90 days must be on Near Coastal waters to obtain a Near Coastal Rating, which also qualifies for Inland and the Great Lakes.

== OUPV Limited Credential ==
The OUPV Limited License is a very specific license granted for the purpose of operating uninspected vessels in a limited area for a specific purpose or set of purposes. It is commonly referred to as a "launch tender license," as one of its most popular uses is to ferry boaters to and from their yacht club dock to their own boat on a mooring.

To obtain an OUPV Limited Credential, one must demonstrate 90 days within the past 3 years on a vessel of appropriate tonnage and type. In addition, one must demonstrate having satisfactorily completed a Safe Boating Course approved by either the United States Coast Guard or the National Association of State Boating Law Administrators (NASBLA).

== Limited Master Credential ==
The Limited Master Credential is the equivalent of the OUPV Limited License, with the important distinction that the operator is licensed for boats that have passed a Coast Guard Inspection and have an inspection sticker on display. This license caps at 100 Gross Tons.

The base requirements for the Limited Master Credential are very similar to the OUPV Limited. The applicant must demonstrate 120 days of service (90 days within the past 3 years) in the type of vessel the operator will be handling. One must also complete a Safe Boating Course (USCG or NASBLA approved).

The tonnage of the license is determined by the tonnage of the vessels on which the applicant declared his/her sea time. Tonnage is granted as either 25GT, 50GT or 100GT.

In addition, the license offers an Auxiliary Sail endorsement, meaning that if one can demonstrate 120 days of service on vessels powered by sail or auxiliary sail, the license will be extended to allow the licensee to operate sail-powered vessels.

== Master, 100 Tons Credential ==
The Master, 100 Ton License allows the licensee to operate Coast Guard inspected vessels of up to 100GT, or may be granted in 50GT or 25GT increments. This license allows the operator to have as many passengers as the inspected vessel is certified to carry (this does not authorize more than six passengers on an uninspected vessel). A Master 100/50/25 ton may also operate uninspected vessels of up to 100GT as allowed under the OUPV credential.

In order to qualify for a Master, 100/50/25 Ton license, one must demonstrate at least 720 days of service (90 within the past 3 years) on any vessel.

There are two different variables in this license; tonnage and distance offshore.

Tonnage granted is determined by the tonnage of the vessels in which the applicant's sea time is declared.

Distance offshore is one of five possibilities with only four available for a Master 100/50/25 Ton credential:

- Rivers - No special requirements beyond the standard 360 days.
- Inland - No special requirements beyond the standard 360 days.
- Great Lakes and Inland - For this sublicense, 90 of the 360 days declared must be on Great Lakes waters.
- Near Coastal - For this sublicense, one must demonstrate the standard 360 days, but also at least 360 additional days in near-coastal or ocean waters. Master, Near Coastal is limited to 200 nautical miles offshore.
- Oceans - This endorsement is not available for Master 100/50/25 ton. Mariners wishing to operate vessels beyond the restrictions of a near coastal (200 nautical miles offshore) license must meet the requirements for the 200 ton license.

The Master, 100/50/25 Ton Credential also offers the Auxiliary Sail endorsement and an Assistance Towing endorsement. For an Auxiliary Sail endorsement, 360 days of service on sail- or auxiliary-sail vessels must be demonstrated. For the Assistance Towing endorsement, a separate exam must be passed. The Assistance Towing endorsement must not be confused with Apprentice Mate (Steersman)/Mate (Pilot)/Master of Towing Vessels Licenses for commercial towing vessels such as tug boats, ATBs and ITBs. The Assistance Towing Endorsement only allows the holder to provide assistance towing of disabled vessels for consideration within the scope and limitations of the license held such as the services provided to recreational vessels by Sea Tow and Tow Boat U.S.

Bareboat Charter

Title 46 United States Code (USC) 2101,

46 Code of Federal Regulations (CFR) 175.400, 46 CFR 24.10

are on to their own rules and regulations.
