= Merchant Navy (United Kingdom) =

Merchant marine service of the United Kingdom

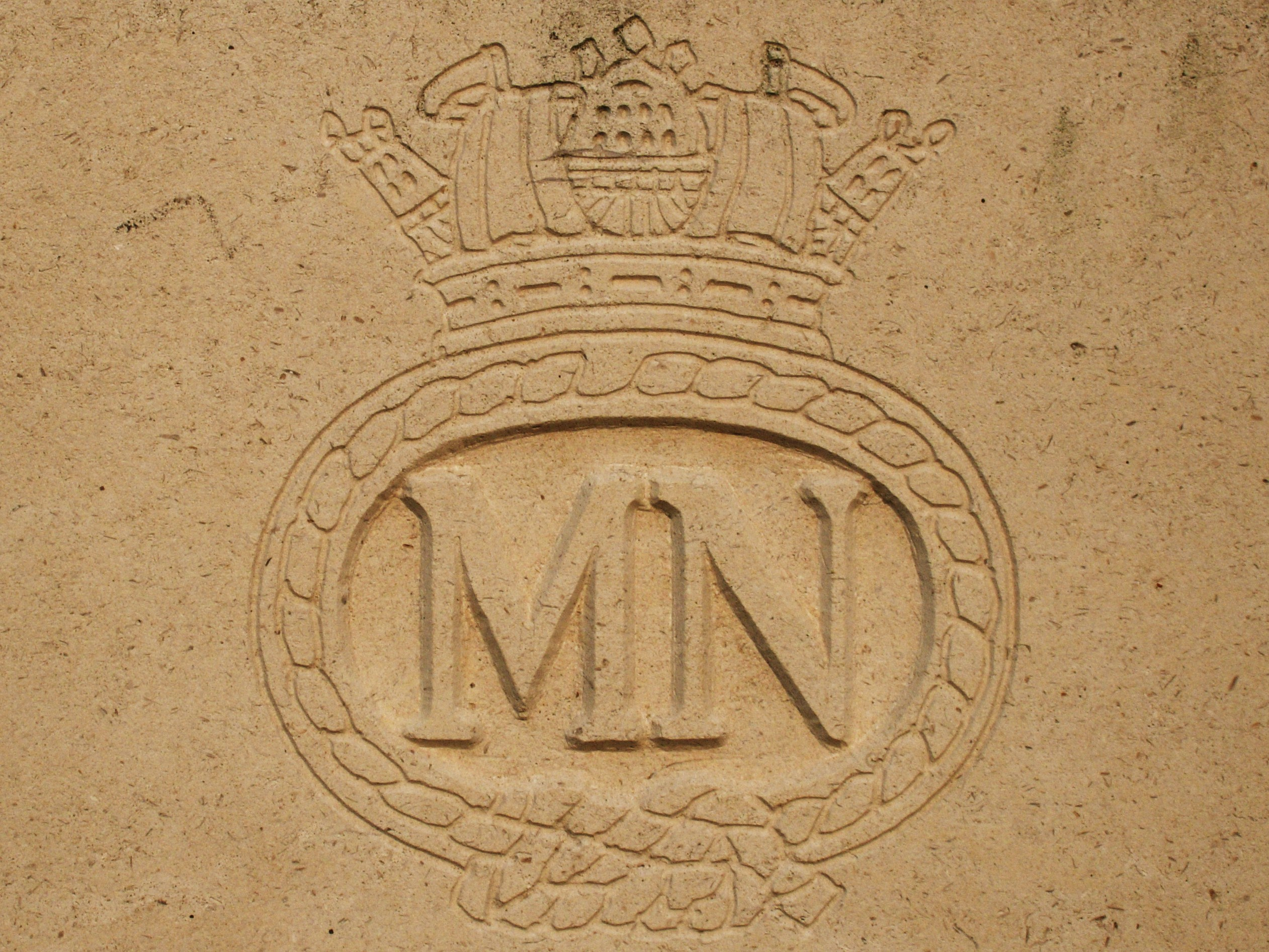
- Active: 17th century–present
- Country: United Kingdom, British Overseas Territories and Channel Islands
- Type: Civilian
- Role: Create wealth for the crown, country and shipowner; Support the British military when required; To help create and maintain diplomatic relationships
- Size: 10th-largest; 30 million gross tons; 40.7 million deadweight tonnage
- Anniversaries: Merchant Navy Day (3 September); Battle of the Atlantic (May); Trafalgar Day (21 October)
- Fleet: Cargo; Passenger; Special purpose vessels
- Engagements: U-boat Campaign (1914–1918); Battle of the Atlantic (1939–1944); Arctic convoys of World War II (1941–1945); Operation Pedestal (1942); Falklands War (1982); Gulf War (1991)

Insignia
- Red Ensign

- Civil Jack

The Merchant Navy (MN) is the collective name given to British civilian ships and the officers and ratings that man them. Merchant Navy vessels mostly fly the Red Ensign and the ships and ship's companies' are regulated by the Maritime and Coastguard Agency (MCA), a specialist agency of the UK Department of Transport. British merchant ships are registered under the UK or Red Ensign group ship registries. British Merchant Navy deck officers and ratings are certificated and trained according to STCW Convention and the syllabus of the Merchant Navy Training Board in maritime colleges and other training institutes around the UK.

King George V bestowed the title of "Merchant Navy" on the British merchant shipping fleets following their service in the First World War; a number of other nations have since adopted the title. Previously it had been known as the Mercantile Marine or Merchant Service, although the term "Merchant Navy" was already informally used from the 19th century.

The British Merchant Navy was historically one of the largest ship registries and source of crew in the world, with 33% of global tonnage registered in 1939. However, since the mid-20th century, the number of shipowners, ships, officers and crew have declined dramatically, as a result of globalisation and the rise of flags of convenience. As of 2023, the British Merchant Navy numbered 1,054 ships.

The current Flagship of the MN is the Cunard Ocean Liner RMS Queen Mary 2 a role she has held since she entered service in 2004 taking over from the older RMS Queen Elizabeth 2, coincidentally QM2 also became the Flagship of Cunard upon entering service.

== History ==
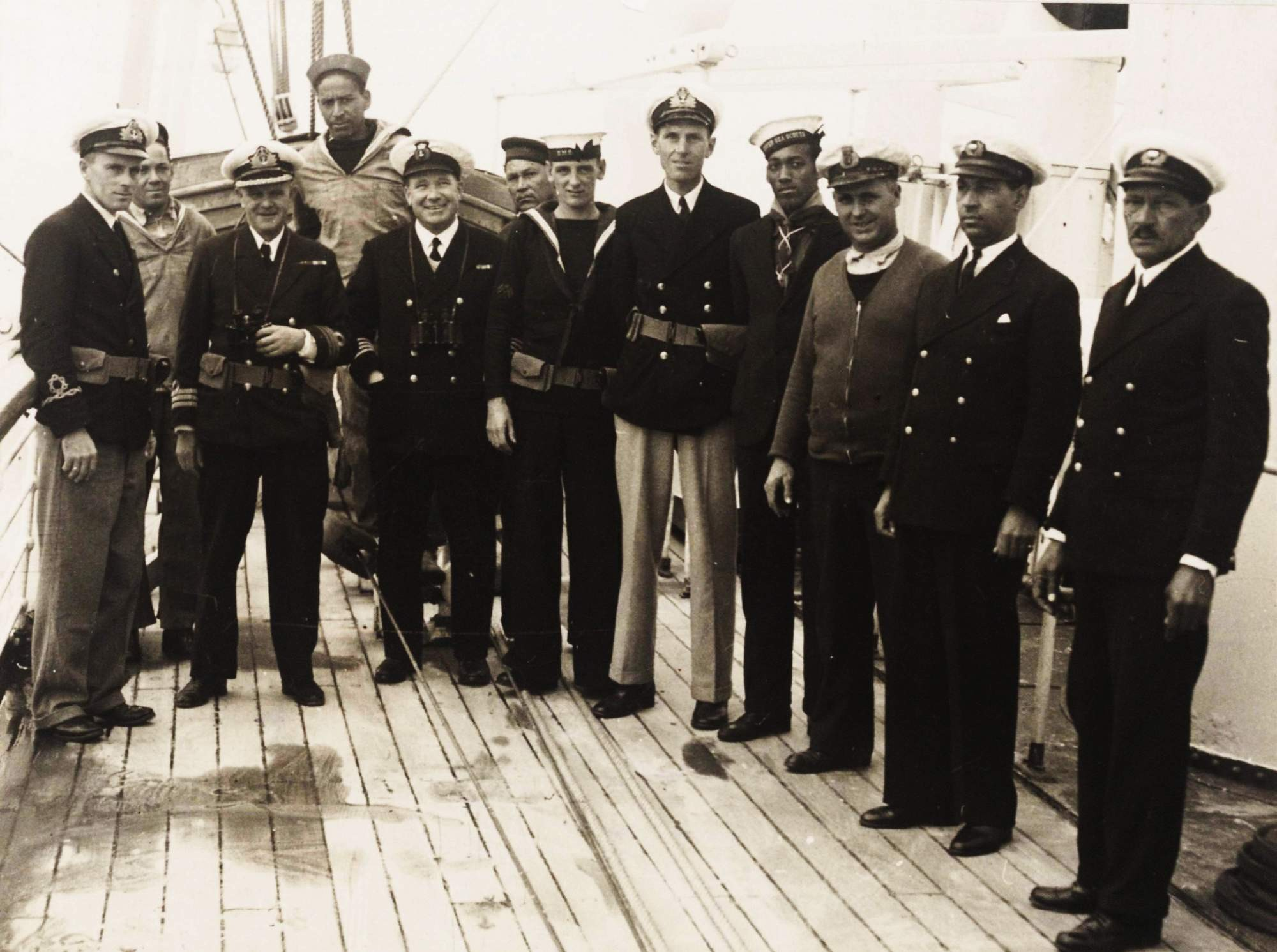
Members of the ship's company of HMS Castle Harbour, assigned to the Royal Naval Dockyard as the Examination Service vessel (that inspected merchant ships). Crew members included seafarers from the Merchant Navy. HMS Castle Harbour would later be sunk by a German submarine while being delivered to the Mediterranean by a Merchant Navy crew

The Merchant Navy has been in existence for a significant period in English and British history, owing its growth to trade and imperial expansion. It can be dated back to the 17th century, when an attempt was made to register all seafarers as a source of labour for the Royal Navy in times of conflict. That registration of merchant seafarers failed, and it was not successfully implemented until 1835. The merchant fleet grew over successive years to become the world's foremost merchant fleet, benefiting considerably from trade with British possessions in India and the Far East. The lucrative trades in sugar, contraband opium to China, spices, and tea (carried by ships such as the Cutty Sark) helped to entrench this dominance in the 19th century.

In the late 19th and early 20th centuries, maritime education expanded to train merchant navy officers. For example, in 1855 Leith Nautical College provided training for seafarers in Scotland. Other maritime colleges developed in this period included the South Tyneside Marine and Technical College, founded 1861 (now the South Tyneside College) and the Southampton School of Navigation, 1902 (now the Warsash Maritime School).

In the First and Second World Wars, the merchant service suffered heavy losses from German U-boat attacks. A policy of unrestricted warfare meant that merchant seafarers were at risk of attack from enemy ships. The tonnage lost to U-boats in the First World War was around 7,759,090 tons, and around 14,661 merchant seafarers were killed. In honour of the sacrifice made by merchant seafarers in the First World War, George V granted the title "Merchant Navy" to the companies.

In 1928 George V gave Edward, Prince of Wales the title of "Master of the Merchant Navy and Fishing Fleets"; which he retained after his accession to the throne in January 1936 and relinquished only at his abdication that December. Since Edward VIII, the title has been held by the sovereigns George VI and Elizabeth II. When the United Kingdom and the British Empire entered the Second World War in September 1939, George VI issued this message:

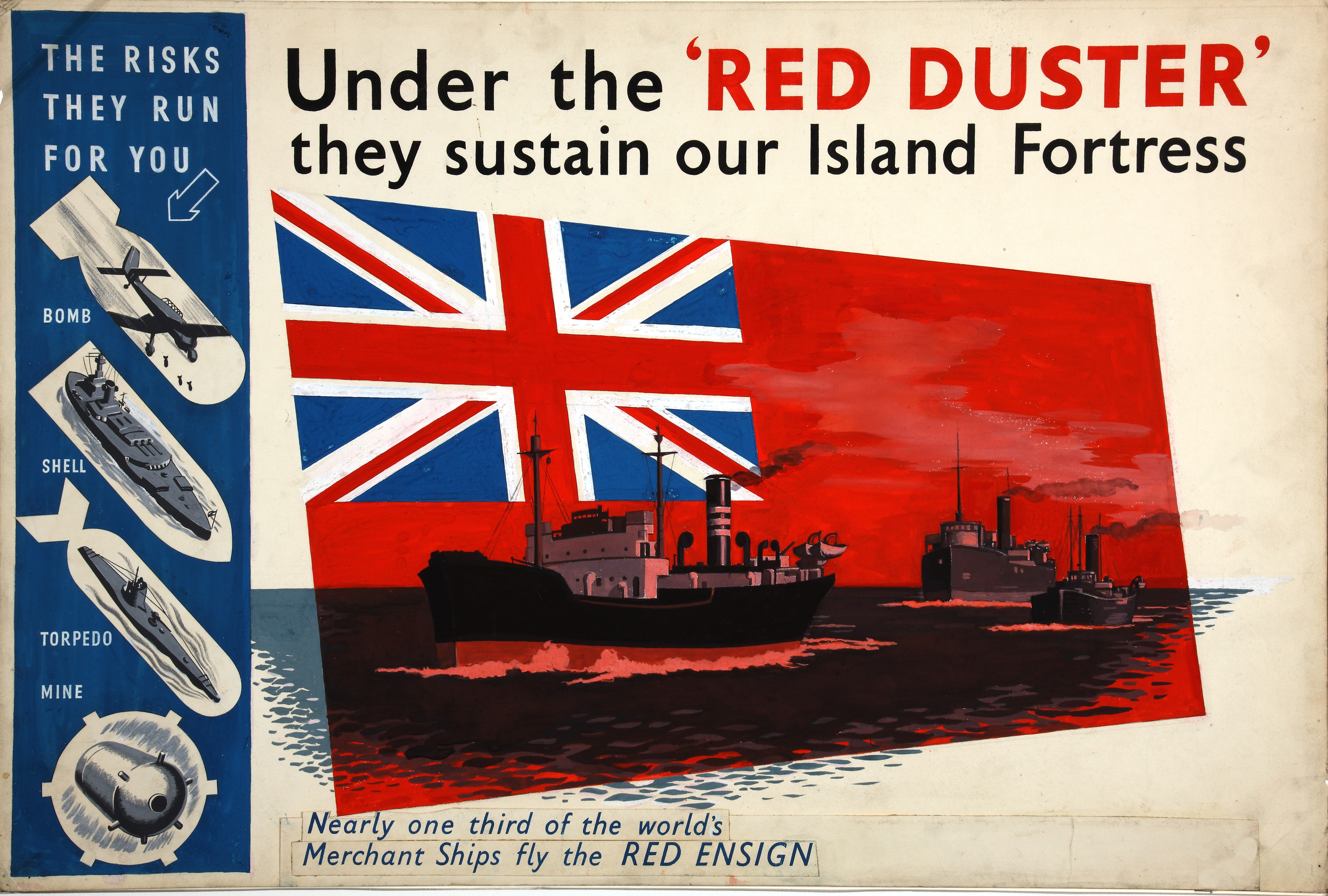
Second World War poster highlighting wartime dangers that the Merchant Navy faced

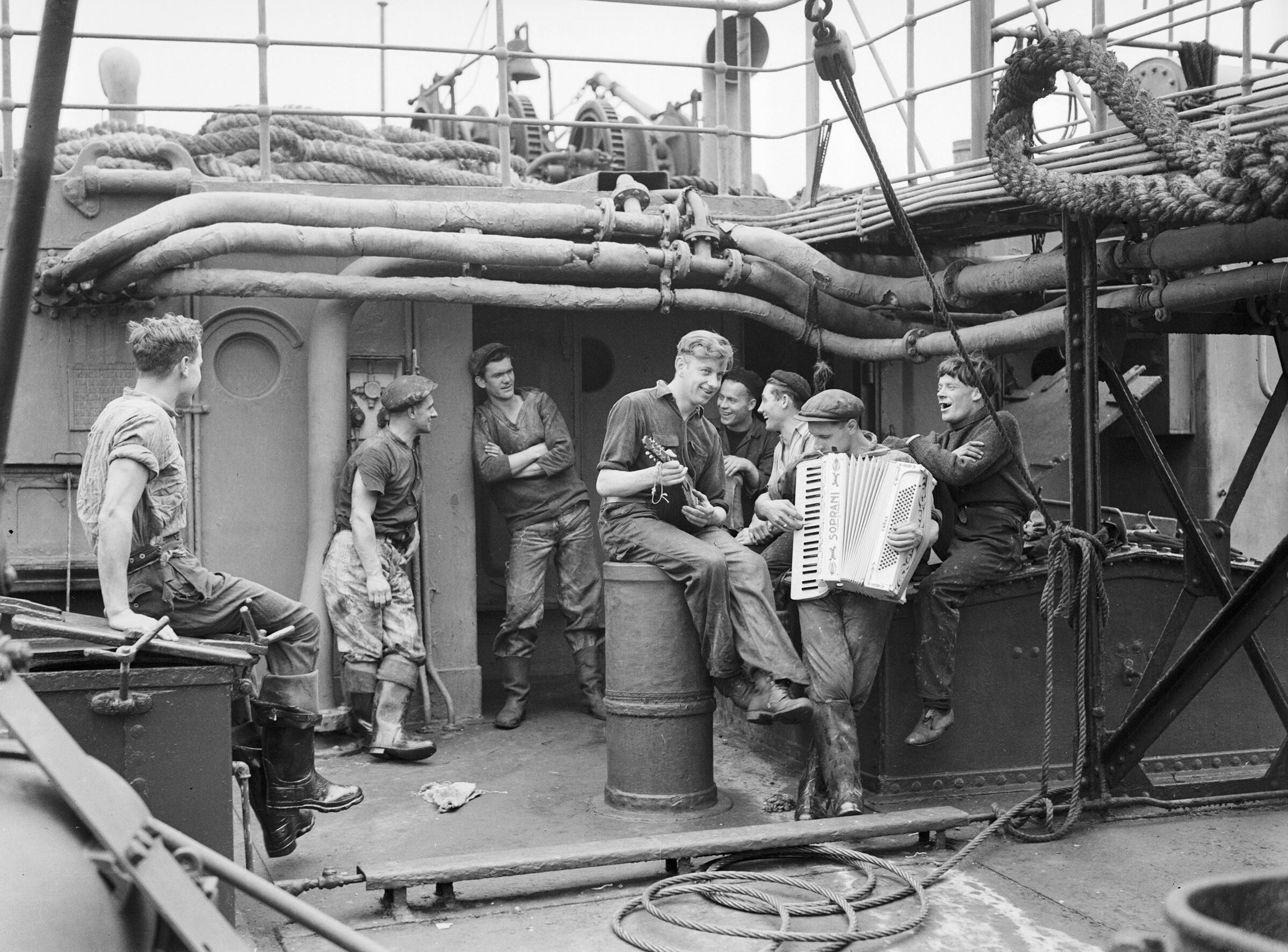
Sailors on board the merchant ship Empire Unity during World War II

In these anxious days, I would like to express to all Officers and Men and in the British Merchant Navy and the British Fishing Fleets my confidence in their unfailing determination to play their vital part in defence. To each one I would say: Yours is a task no less essential to my people's experience than that allotted to the Navy, Army and Air Force. Upon you, the Nation depends for much of its foodstuffs and raw materials and for the transport of its troops overseas. You have a long and glorious history, and I am proud to bear the title "Master of the Merchant Navy and Fishing Fleets". I know that you will carry out your duties with resolution and with fortitude, and that high chivalrous traditions of your calling are safe in your hands. God keep you and prosper you in your great task.

During the Second World War, German U-boats sank nearly 14.7 million tons of Allied shipping, which amounted to 2,828 ships (around two-thirds of the total allied tonnage lost). The United Kingdom alone suffered the loss of 11.7 million tons, which was 54% of the total Merchant Navy fleet at the outbreak of the Second World War. 32,000 merchant seafarers were killed aboard convoy vessels in the war, but along with the Royal Navy, the convoys successfully imported enough supplies to allow an Allied victory.

Between 1941 and 1949, the SR Merchant Navy class steam locomotives were built in the UK. Each locomotive of the class was named after British shipping lines from the Second World War, principally those operating out of Southampton.

In honour of the sacrifices made in both World Wars, representatives of the Merchant Navy lay wreaths of remembrance alongside the armed forces in the annual Remembrance Day service on 11 November. Following many years of lobbying to bring about official recognition of the sacrifices made by merchant seafarers in the two world wars and since, Merchant Navy Day became an official day of remembrance on 3 September 2000.

The merchant navy was also called upon to serve during the Falklands War and provided forty vessels, including transports, tankers and other vessels, with a total of 500,000 grt. The merchant ship SS Atlantic Conveyor, being used to ferry Harrier fighters and other aircraft to the South Atlantic, was lost during the conflict after being struck by an air-launched Exocet missile. The ship's captain, Ian North, and 11 other crew members died in the attack which constituted the first loss of a British merchant navy ship to an armed attack since the Second World War.

Historically a person wishing to become a captain, or master prior to about 1969, had three choices: to attend one of the three elite naval schools from the age of 12, the fixed-base HMS Conway and HMS Worcester or Pangbourne Nautical College, which would automatically lead to an apprenticeship as a seagoing cadet officer; apply to one of several training programmes elsewhere; or go to sea immediately by applying directly to a merchant shipping company at about the age of 17. There would subsequently be three years (with prior training or four years without) of seagoing experience aboard ship, in work-clothes and as mates with the deck crew, under the direction of the bo'sun cleaning bilges, chipping paint, polishing brass, cement washing freshwater tanks, and holystoning teak decks, and studying navigation and seamanship on the bridge in uniform, under the direction of an officer, before taking exams to become a second mate.

Historically, the composition of the crew on UK ships was diverse. This was a characteristic of the extant of the shipping companies trade, the extent of the British Empire and the availability of crew in different ports. One ship might have a largely all British crew, while another might have a crew composed of many Indians, Chinese or African sailors. Crews from outside Britain were usually drawn from areas in which the ship traded, so Far East trading ships had either Singapore or Hong Kong crews, banana boats had West Indian crews, ships trading to West Africa and Southern Africa had African crews and ships trading to the Indian Ocean (including East Africa) had crews from the Indian subcontinent. Crews made up of recruits from Britain itself were commonly used on ships trading across the North Atlantic, to South America and to Australia and New Zealand.

== Merchant Navy today ==
=== Fleet ===
Despite maintaining its dominant position for many decades, the decline of the British Empire, the rise of the use of the flag of convenience, and foreign competition led to the decline of the merchant fleet. For example, in 1939 the Merchant Navy was the largest in the world with 33% of total tonnage. By 2012, the Merchant Navy – while still remaining one of the largest in the world – held only 3% of total tonnage.

In 2010 the Merchant Navy consisted of 504 UK registered ships of 1,000 gross tonnage (GT) or over. In addition, UK merchant marine interests possessed a further 308 ships registered in other countries and 271 foreign-owned ships were registered in the UK.

In 2012 British merchant marine interests consisted of 1,504 ships of 100 GT or over. This included ships either directly UK-owned, parent-owned or managed by a British company. This amounted to: 59,413,000 GT or alternatively 75,265,000 DWT. This is according to the annual maritime shipping statistics provided by the British Government and the Department for Transport. In the last decade, ship numbers have continued to decline. In 2023, the British Ship Register had reduced to 1,054 ships.

=== Officers and ratings ===
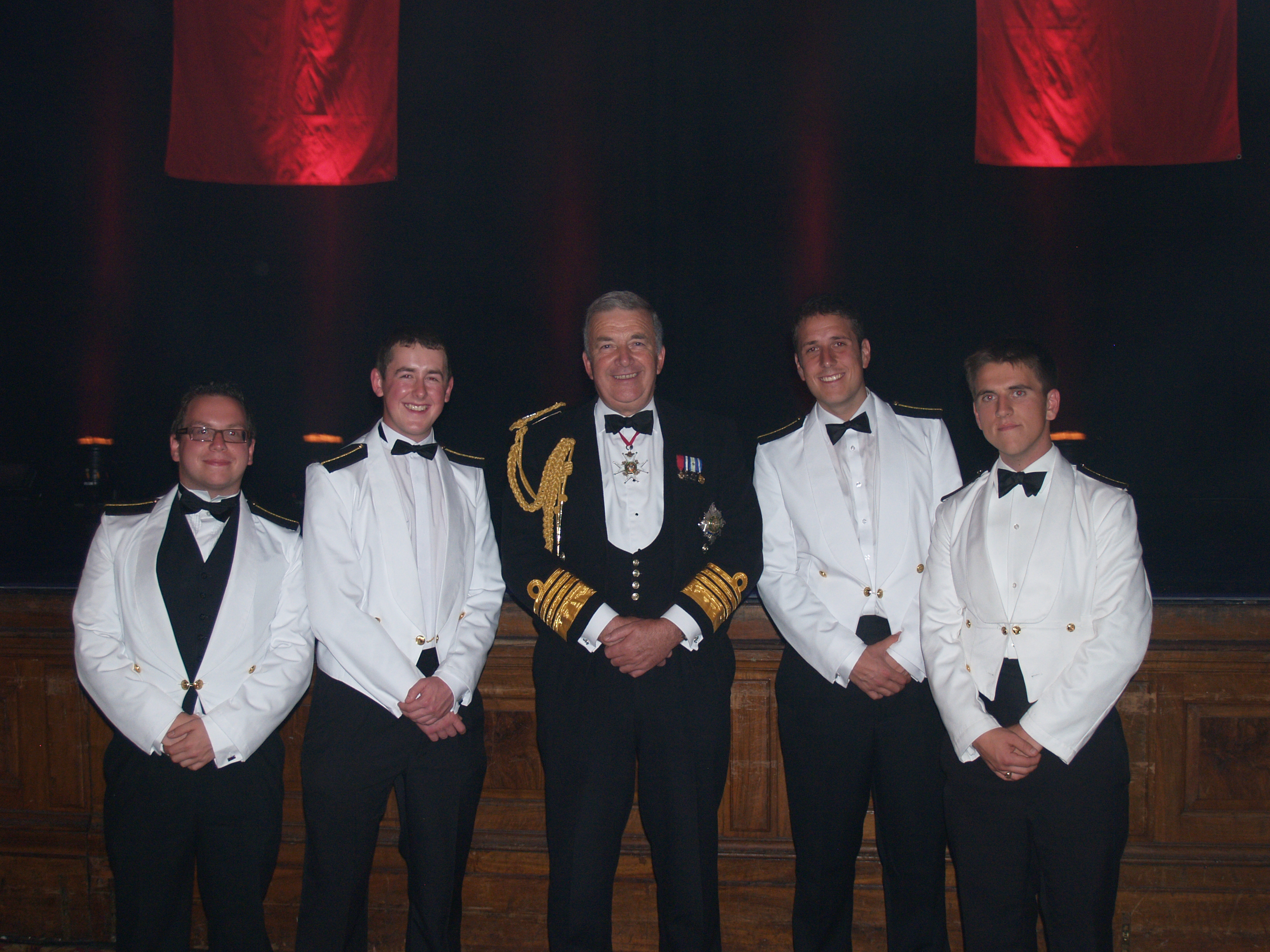
An example of Merchant Navy officers, graduating at their 'passing out' ceremony from Warsash Maritime Academy in Southampton, with former First Sea Lord Alan West, Baron West of Spithead, in 2011.

As a signatory to the STCW Convention UK ships are commanded by deck officers and engineering officers. Officers undergo three years of training, known as a cadetship at one of the approved maritime colleges in the United Kingdom. These include Warsash Maritime Academy, South Tyneside College, Fleetwood, Plymouth University and City of Glasgow College. Cadets usually have a choice of two academic routes: Foundation Degree or Higher National Diploma. Successful completion of this results in a qualification in marine operations or marine engineering. Generally the costs of a cadetship will be met by sponsorship from a UK shipping company. During the three years of training, cadets also go to sea, for a period of a year or more, usually spread across the cadetship. This affords a practical education, that along with the academic time in college prepares a candidate for a separate and final oral exam. This oral exam is carried out with a master mariner at an office of the Maritime and Coastguard Agency. Successful completion of the oral exam will result in the award of a certificate of competency. This is the international qualification, issued by the UK government which allows an officer to work in their qualified capacity on board a ship. Certificates are issued for different ranks and as such an officer will usually return to complete a subsequent series of studies until they reach the highest qualification.

The first UK deck officer certificates of competency were issued in 1845, conducted then, as now, by a final oral exam with a master mariner. The training regime for officers is set out in the official syllabus of the Merchant Navy Training Board. This training still encompasses all of the traditional trades such as celestial navigation, ship stability, general cargo and seamanship, but now includes training in business, legislation, law, and computerisation for deck officers and marine engineering principles, workshop technology, steam propulsion, motor (diesel) propulsion, auxiliaries, mechanics, thermodynamics, engineering drawing, ship construction, marine electrics as well as practical workshop training for engineering officers.

Traditionally and still now, the ships ratings are supervised by the bosun, as overseen by a responsible deck officer, usually the chief mate. A ship may also have different sub-departments, such as the galley, radio department or hospitality services, overseen by a chief cook, radio officer or chief steward. Many of these roles have now changed, as ships crews have become smaller in commercial shipping. On most ships the radio department has disappeared, along with the radio officer (colloquially known as 'sparks') replaced by changes in technology and the requirement under the STCW Convention for deck officers to hold individual certification in the GMDSS system. Electro-technical officers (ETO) also serve aboard some ships and are trained to fix and maintain the more complex systems.

In 2023, the UK Merchant Navy had 10,930 certificated officers, 10,180 ratings, 1,450 merchant navy cadets and 1,540 other officers.

=== Charities ===
Merchant navy related charities are active in the UK. The Merchant Navy Welfare Board administers the MN fund for charitable support. Other charities include the Shipwrecked' Mariners Society, the Seafarer's Charity, the Scottish Nautical Welfare Society and the Scottish Shipping Benevolent Association.

== Flags ==
=== Ensigns ===
Ensigns are displayed at the stern of the vessel or displayed on the gaff, on a yardarm. Red Ensigns can be defaced, those can only be flown with a warrant on board the vessel. Bermuda (historically part of British North America, but left out of the Confederation of Canada) flies the red ensign also as a territorial flag on land, as did other British North American colonies that still do so as Provinces of modern Canada, including Ontario (other British Overseas Territories that fly a nautical ensign as the territorial flag on land use the Blue Ensign which in Bermuda is only flown from civil government vessels such as ferry boats).

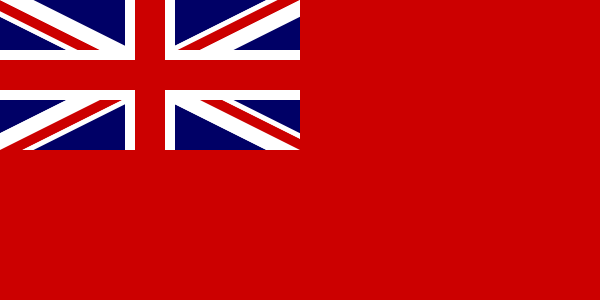
Merchant Navy

==== British Overseas Territories and Crown Dependencies ensigns ====
Bermuda

British Virgin Islands

Cayman Islands

Falkland Islands

Gibraltar

Guernsey

Isle of Man

Jersey

Turks and Caicos Islands

==== Yacht club ensigns ====
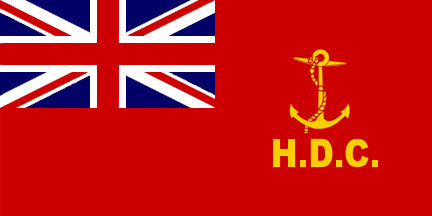
Hamilton Dinghy Club

House of Commons Yacht Club

Royal Dart Yacht Club

Royal Fowey Yacht Club

Royal Hamilton Amateur Dinghy Club

Royal Norfolk and Suffolk Yacht Club

Royal Portsmouth Corinthian Yacht Club and the Royal St George Yacht Club

Royal Victoria Yacht Club

Royal Windermere Yacht Club

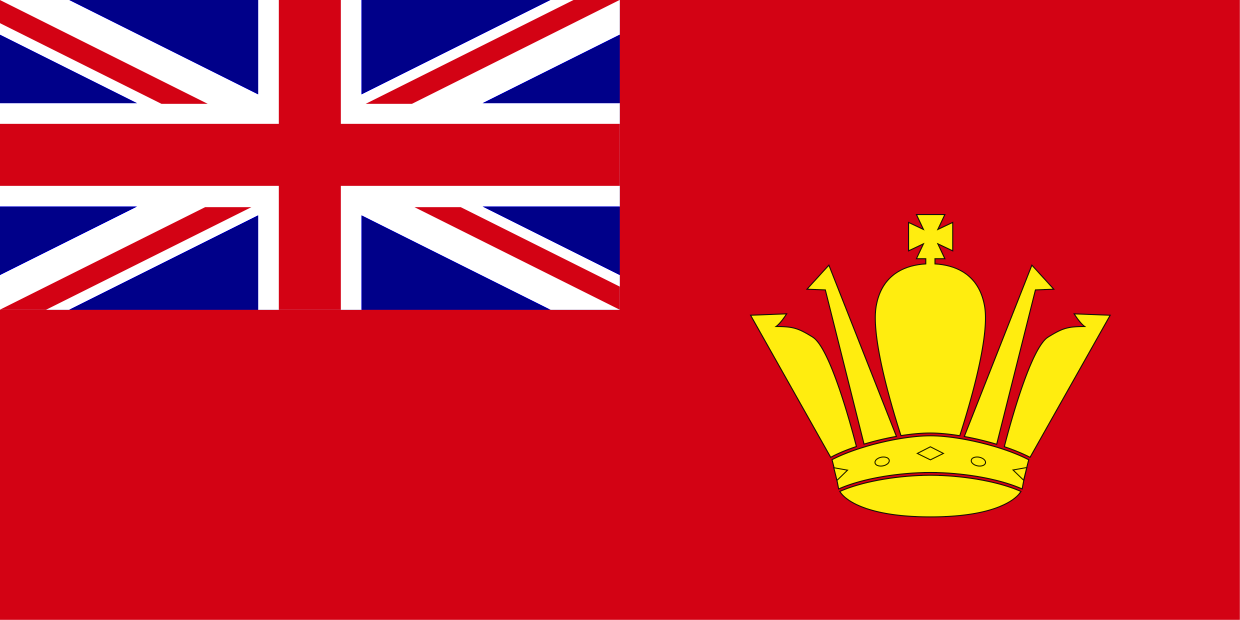
Royal Yachting Association

St Helier Yacht Club

West Mersea Yacht Club

==== Institution ensigns ====
Trinity House

Royal National Lifeboat Institution

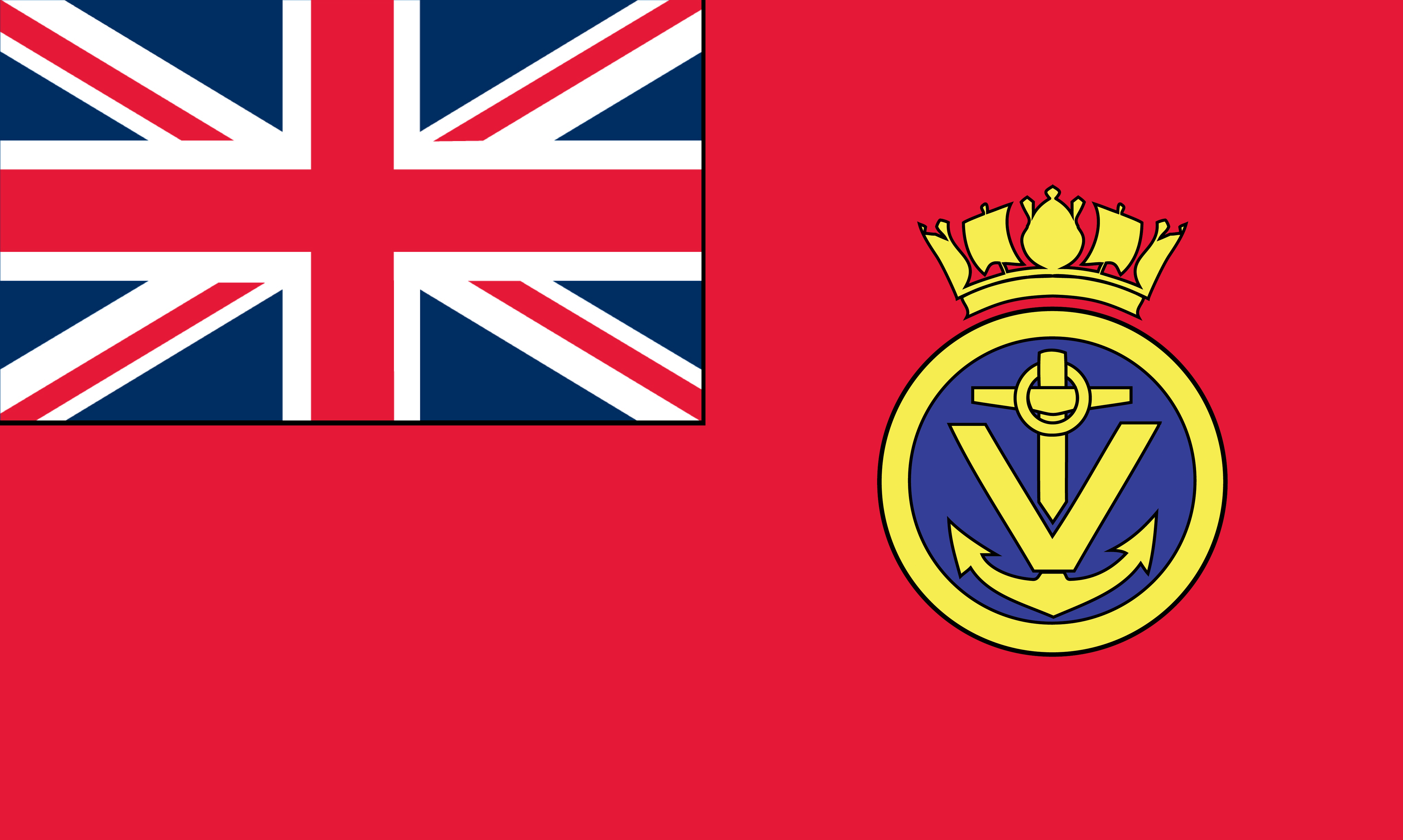
Maritime Volunteer Service

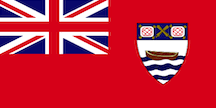
Company of Watermen and Lightermen

Ship of the National Historic Fleet

Registered vessel of the National Historic Fleet

=== House flags ===
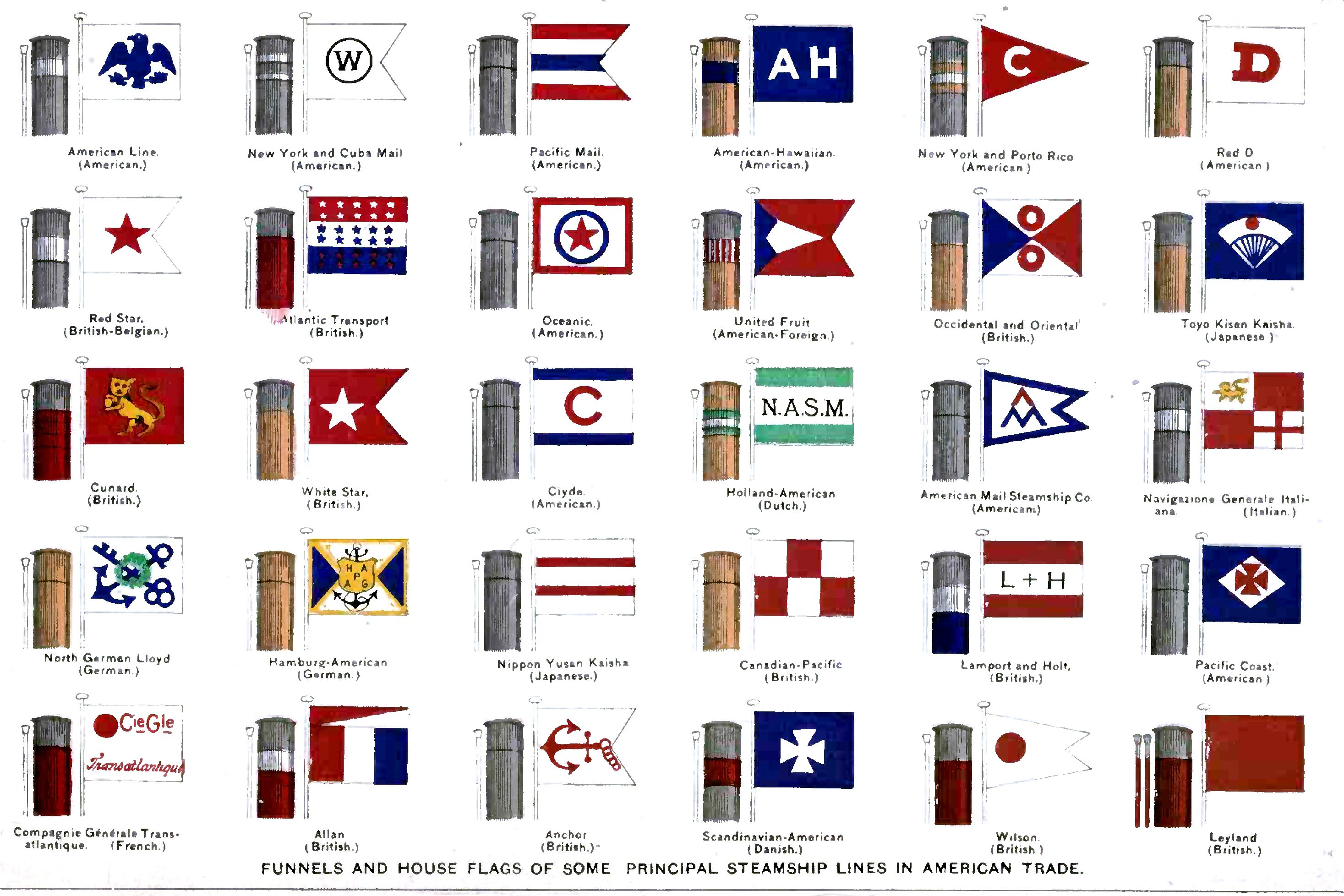
House flags of the early 20th century

House flags are personal and designed by a company. A house flag is displayed on a port halyard of a Yardarm.

== Notable people ==
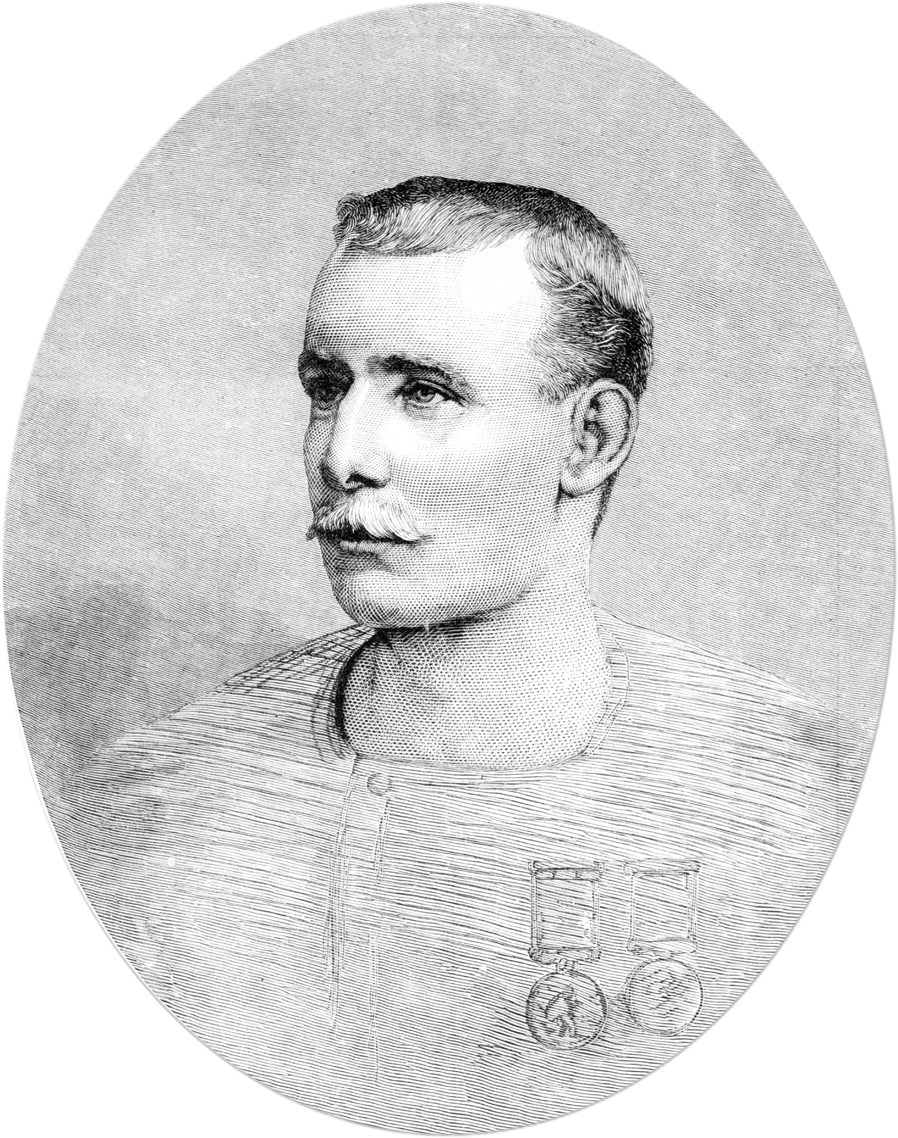
Captain Matthew Webb, a Captain and cross channel swimmer.

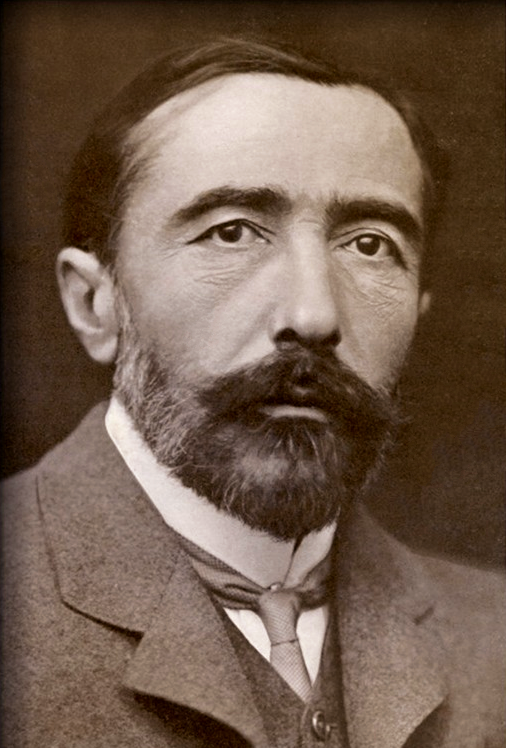
Joseph Conrad, a Captain and author.

A number of notable Merchant Navy personnel include:

- Fred Blackburn: England footballer.
- Chris Braithwaite (c. 1885–1944): seafarers' organiser and Pan-Africanist.
- Joseph Conrad: joined the Merchant Navy in 1874, rising through the ranks of Second Mate and First Mate, to Master in 1886. Left in order to write professionally, becoming one of the 20th century's greatest novelists.
- James Cook (1728–1779), FRS, Royal Navy officer, explorer, cartographer
- Lionel 'Buster' Crabb: Naval frogman, cadet at HMS Conway 1923–1925.
- Victoria Drummond: MBE, (1894–1978) Britain's first woman ship's engineer.
- Ian Duncan-Smith Politician. Cadet at HMS Conway 1968–1972.
- Gerry Fitt: founder of the Social Democratic and Labour Party in Northern Ireland
- Air Marshal Sir Peter Horsley: Deputy Commander in Chief of RAF Strike Command 1973–1975. He started work as a deck boy in 1939 aboard TSS Cyclops.
- Charles Howard GC FRS FRSE (1906–1941), Earl of Suffolk and of Berkshire. Apprentice officer on the windjammer Mount Stewart; bomb disposal expert in World War II.
- Gareth Hunt: actor, notably in The New Avengers, and Upstairs, Downstairs
- Violet Jessop: stewardess who survived the Titanic sinking, and author of autobiography about sailing.
- Frank Laskier: WWII Merchant Navy steward who became a public icon for recruitment efforts.
- Freddie Lennon: Merchant Navy steward whose son John later founded the musical group the Beatles.
- Kevin McClory: Irishman who spent 14 days in a lifeboat and later went on to write the James Bond movies Never Say Never Again and Thunderball.
- John Masefield: served in Merchant Navy in 1890s: Cadet at HMS Conway 1891–1894. later Poet Laureate.
- Henry Nelson, 7th Earl Nelson
- Peter de Neumann: GM. "The Man From Timbuctoo", The "de Neumann Way" named for him.
- Alun Owen: later wrote the screenplay for A Hard Day's Night.
- Frederick Daniel Parslow: VC. Merchant Navy recipient of the Victoria Cross.
- Arthur Phillip: joined the Merchant Navy in 1751 and 37 years later founded the city of Sydney, Australia as the First Governor of New South Wales, which then included the eastern half of the Australia we know today, plus New Zealand.
- John Prescott: Merchant Navy steward who became Deputy Prime Minister in 1997 under Tony Blair.
- Ken Russell: directed films such as Tommy, Altered States, and The Lair of the White Worm.
- Archibald Bisset Smith: VC. Merchant Navy Victoria Cross recipient.
- Tommy Steele: Merchant Navy steward who went on to become an early British rock and roll singer.
- Captain Matthew Webb: (19 January 1848 – 24 July 1883) Cadet at HMS Conway 1860–1862 was the first recorded person to swim the English Channel without the use of artificial aids.

== Medals and awards ==
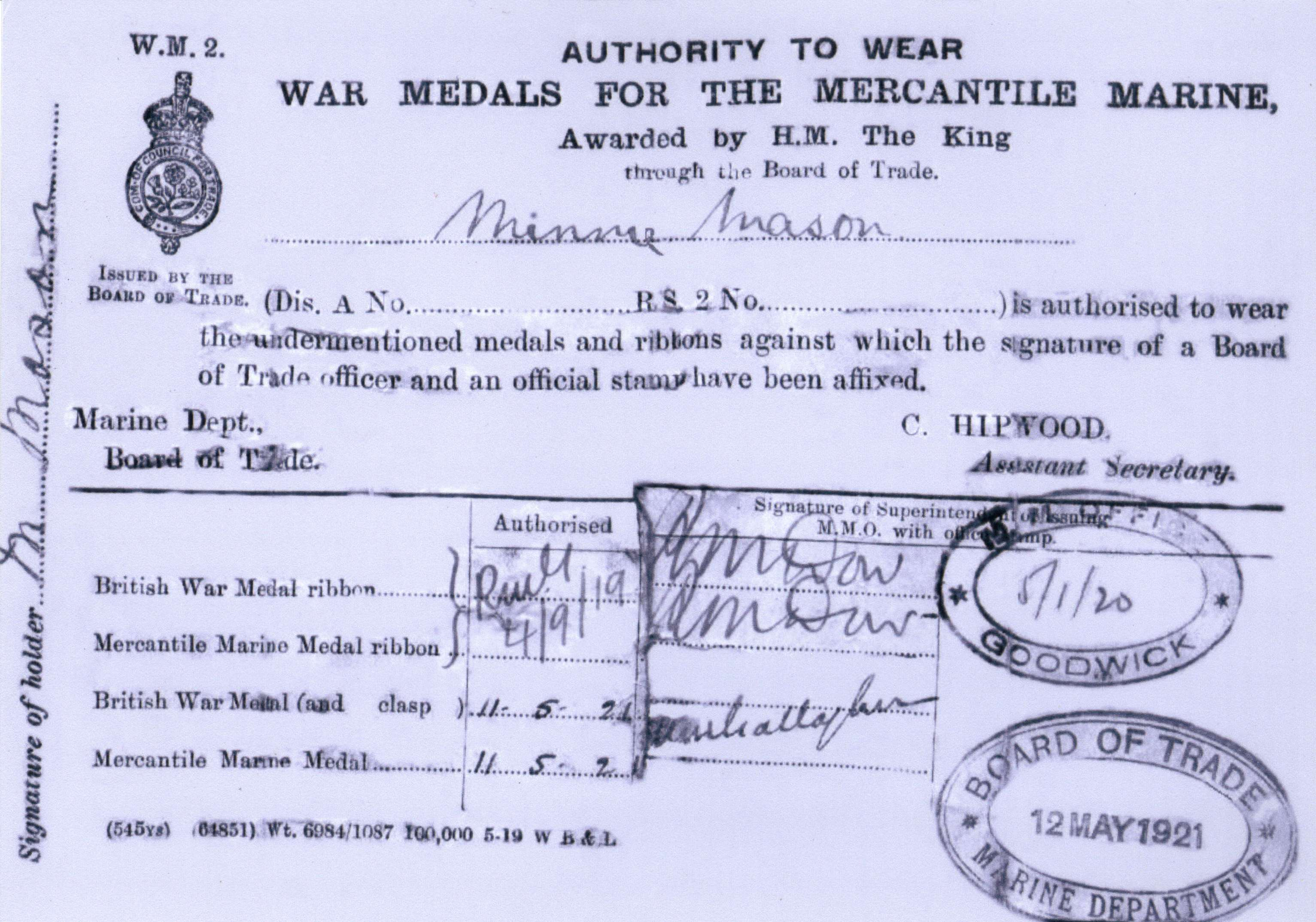
Authority to wear the British War Medal (and ribbon) and the Mercantile Marine Medal (and clasp, ribbon) issued to Minnie Mason for her work on English Channel ferries throughout World War I

Members of the UK Merchant Navy have been awarded the Victoria Cross, George Cross, George Medal, Distinguished Service Order, and Distinguished Service Cross for their actions while serving in the Merchant Navy. The Canadian, Philip Bent, ex-British Merchant Navy, joined the British Army at the outbreak of World War I and won the Victoria Cross. Members of the Merchant Navy who served in either world war also received relevant campaign medals.

In the Second World War many Merchant Navy members received the King's Commendation for Brave Conduct. Lloyd's of London awarded the Lloyd's War Medal for Bravery at Sea to 541 Merchant Navy personnel for their bravery in 1939–1945. Many Royal Humane Society medals and awards have been conferred on Merchant Navy seafarers for acts of humanity in both war and peacetime.

In September 2016 the UK Government introduced the Merchant Navy Medal for Meritorious Service. The medal is awarded:

"to those who are serving or have served in the Merchant Navy and fishing fleets of the UK, Isle of Man or Channel Islands for exemplary service and devotion to duty, rewarding those who have set an outstanding example to others."

It is the first state award for meritorious service in the history of the Merchant Navy. Recipients must be nominated by someone other than themselves, with at least two written letters of support and are normally required to have completed 20 years service in the Merchant Navy (although in exceptional circumstances it may be less).

== Ranks ==
The insignia used today by the UK Merchant Navy varies from one company to the next. Below are examples of the most common insignia worn

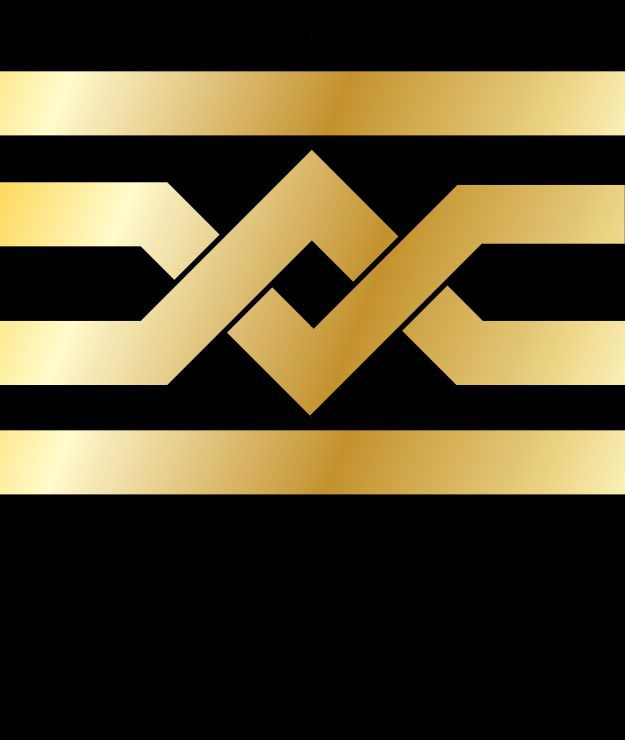
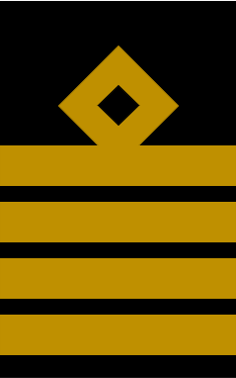
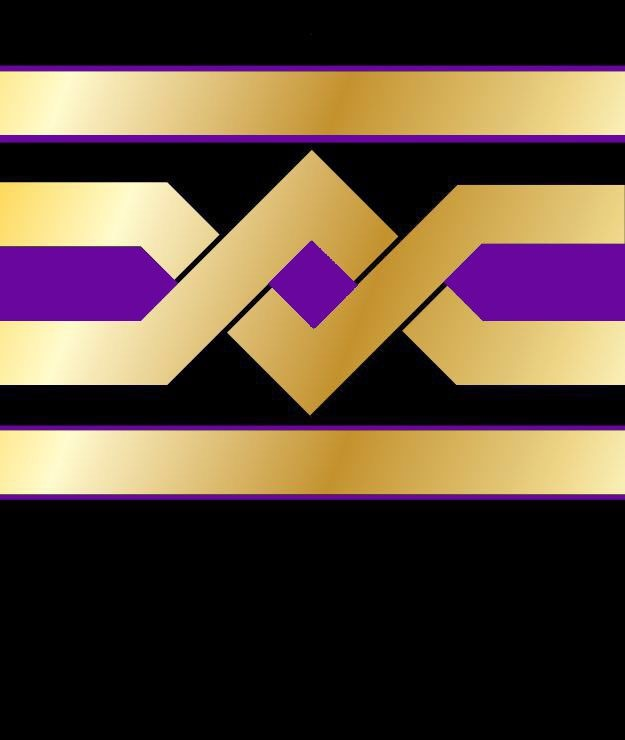
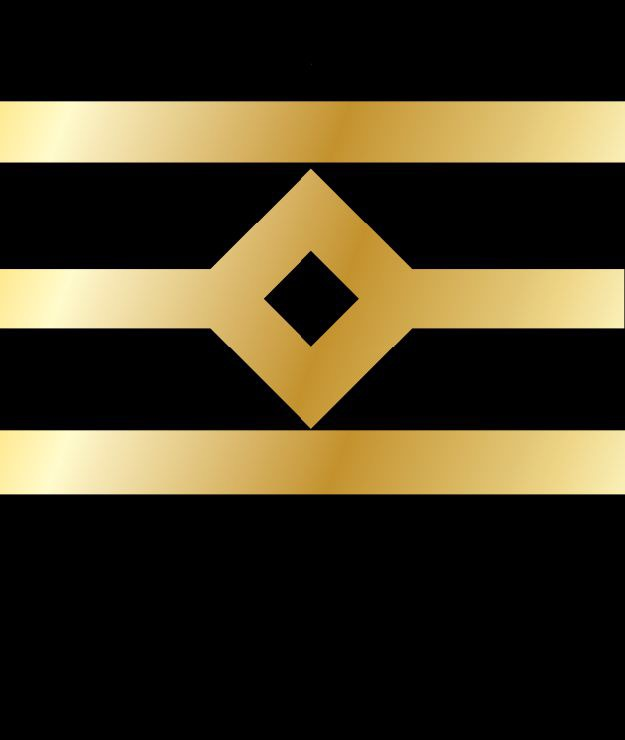
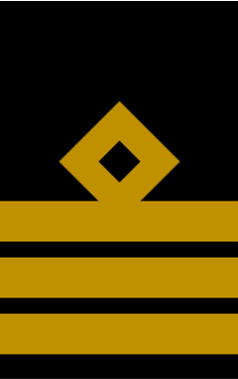
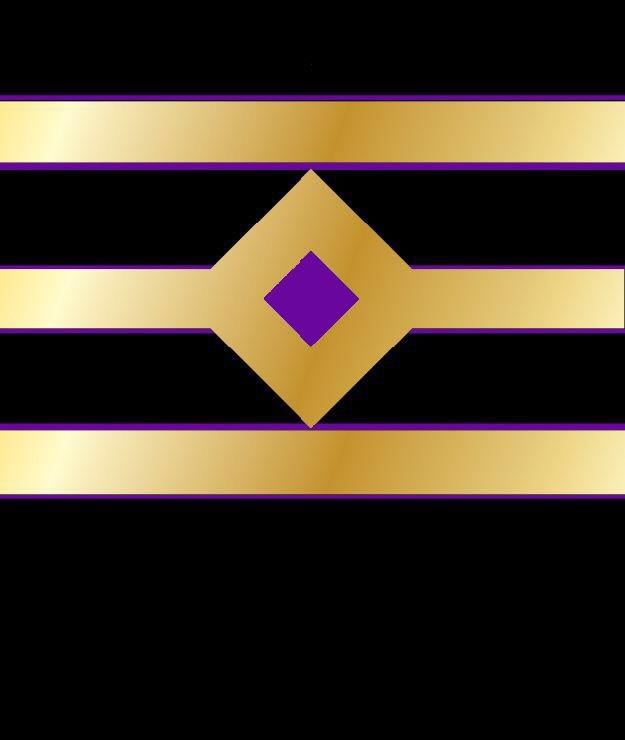
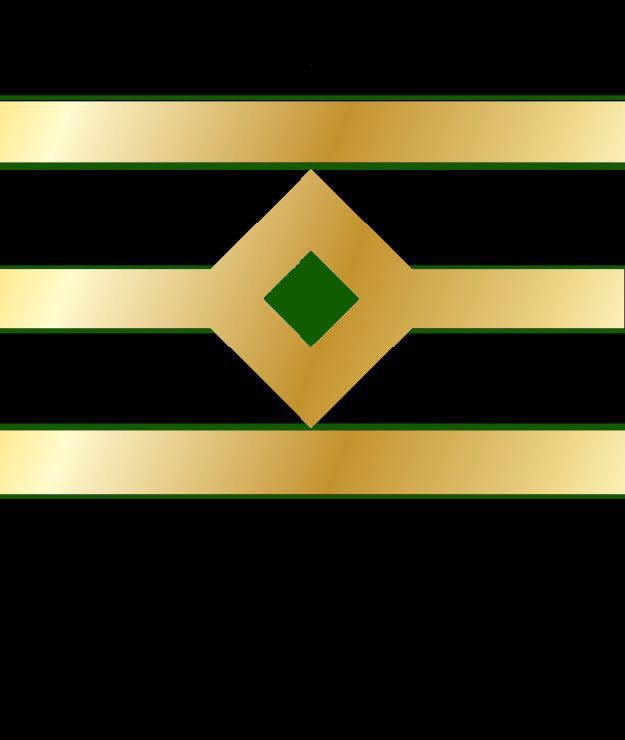
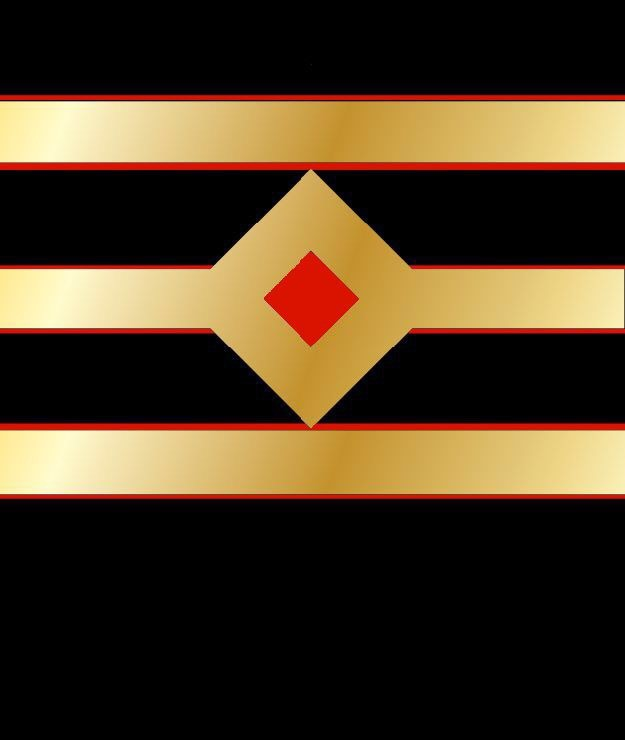
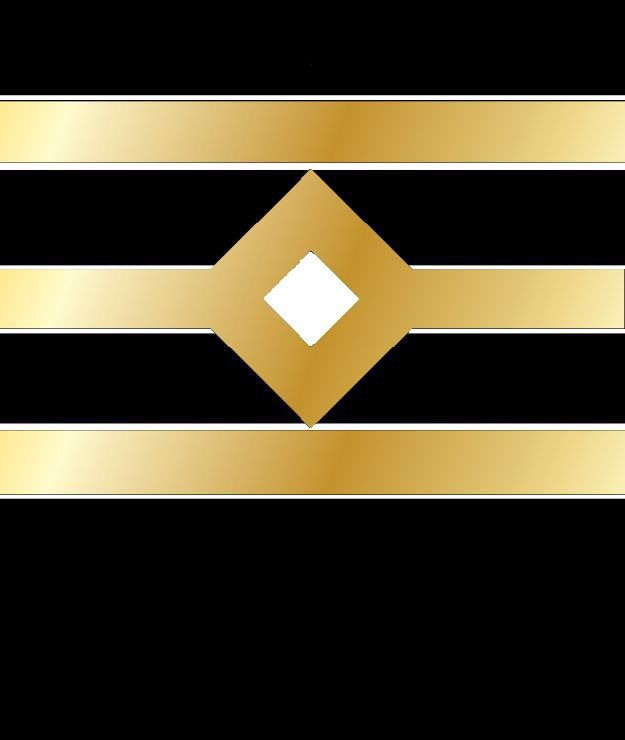
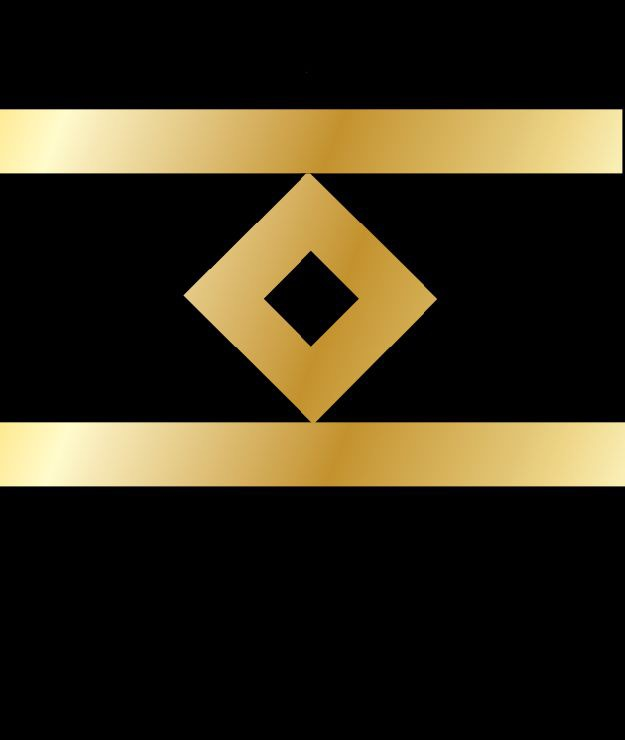
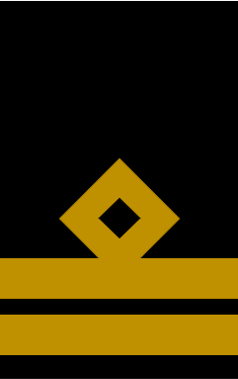
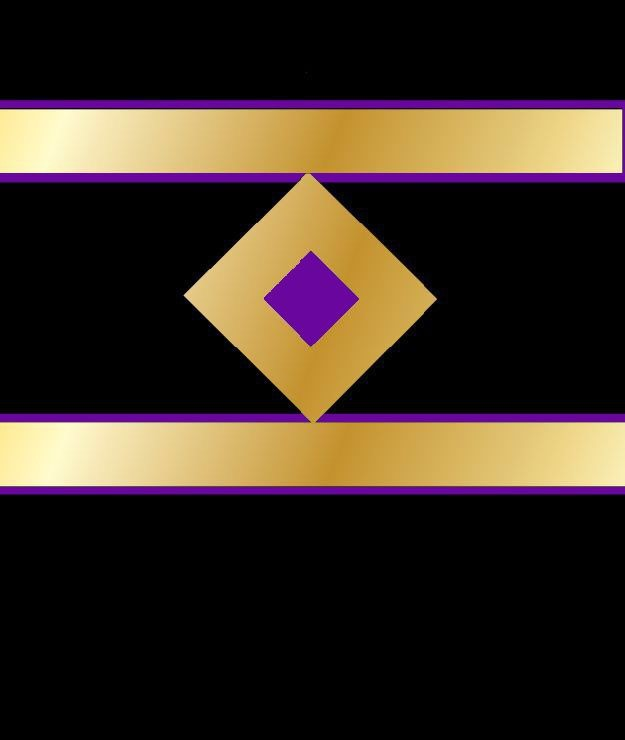
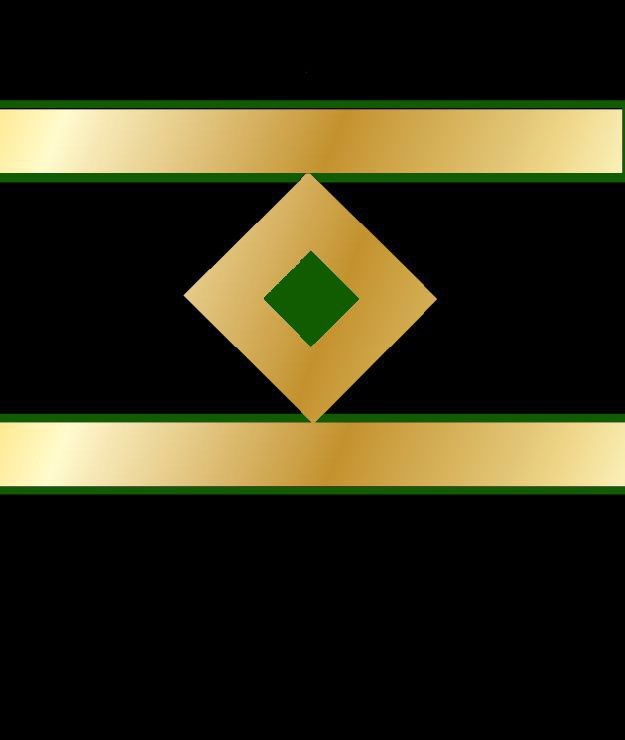
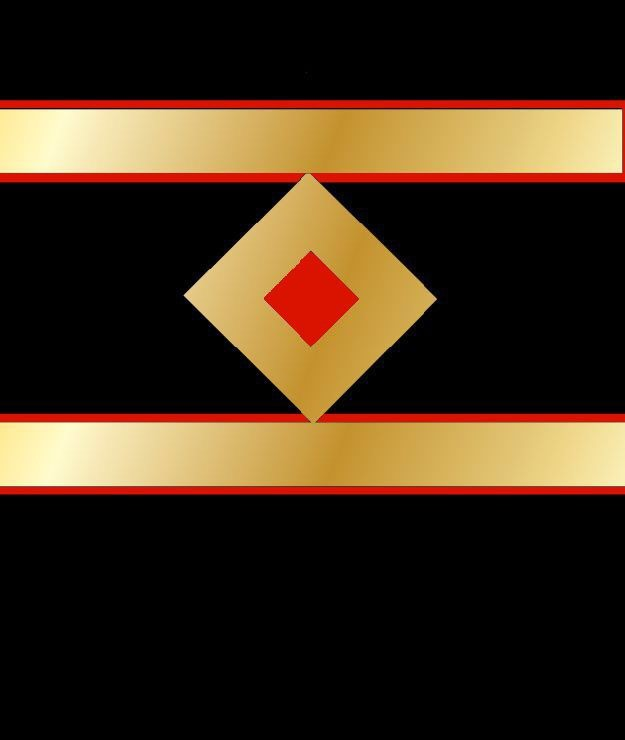
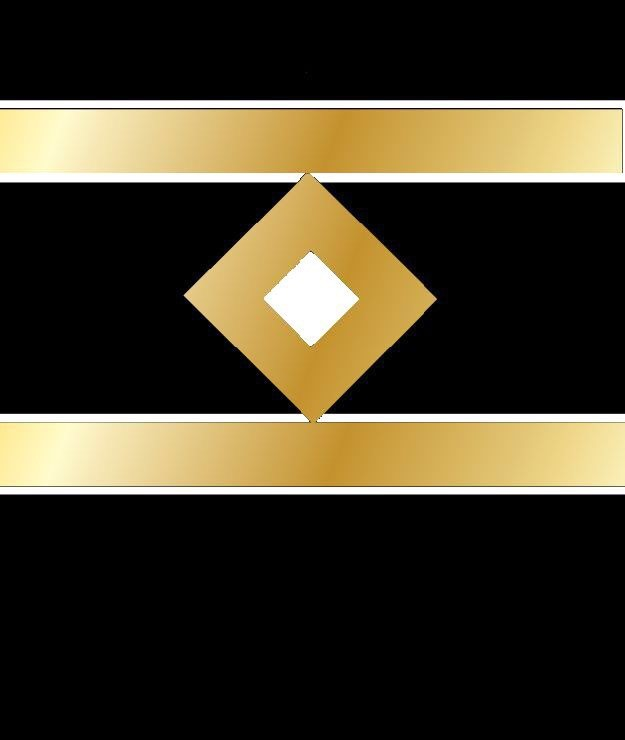
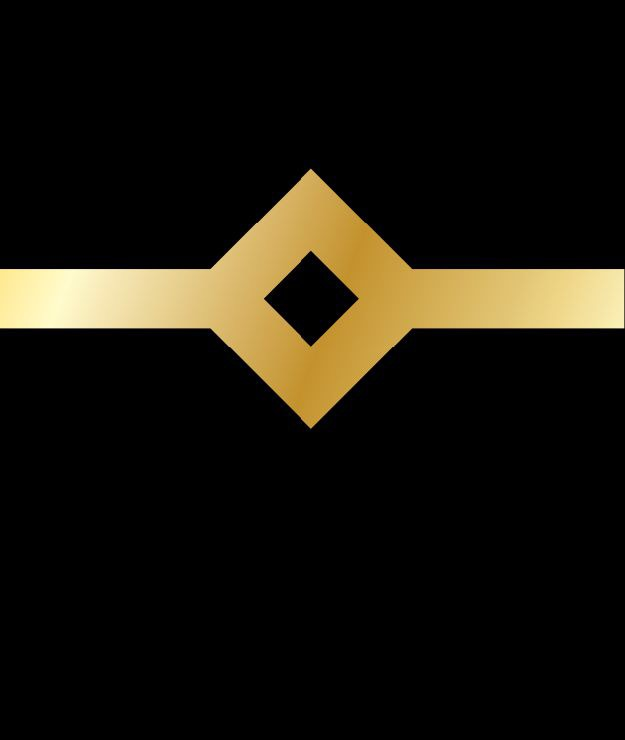
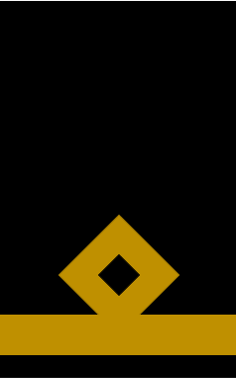
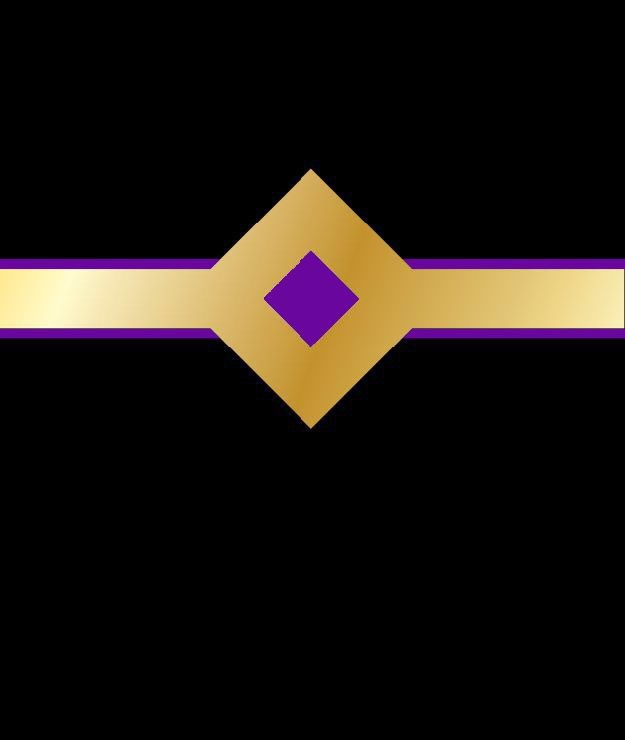
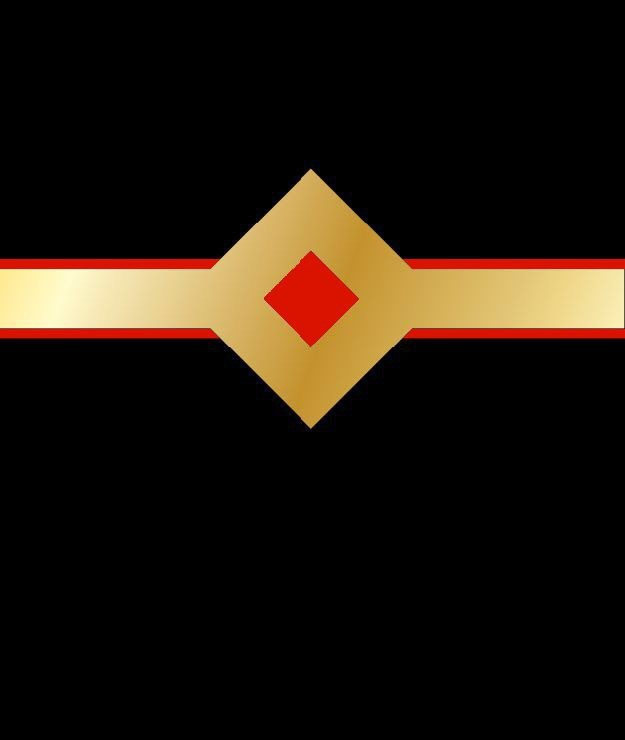
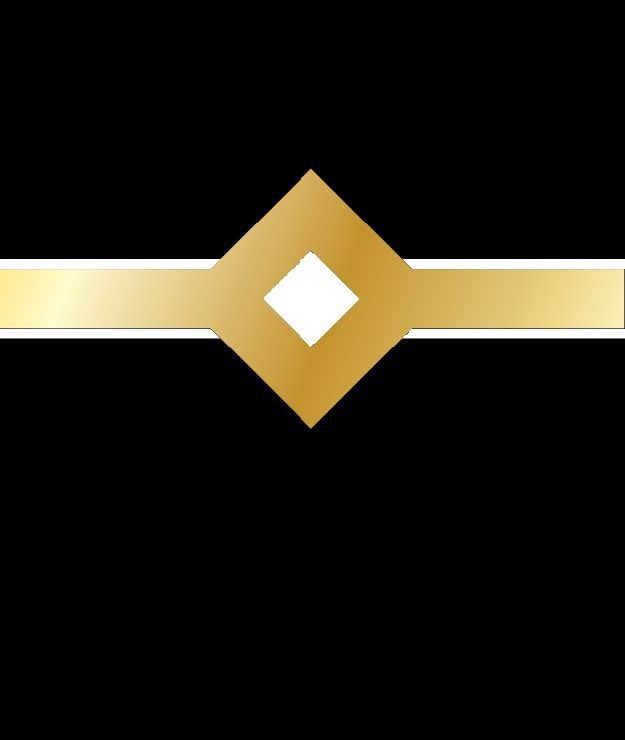
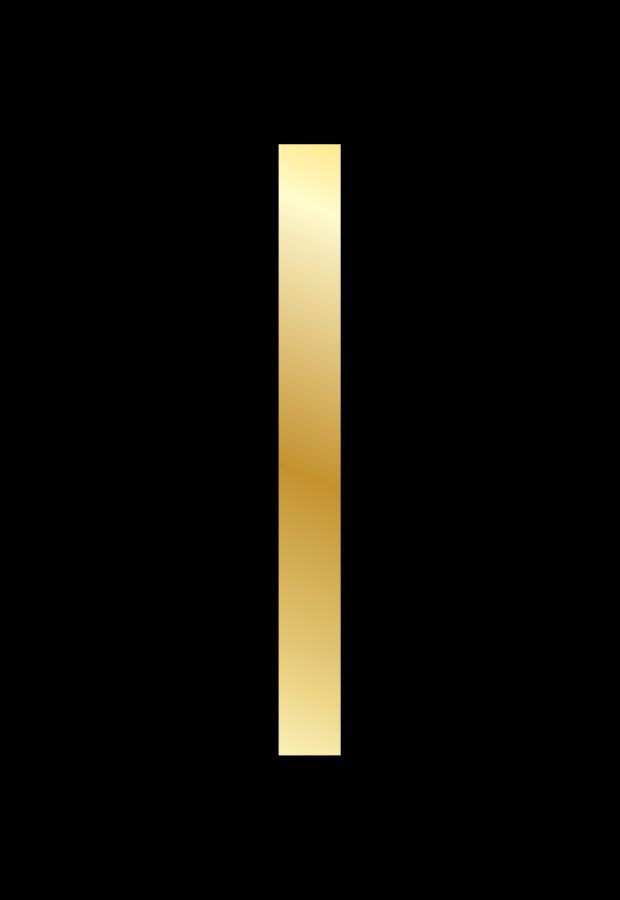
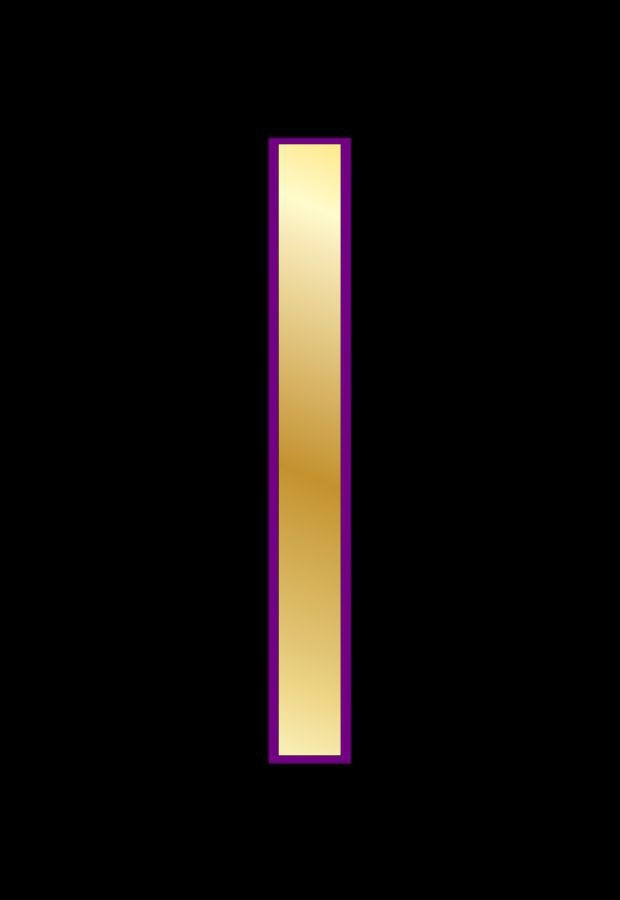
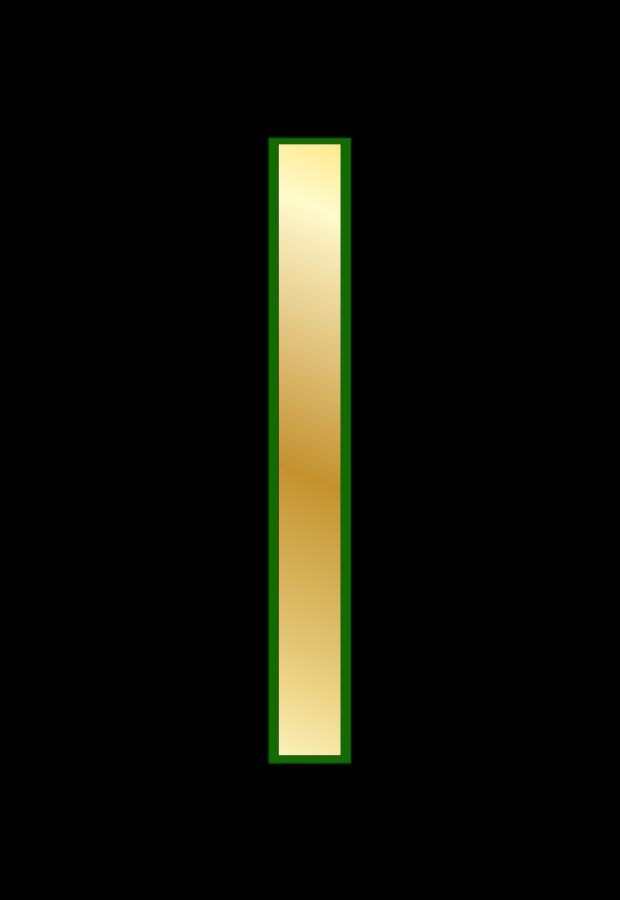
| Deck Officers | Engineer Officer | Electrical Technical Officer | Ship's Medical Officer | Steward's Department Officer |
|---|---|---|---|---|
| Master MCA EH-05 | Chief Engineer | N/A | N/A | N/A |
| Chief Officer MCA EH-04 | Second Engineer | Chief ETO | Ship's Surgeon | Chief Purser |
| Second Officer MCA EH-02 | Third Engineer | ETO | Ship's Doctor or Dentist | Purser |
| Third Officer MCA EH-01 | Fourth Engineer | N/A | Ship's Nurse | Assistant Purser |
| Cadet Deck Officer | Cadet Engineer Officer | Cadet Electrical Officer | N/A | N/A |

The City of Glasgow College's Riverside Campus is the UK's largest training centre for Merchant Navy officer cadets, with the 3 years of training split into 5 phases - Phases 1, 3 and 5 at the college campus and Phases 2 and 4 at sea, often with a sponsor company. Uniquely, the college issues epaulettes to its Officer Cadets indicating what phase of college training they are on, with Phase 1 using the standard Cadet Deck Officer insignia for their department, Phase 3 cadets wearing two gold bands and Phase 5 cadets wearing three gold bands. The College also offers a number of pre-Cadetship courses, with those cadets wearing a black epaulette with an anchor towards the top of the shoulder.

City of Glasgow College - Riverside Campus Ranks
| | Deck Cadets | Engineering Cadets | ETO Cadets | Pre-Cadetship |
|---|---|---|---|---|
| Phase 1 | | | | |
| Phase 3 | | | | N/A |
| Phase 5 | | | | N/A |

== British shipping companies ==
The British Merchant Navy consists of private shipping companies. Over the decades many companies have come and gone, merged, changed their name or changed owners. British Shipping is represented nationally and globally by the UK Chamber of Shipping, headquartered in London. British shipping registrars belong to the Red Ensign Group.

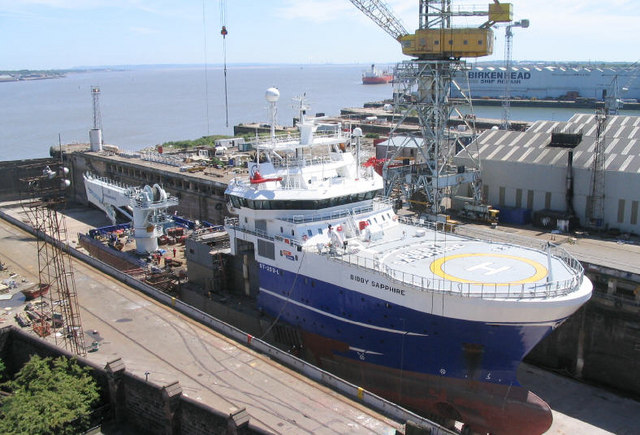
The Bibby Sapphire is a diving support vessel built in 2005 for the operational shipping company Bibby Line.

The British Emperor, launched in 1916 was a ship of the British Tanker Company that was sunk in 1941.

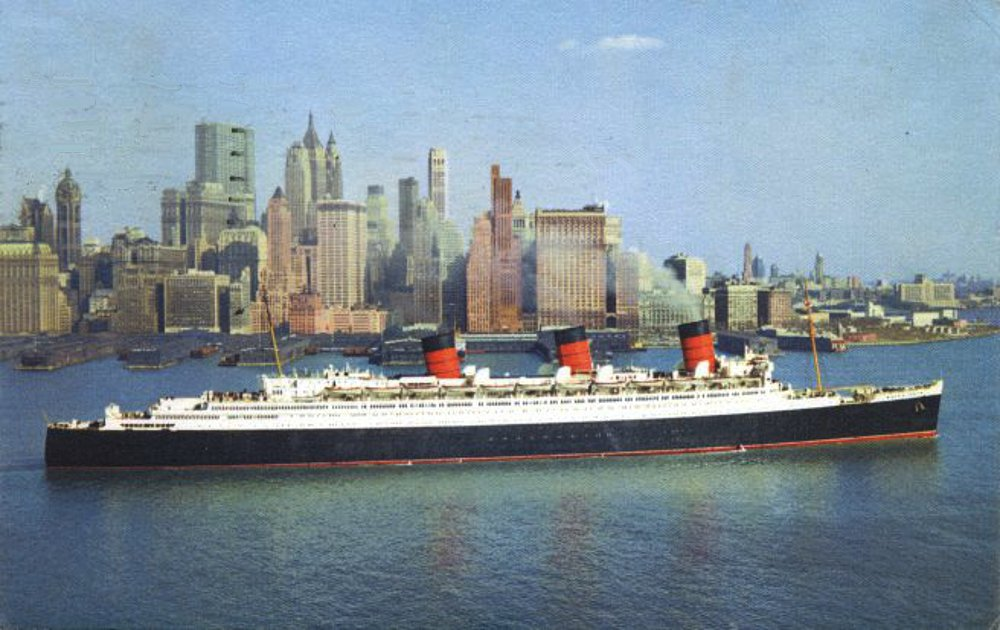
Queen Mary of 1936 (80,700 GRT) was a ship of the Cunard Line.

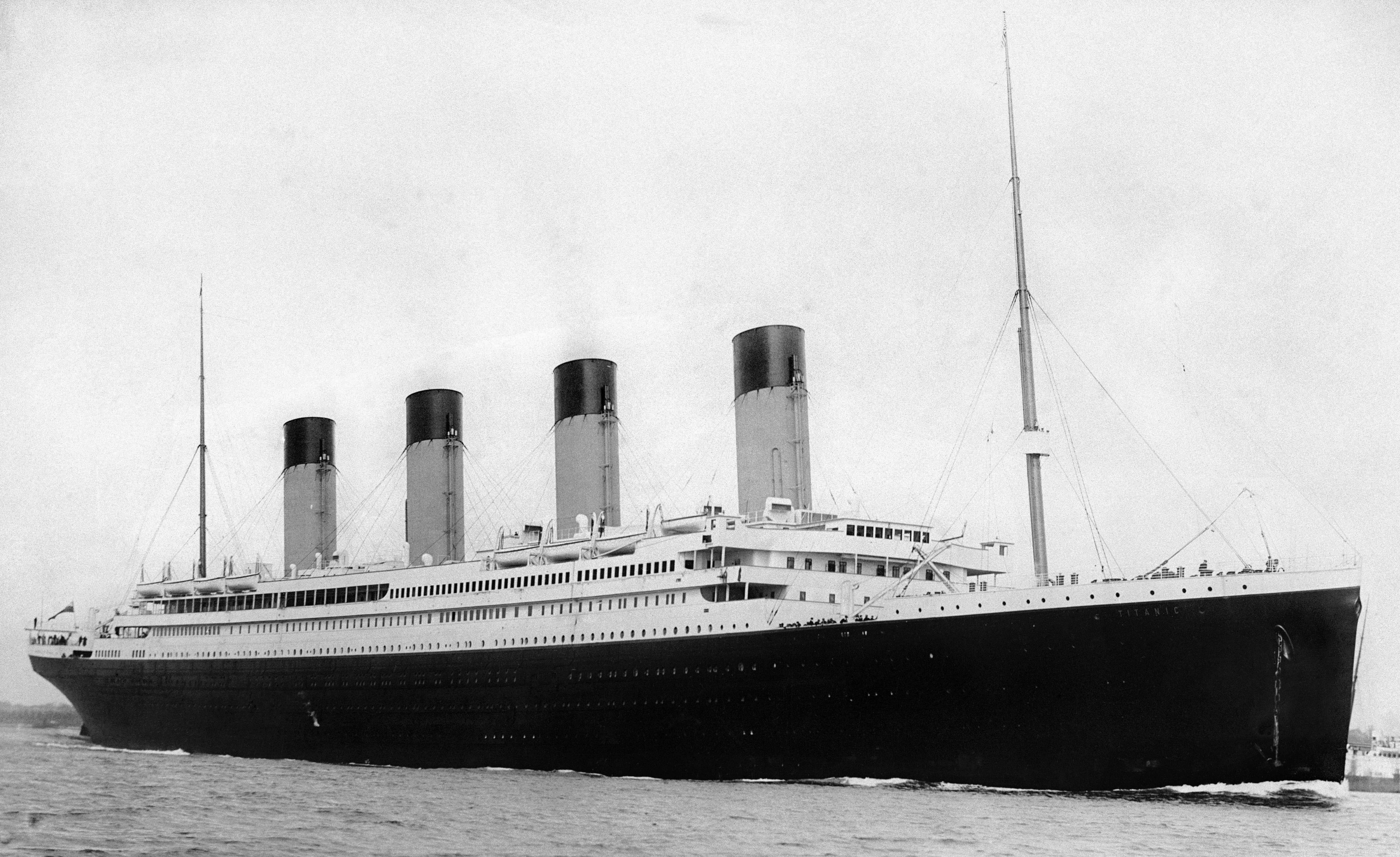
Titanic, a White Star Line ship, departing Southampton on her ill-fated maiden voyage.

Below is a list of some of the British shipping companies, past and present:

- Aberdeen Line
- Alexander Shipping Co.
- American and Indian Line; Bucknall Steamship Lines
- Anchor-Donaldson
- Anchor Line
- Australind Steam Navigation Company
- Anglo-Saxon Petroleum Company (Shell Tankers), now Royal Dutch Shell
- Atlantic Steam Navigation Company
- Bank Line
- Ben Line
- Bibby Line
- Blue Anchor Line
- Blue Funnel Line (Alfred Holt)
- Blue Star Line
- Booth Steamship Company
- Bolton Steam Shipping Co. Ltd.
- Bowker and King
- British and African Steam Navigation Company
- British and Burmese Steam Navigation Company
- British India Steam Navigation Company
- BP
- British Tanker Company
- Thos & Jno Brocklebank Ltd
- Bullard, King and Company, including Natal Direct Line
- Burns and Laird Lines
- Byron Marine Ltd
- Cairns, Noble and Company
- Caledonian MacBrayne, formerly Caledonian Steam Packet Company and David MacBrayne
- Carisbrooke Shipping
- P & A Campbell
- The China Navigation Company
- Clan Line
- Clyde Shipping Company
- Coast Lines
- William Cory and Son
- Counties Ship Management
- Crescent Shipping
- Cunard Line
- Currie Line – Leith
- Denholm Line Steamers
- Donaldson Line
- Donaldson Atlantic Line
- Dundee, Perth and London Shipping Company
- Eagle Oil and Shipping Company
- Elder Dempster Lines, including Glen Line and Shire Line
- Ellerman Lines, including many companies taken over
- Evan Thomas Radcliffe
- F T Everard & Sons Ltd
- Federal Steam Navigation Company
- Fisher, Renwick Manchester – London Steamers
- Fletcher Shipping Ltd.
- Furness Withy
- Fyffes Line
- GATX-Oswego Steam Navigation Company
- General Steam Navigation Company
- Global Marine Systems, previously Cable & Wireless Marine and British Telecom Marine
- Harrison Line (T&J Harrison)
- Harrison Clyde Ltd Woodside Crescent Glasgow
- Head Line Ulster Steamship Co. Ltd. – Belfast
- P Henderson and Company
- JP Henry and MacGregor – Leith
- Houlder Brothers and Company (Houlder Line)
- RP Houston and Company (Houston Line)
- Indo-China Steam Navigation Company Ltd.
- Isle of Man Steam Packet Company
- Isles of Scilly Steamship Company
- Lamport and Holt
- Leyland Line
- London & Overseas Freighters
- Loch Line
- Manchester Liners
- Mississippi and Dominion Steamship Company (Dominion Line)
- North of Scotland and Orkney and Shetland Steam Navigation Company
- North Star Shipping
- Oceanic Steam Navigation Company (White Star Line)
- Orient Steam Navigation Company (Anderson, Green and Company)
- Palm Line
- Pacific Steam Navigation Company
- Peninsular and Oriental Steam Navigation Company (P&O)
- Port Line, formerly the Commonwealth and Dominion Line
- Prince Line
- Reardon Smith
- Red Funnel Line
- Ropner Shipping Company
- Royal Mail Steam Packet Company
- Scottish Ship Management
- Scottish Shire Line
- Sealink (and its predecessors the Great Western Railway, LMS, LNER and Southern Railway, and many of their antecedents)
- Shaw, Savill & Albion Line
- Shell International Shipping Services
- Silver Line
- Stag Line
- Star Line
- Stephenson Clarke Shipping
- Townsend Brothers Ferries, later Townsend Thoresen
- Tyne-Tees Steam Shipping Company
- Union-Castle Line
- United Africa Company
- United Baltic Corporation
- Wandsworth and District Gas Company
- Andrew Weir and Company
- Wightlink
- White Star Line
- Wilson Line
- Yeoward Line

== See also ==
- Equivalent Royal Navy ranks in the Merchant Navy
- His Majesty's Coastguard
- List of merchant navy capacity by country
- Ratings in the Merchant Navy (United Kingdom)
- Royal Naval Reserve
- Transport in the United Kingdom
- United States Merchant Marine
- Maritime Militia (China)
- Witherby Publishing Group

== Bibliography ==
- Blackmore, Edward (1897). The British Mercantile Marine. London: Charles Griffin and Company, Limited. p. 64. "Third Mate."
- Friel, Ian (2003). Maritime History of Britain and Ireland. London: The British Museum Press. ISBN 0-7141-2718-3.
- Hope, Ronald (1990). A New History of British Shipping. London: John Murray. ISBN 0-7195-4799-7.
- Hope, Ronald (2001). Poor Jack: The Perilous History of the Merchant Seaman. London: Greenhill Books. ISBN 1-86176-161-9.
- Mission to Seafarers. "Mission to Seafarers Timeline Alongside World Events". Mission to Seafarers. Archived from the original on 16 September 2007.
- Owen, Douglas (1911). "Shipping" . In Chisholm, Hugh (ed.). Encyclopædia Britannica. Vol. 24 (11th ed.). Cambridge University Press. pp. 1045–1050.
- Press, Jonathan (1976). The Merchant Seamen of Bristol, 1747-1789 (Bristol Historical Association pamphlets, no. 38), 23 pp.
- Thompson, Captain Barry (2008). All Hands and the Cook: The Customs and Language of the British Merchant Seaman 1875–1975. Takapuna, NZ: Bush Press on behalf of the author. ISBN 978-0-908608-72-0.
