= Warsash Maritime School =

British maritime training college

Coordinates: 50.845°N 1.303°W

- Type: Public
- Established: 1902, previously known as Warsash Maritime Centre, & the Southampton School of Navigation
- Academic staff: Kunal Anand (Director) and Jonathan Ridley (Head of Engineering)
- Location: Southampton and Warsash, Southampton, Hampshire, UK
- Colours: Red and White
- Website: Maritime Solent

Warsash Maritime School, formerly Warsash Maritime Centre and Warsash Maritime Academy, is a maritime training college that is part of Solent University. The college provides education, training, consultancy and research to the international shipping and off-shore oil industries. It is one of the United Kingdom's colleges responsible for the training of the British Merchant Navy. The courses on offer cover a wide range of maritime education and training from deck and engineer officer cadetships, including degree pathways, to senior officer certificates of competency, together with the associated safety training.

The current college is split across several sites, with the main academy campus in Southampton City Centre, the practical campus (focusing on survival, medical are firefighting training) in Warsash and the Ship Handling Centre at Timsbury Lake. From 1946 to 2017, the School was primarily located at its historic Warsash site, just east of Southampton aside the River Hamble and Warsash village. In 2017, the school transitioned to new facilities, built at a cost of over £43 million in the city centre. Aside from a few remaining practical course facilities, the majority of the Warsash campus is now being converted to private housing.

== History and operations ==
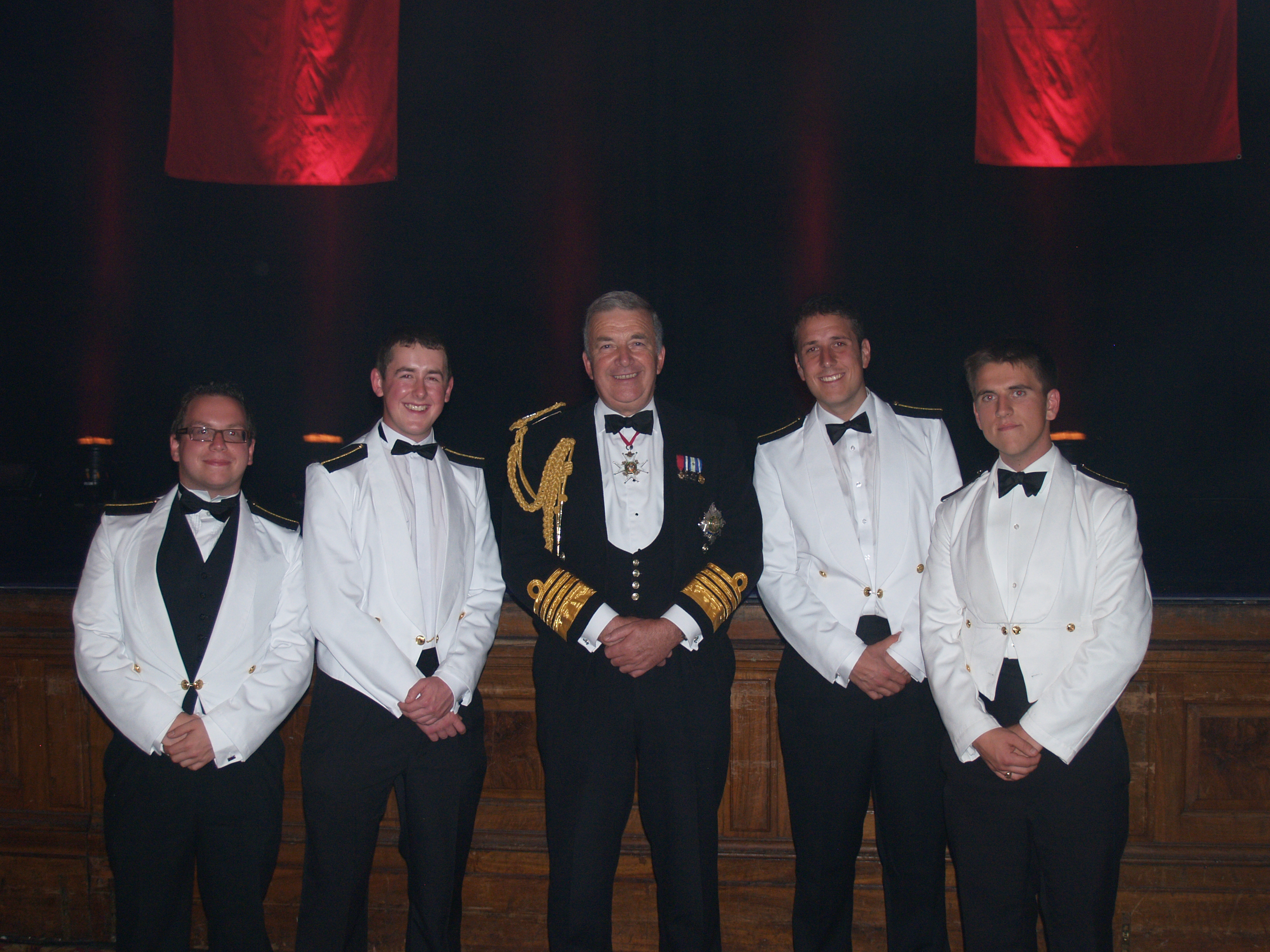
An example of Warsash Maritime Deck Cadets at their officer 'passing out' ceremony in Southampton, with Former First Sea Lord Admiral Baron West of Spithead.

The Southampton School of Navigation originated with the death of a Southampton wine merchant Henry Robinson Hartley, in 1850. He bequeathed £42,524 to the Southampton Corporation which they received some years later. After advice from the Secretary of the Department of Science, Lyon Playfair, it was decided that a School of Navigation should be set up, which would be fitting with the recent development of Southampton as a great seaport. After the need to raise additional funds the school was eventually finished in 1902. It was granted university college status and known as the Hartley Institute, based in South Hill in the city of Southampton.

In 1932 the school was expanded when it merged with the Gilchrist Navigation school. At that time the school was confined to preparing students for Board of Trade certificate examinations for Mate, Master and Extra Master. 51 students were taught at this time by only two staff. In 1934 the college expanded to accommodate day cadets and courses for civil air navigation. It was during this time that Captain Whalley Wakeford was appointed as head of the school. Residential cadet courses began in 1937 with cadets completing a sea preparatory course. By 1939 there were 19 cadets, 129 day students and 15 staff and the school moved to a new home at South Stoneham House in Swaythling where it remained until 1946.

During the Second World War the school remained open to train mariners. In 1940 all students and cadets had joined the Local Defence Volunteers (Home Guard). Courses continued to run despite bombing in the Southampton area. Cadets were still trained and additional courses were created for existing officers from the armed services and abroad, including some 60 free Polish cadets. By 1942 the school had over 180 sea cadets in training and it was decided the school should be moved to a larger campus, which incorporated the existing HMS Tormentor operations base, just outside the village of Warsash. At the request of the United States a special navigation course was provided in 1945 for naval officers stationed in the United Kingdom. By 1946 the entire school had moved to Warsash and included over 316 students and 32 staff (with the name of the college now officially recorded as the Southampton School of Navigation). In 1957 a new building programme at the college began (to replace the existing temporary WW2 structures). Three new residential blocks were created, as well as a refectory building and a new teaching block (including the Whalley Wakeford lecture theatre). One accommodation block Shackleton was finished in 1960 and won a Royal Institute of British Architects gold medal. By 1967 a new teaching block had again been constructed and the school was now offering tankers courses as well as Bsc in Nautical Science.

In 1970 Whalley Wakeford, the school's long-standing director, retired and the school removed itself from direct control of Southampton University. By 1978 the school had purchased additional grounds and had built a new fire school, to provide professional firefighting skills to mariners. Additionally the use of the week-based sea training out in the Solent also came to an end. Previously the college had its own small sized training vessels – Moyana (which, having won the Sail Training Association's first Tall Ships Race from Torbay to Lisbon in 1956 sank without loss of life on her return passage to the UK) and Halcyon which is now privately owned by Halcyon Yacht Charter. In 1986 the college went through a great change, when it merged with the Southampton College of Technology, meaning that for the first time engineers were trained on the same campus, as merchant navy deck officers. The school was renamed "Warsash Maritime Centre" and went through a period of building expansion which included a new pier, library and engineering block. It was not until the 1990s that the college would again change dramatically, when in 1996 some of the campus on the eastern side of Newtown road were sold, together with Golf House, Salterns and Hamblemeads, to fund the Andrews Building in Southampton.

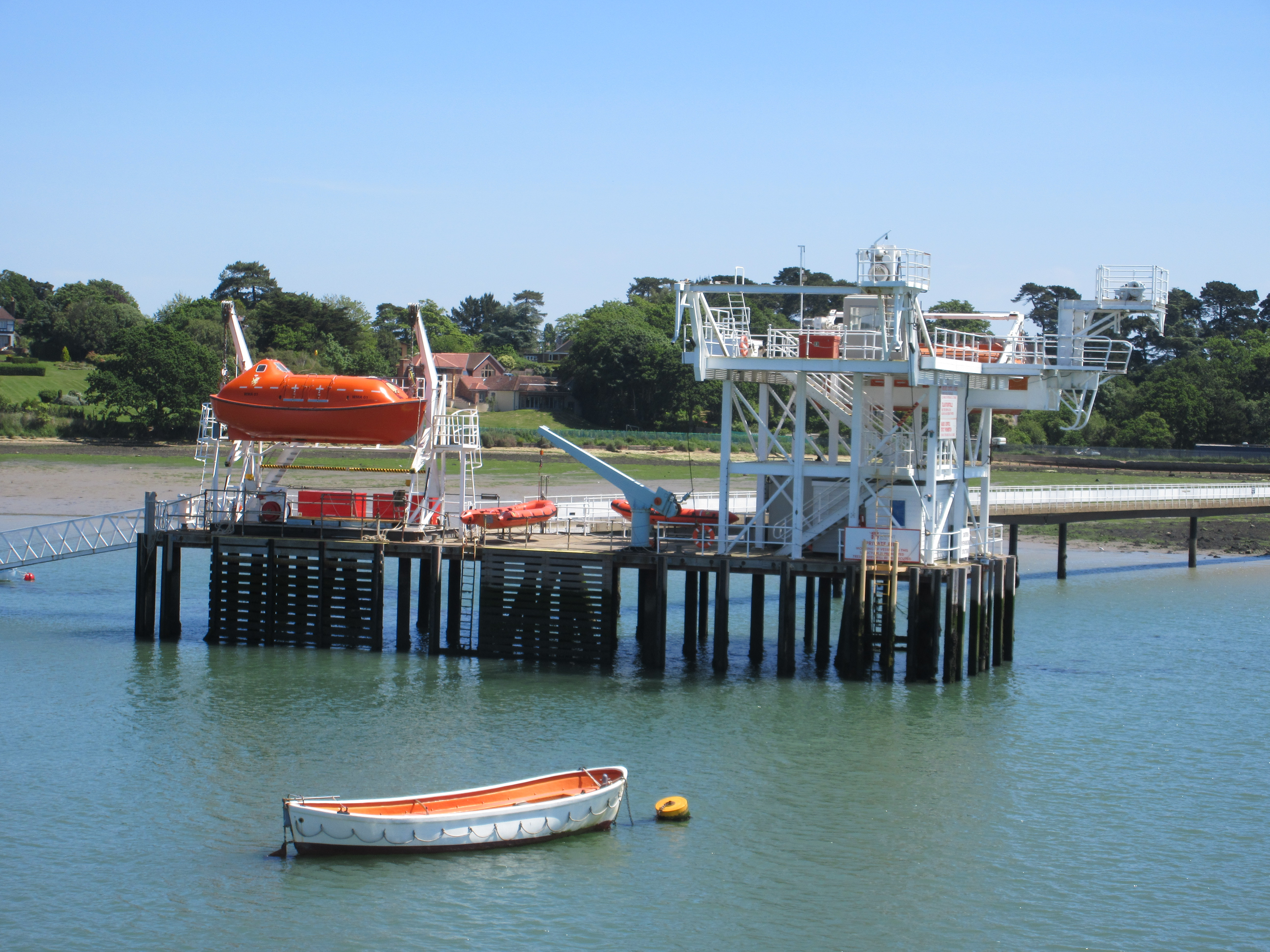
Warsash Maritime Academy survival craft facility

By the year 2000 the college had also built three new computer-based training simulators. It was during this period that Warsash Maritime Centre merged with Southampton Solent University to provide governmental sources of funding. The college was renamed Warsash Maritime Academy, and then in 2019 after relocating to Southampton's Solent University campus, the Warsash School of Maritime Science and Engineering which it is now known as today. The college now accommodates thousands of students throughout the year. Yearly cadets intakes follow two routes as set out by the MCA and are based on the Foundation Degree or Higher National Diploma Route. They specialise in either Deck Operations, Engineering or Electronics. The academy also runs additional training courses, including specialist STCW courses such as firefighting, sea survival and first aid. The academy also continues to train officers up to the rate of Master Mariner. Until 2017, cadets had three main accommodation blocks at the college (Hamblemeads, Blyth, Shackleton). All phase 1 cadets were required to stay in either Blyth or Shackleton accommodation blocks; although some senior cadets in later phases may be required/able to move into one of the main student hall complexes at Solent University.

=== Move to Southampton City Centre ===
In 2016, it was announced that the majority of teaching and accommodation facilities at the Warsash campus would be closed, with the school transitioning to new city centre facilities from 2017. The new facilities were officially opened in January 2018 by HRH Anne, Princess Royal and cadets began transitioning to the new site from 2017, with the move completed by 2019. In 2021, Lars Lippuner, a seafarer with a yacht background and previously a teacher at the School, became director of the school.

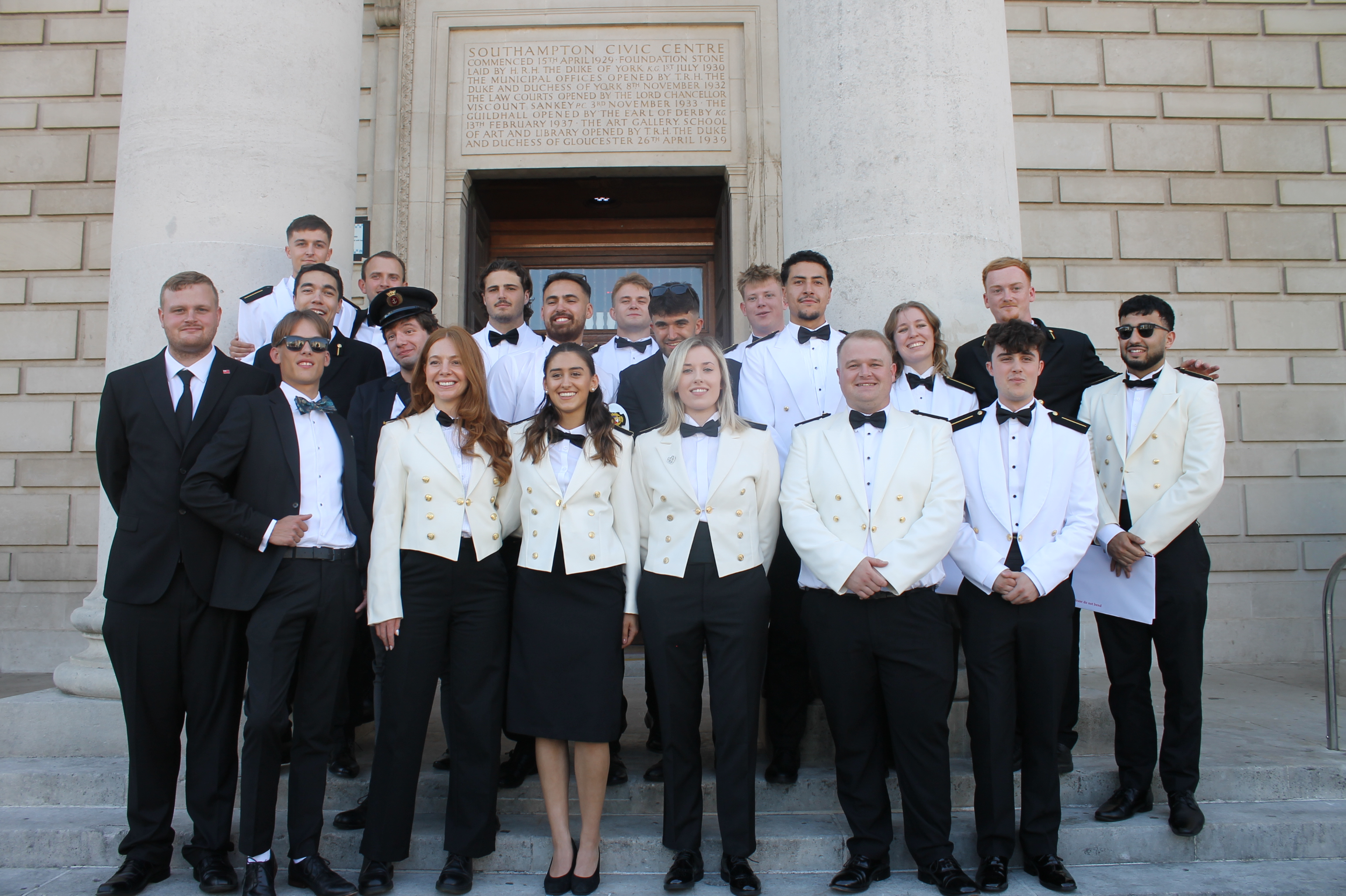
Deck Officer Cadets at the Warsash Maritime School 2025 Graduation Ceremony, hosted at the Southampton Guildhall.

In 2024, Lars Lippuner became Director of UK Customer Maritime Services at the UK Maritime and Coastguard Agency and Kunal Anand, a former lecturer took over as Director of the school. In 2024, Inmarsat donated a bridge simulator, with Global Maritime Distress and Safety System functionality, to the school.

== Training programmes ==
Warsash Maritime Academy provides the following education and training programmes:

- Marine operations management
- Marine engineering & management
- Shipping operations
- Officer cadet training programmes
- Merchant vessel operations (deck) programmes
- Merchant vessel engineering (engineer) programmes
- Bridge procedures training
- Firefighting training
- Maritime safety training
- Superyacht training

The school has a close working relationships with a number of colleges, such as Brockenhurst College who teach pre-cadetship areas of education.

== Facilities ==
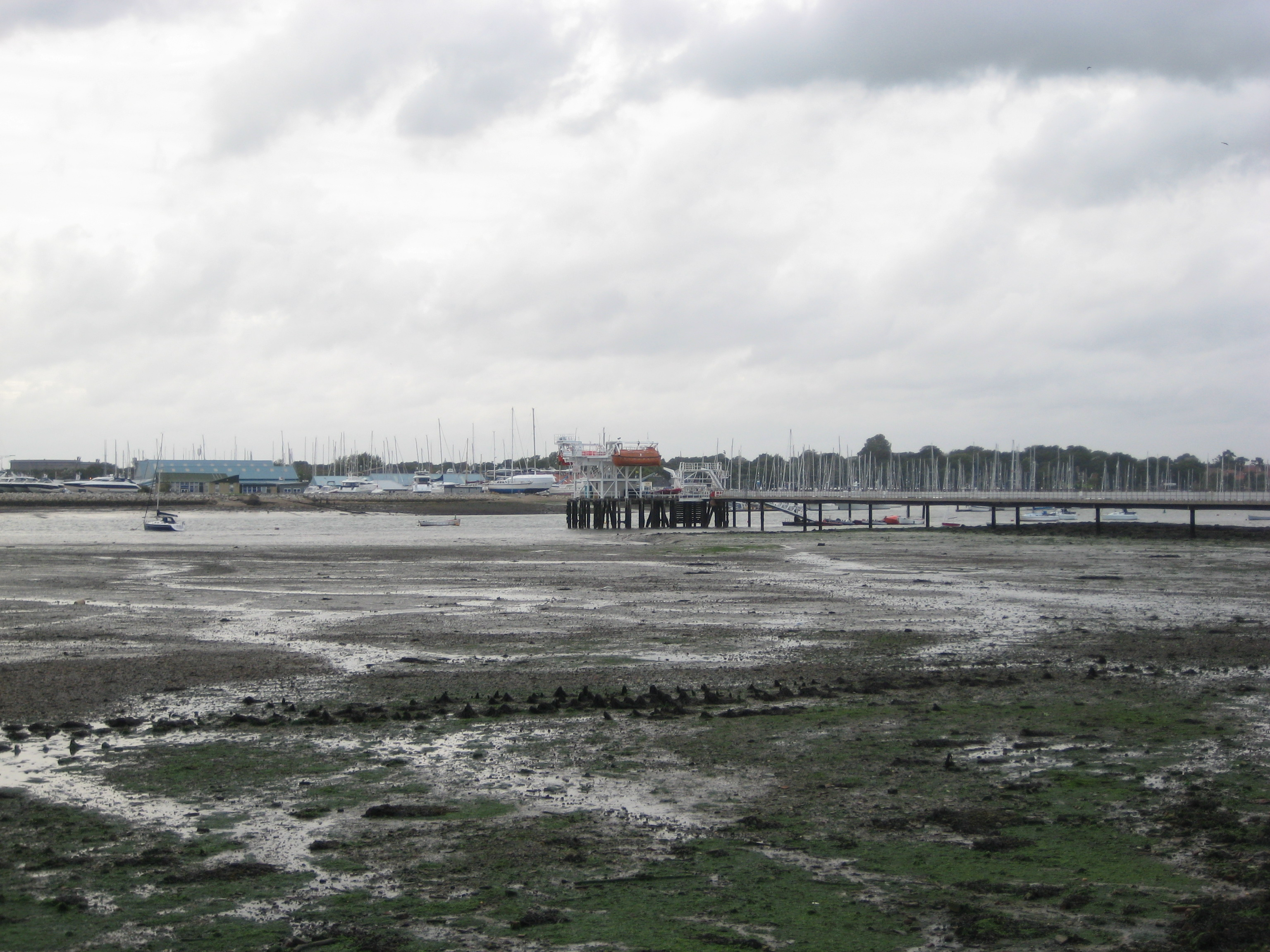
The Academy Pier, used for sea-survival and lifeboat training as well as watersports and motor boat training.

The Warsash Maritime Academy campus has the following facilities and simulators:

- Full mission bridge simulator
- Engine room simulator
- Vessel traffic simulator
- Steam plant simulator
- Liquid cargo operations simulator
- Multi-purpose simulator
- Communications/radio/GMDSS (Global Maritime Distress and Safety System) centre
- Fully equipped fire school and fire ground
- Engineering workshop
- Seamanship Centre
- Pier head with lifeboats and davits
- 10-acre (40,000 m^{2}) manned model lake (Ship Handling Centre)
- Library (plus access to the main library at Solent University).
- Entertainment and leisure facilities (IT suite, gym, cafeteria, bar etc.)
- Conference, classrooms and seminar rooms
- RYA/BCU-recognised watersports centre

=== Ship Handling Centre ===
In April 2009, Warsash Maritime Academy announced plans to move its manned model training facility for ship handling training, on scale model vessels in conditions that emulate real-life maritime experiences, to the UK's oldest existing reservoir. Using various ship models, berths, basins and channels on the new lake, a variety of port scenarios, canal transits and berthing operations can be simulated for ships' deck officers and pilots under training to practise their ship handling skills. Complex and potentially hazardous manoeuvres can be practised in safety in the manned models, making them a training tool for the shipping industry. Bringing maritime training to Timsbury Lake marked the beginning of a new chapter in Timsbury's history. The 9th century lake has over the years been a source of fish for the monks of Winchester, of water to drive a medieval water mill and the haunt of carp anglers. The ship handling centre has over four miles of waterways and 19 jetties for training. The manned model ship facility remains the only one in the United Kingdom. It is also one of only five such facilities in the world.

== Alumni ==
Alumni are able to join The Warsash Association which has a worldwide membership of 425 (as of February 2011) including overseas branches in Australia and New Zealand. The Warsash Association was established in 1984 and in 2013 presented a memorial plaque to the school citing the 13 Warsash cadets who lost their lives during the Second World War (the original plaque is in St Mary's Church, Hook with Warsash).

== Bibliography ==
- Aldridge, M. H. (1996). A history of the Southampton School of Navigation. The Southampton Institute.
