= Equivalent Royal Navy ranks in the Merchant Navy =

These are the equivalent Merchant Navy and Royal Navy ranks officially recognised by the British Government in the Second World War.

Naval Auxiliaries were members of the Royal Fleet Auxiliary and crews of Admiralty cable ships or merchant ships or commissioned rescue tugs requisitioned by the Royal Navy and coming under naval discipline.

RN rank	Deck Department	Engine Room Department	Catering Department
Commander	Master (over 10,000 tons)	Chief Engineer (over 10,000 tons)	
Lieutenant-Commander	Master (2,501-10,000 tons or up to 2,500 tons if home trade passenger ship of speed 15 knots or more or cable ship); First Mate (over 10,000 tons); Surgeon (over 10,000 tons)	Chief Engineer (2,501-10,000 tons or up to 2,500 tons if home trade passenger ship of speed 15 knots or more); Certificated Second Engineer (over 10,000 tons)	Purser (Naval Auxiliary; over 10,000 tons or 2,501-10,000 tons if at least two assistant pursers carried)
Lieutenant	Master (up to 2,500 tons unless home trade passenger ship of speed 15 knots or more or cable ship or home trade cargo ship up to 1,000 tons); First Mate (2,501-10,000 tons or up to 2,500 tons if home trade passenger ship of speed 15 knots or more or cable ship or Naval Auxiliary holding Master's Certificate); Certificated Second Mate (over 10,000 tons or Naval Auxiliary over 30 holding Master's Certificate); Certificated Third Mate (Naval Auxiliary; over 10,000 tons holding Master's Certificate); Surgeon (up to 10,000 tons)	Chief Engineer (up to 2,500 tons unless home trade passenger ship of speed 15 knots or more or home trade cargo ship up to 1,000 tons); Certificated Second Engineer (2,501-10,000 tons or up to 2,500 tons if home trade passenger ship of speed 15 knots or more or cable ship); Certificated Third Engineer (over 10,000 tons); Certificated Chief Refrigerating Engineer (holding 1st Class Certificate); Chief (or only) Electrician (cable ship or if 4 or more electricians carried)	Purser (over 10,000 tons or Naval Auxiliary 2,501-10,000 tons if at least one assistant purser carried); Senior Assistant Purser (Naval Auxiliary; over 10,000 tons or 2,501-10,000 tons if 3 or more pursers carried)
Sub-Lieutenant	Certificated Master (home trade cargo ship up to 1,000 tons); First Mate (up to 2,500 tons unless home trade passenger ship of speed 15 knots or more or cable ship or home trade cargo ship up to 1,000 tons); Certificated Second Mate (up to 10,000 tons unless home trade cargo ship up to 1,000 tons); Certificated Third Mate (except home trade cargo ship up to 1,000 tons); Certificated Junior Mate (except home trade cargo ship up to 1,000 tons); Radio Officer or Wireless Telegraphist (3 or more years' service)	Certificated Chief Engineer (home trade cargo ship up to 1,000 tons); Chief Engineer (Naval Auxiliary; commissioned rescue tug if not holding First Engineer's Certificate); Certificated Second Engineer (up to 2,500 tons unless home trade passenger ship of speed 15 knots or more or cable ship or home trade cargo ship up to 1,000 tons); Certificated Third Engineer (up to 10,000 tons unless home trade cargo ship up to 1,000 tons); Certificated Fourth Engineer (except home trade cargo ship up to 1,000 tons); Certificated Junior Engineer (except home trade cargo ship up to 1,000 tons); Certificated Chief Refrigerating Engineer (holding 2nd Class Certificate); Certificated Refrigerating Engineer; Chief Electrician (except cable ship); Second Electrician (Naval Auxiliary; ship carrying 4 or more electricians); Electrician (cable ship also carrying Chief Electrician); Certificated Boilermaker (Naval Auxiliary; 8,000 tons or over)	Purser (2,501-10,000 tons); Purser (Naval Auxiliary; up to 2,500 tons); Assistant Purser (Naval Auxiliary; 2,501-10,000 tons if only two pursers carried); Senior Assistant Purser (Naval Auxiliary; up to 2,500 tons); Junior Assistant Purser (Naval Auxiliary); Chief Steward (passenger ship over 10,000 tons or passenger ship 2,501-10,000 tons if no Purser carried)
Acting Sub-Lieutenant	Uncertificated Mate (Naval Auxiliary)	Uncertificated Engineer (Naval Auxiliary); Uncertificated Refrigerating Engineer (Naval Auxiliary); Chief (or only) Electrician (Naval Auxiliary; if only 1 or 2 electricians carried); Second Electrician (Naval Auxiliary; if up to 3 electricians carried); Electrician (Naval Auxiliary); Certificated Boilermaker (Naval Auxiliary; below 8,000 tons)	
Warrant Officer	Uncertificated Master (home trade cargo ship up to 500 tons); Uncertificated Mate (except home trade cargo ship up to 500 tons); Mate (home trade cargo ship 501–1,000 tons); Radio Officer or Wireless Telegraphist (1–3 years' service or Naval Auxiliary less than 3 years' service); Cable Foreman (cable ship)	Uncertificated Chief Engineer (home trade cargo ship up to 1,000 tons); Uncertificated Engineer (except home trade cargo ship up to 500 tons); Engineer (home trade cargo ship 501–1,000 tons); Senior Boilermaker; Electrician (except cable ship)	Purser (up to 2,500 tons); Assistant Purser; Chief Steward (passenger ship 2,501-10,000 tons if Purser also carried or passenger ship up to 2,500 tons or cable ship or Naval Auxiliary cargo ship over 10,000 tons)
Midshipman	Deck Apprentice or Cadet (Naval Auxiliary; 3 or more years' service); Radio Cadet (Naval Auxiliary; over 1 year's service)	Engineering Apprentice or Cadet (Naval Auxiliary; 3 or more years' service)	
Cadet	Deck Apprentice or Cadet (Naval Auxiliary; less than 3 years' service); Radio Cadet (Naval Auxiliary; up to 1 year's service)	Engineering Apprentice or Cadet (Naval Auxiliary; less than 3 years' service)	
Chief Petty Officer	Mate (home trade cargo ship up to 500 tons); Radio Officer or Wireless Telegraphist (less than 1 year's service); Deck Apprentice or Cadet; Radio Cadet; Boatswain; Carpenter; Plumber; Cable Jointer (cable ship); Assistant Cable Foreman (cable ship)	Engineer (home trade cargo ship up to 500 tons); Boilermaker; Uncertificated Boilermaker (Naval Auxiliary); Sanitary Engineer; Engineering Apprentice or Cadet; Chief Fireman or Stoker	Chief Steward (cargo ship); Chief Cook
Petty Officer	Boatswain's Mate; Carpenter's Mate; Chief Quartermaster; Hospital Attendant	Donkeyman; Pumpman; Engineroom Storekeeper; Engineroom Winchman; First Leading Fireman; Leading Hand Diesel; Electrical Assistant	Baker; Butcher; Second Steward; Senior Steward; Saloon Steward; Ship's Cook; Officers' Cook; First Writer; Head Waiter; Catering Storekeeper 1st Class
Leading Seaman	Craneman; Lamp Trimmer; Launchman; Leading Seaman; Painter; Quartermaster; Deck Storekeeper; Deck Winchman; Seaman Cable Jointer (cable ship); Cable Engine Driver (cable ship)	Greaser; Leading Fireman or Stoker; Assistant Engineroom Storekeeper	Second Cook (and Baker); Cook; Catering Storekeeper; Pantryman; Leading Steward; Second Writer
Able Seaman	Able Seaman; Ordinary Seaman; Seaman Cable Hand (cable ship)	Fireman or Stoker; Trimmer; Cleaner and Wiper	Assistant Catering Storekeeper; Second Baker; Assistant Baker; Assistant Butcher; Assistant Cook; Assistant Pantryman; Steward; Assistant Steward; Boy Steward

== See also ==
- British Merchant Navy
