= Carisbrooke Shipping =

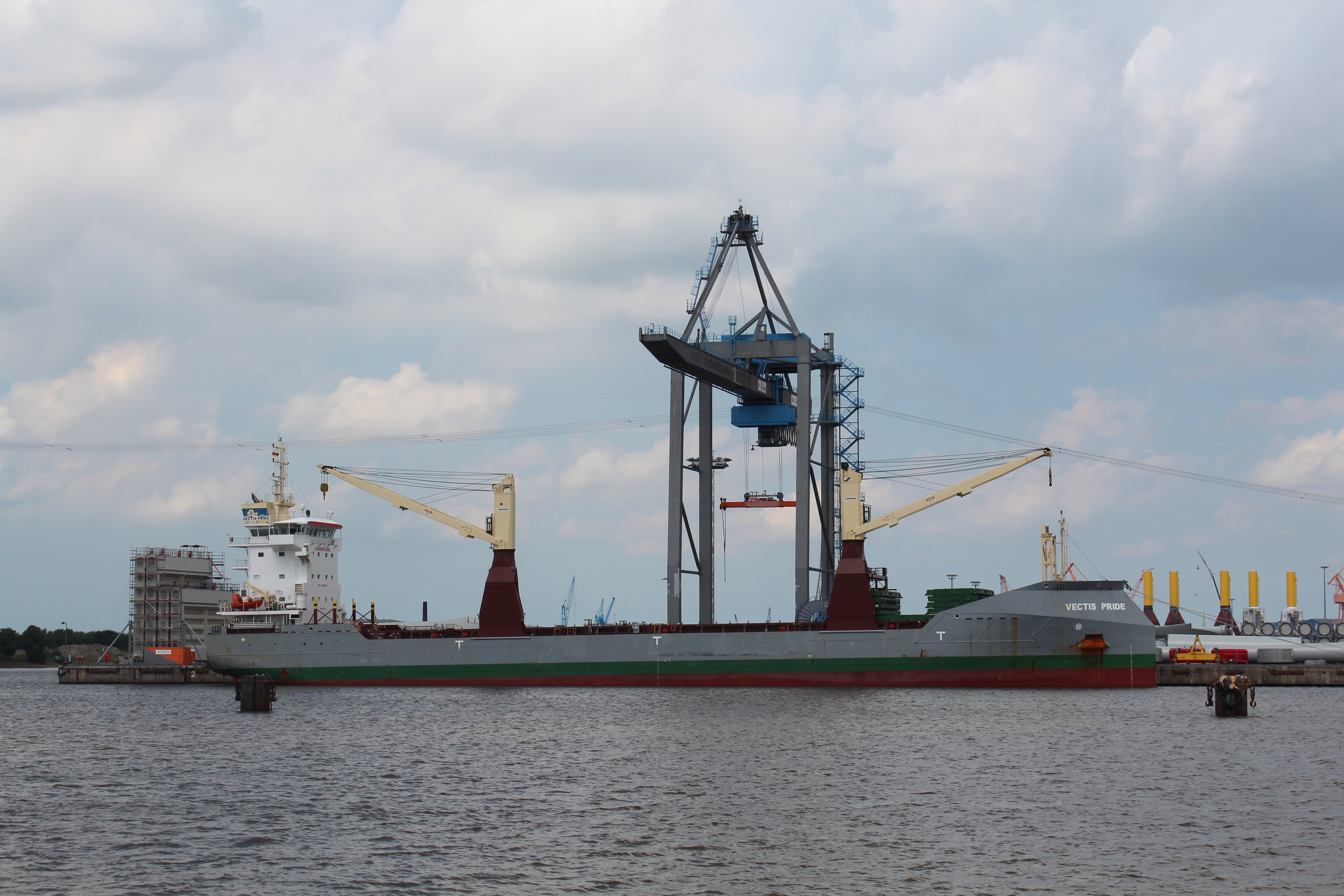
General Cargo Vessel Vectis Pride, IMO 9626132, built 2012 from Jiangsu Yangzijiang Shipyard at Jiangyin, China, Owner & Manager: Carisbrooke Shipping

Carisbrooke Shipping is a United Kingdom company concerned with shipping and marine operations. The company was established in December 1969. Their main office is located in Cowes, Isle of Wight. In January 2017 the company formally joined with Nova Marine Carriers.

== Fleet ==
As of 2017, the company website stated that they have 51 Dry Cargo and multi-purpose vessels in its fleet. This included eight 8,000GT Ice Class general cargo vessels acquired from Liberty One and Solmunde & Partners in 2015. The company transports bulk cargoes including grains, fertilizers, coal, and steel products. In addition, the company offers various technical and management services.
