= USNS John McDonnell =

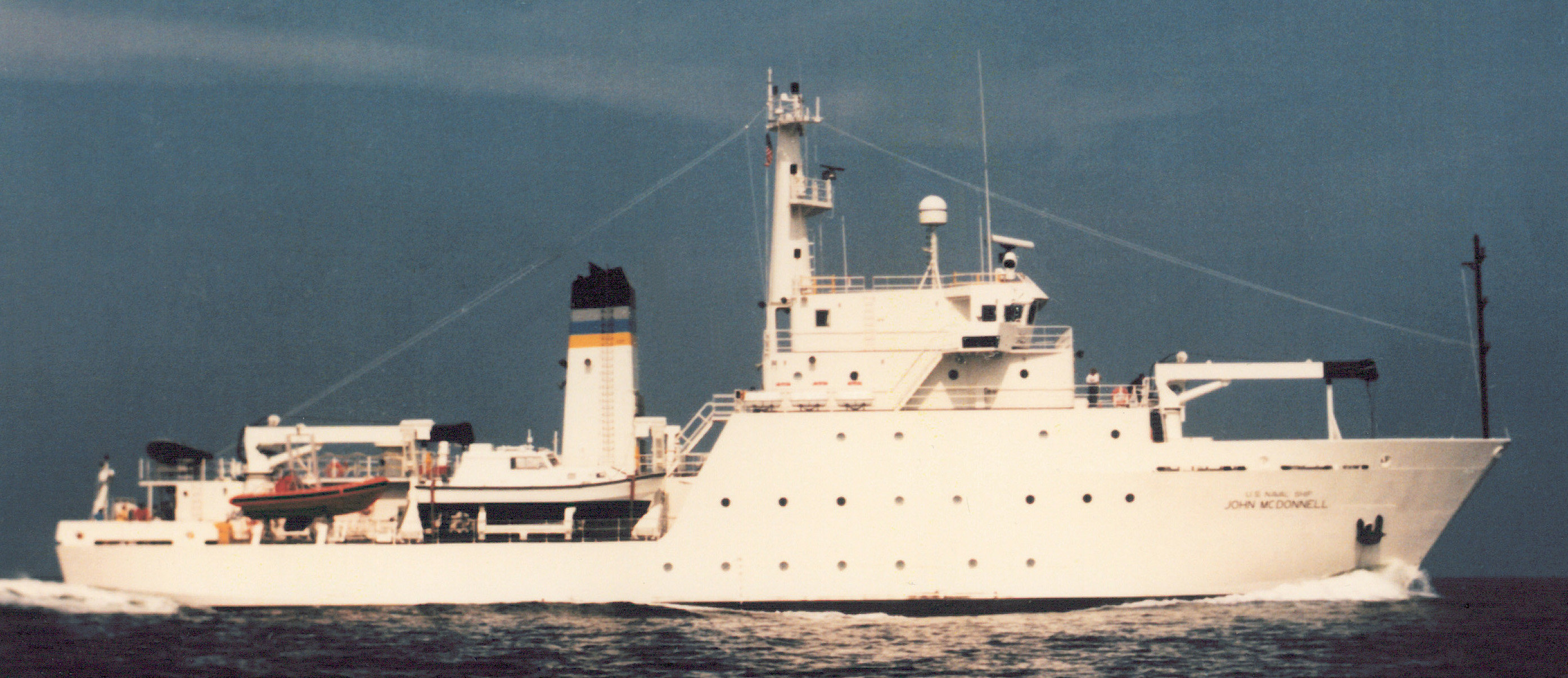

History

United States
- Name: USNS John McDonnell
- Namesake: Capt. John McDonnell
- Operator: United States Navy (1991-2010); United States Seafoods, LLC (2016-present)
- Awarded: 10 November 1988
- Builder: Halter Marine Moss Point, Mississippi.
- Laid down: 3 August 1989
- Launched: 13 December 1990
- In service: 15 November 1991
- Out of service: 25 August 2010
- Stricken: 25 August 2010
- Identification: IMO number: 8971138; Callsign: NJMD
- Honors and awards: Navy Meritorious Unit Commendation, National Defense Service Medal, Armed Forces Expeditionary Medal (2), Southwest Asia Service Medal, Armed Forces Service Medal (2)
- Status: In active service as a fishing vessel

General characteristics
- Displacement: 2,054 tons full
- Length: 208 ft 5 in (63.53 m)
- Beam: 45 ft (14 m)
- Draft: 34 ft 10 in (10.62 m) maximum
- Propulsion: 1 GM EMD 12-645E6 diesel; 2,500 horsepower (1.9 MW) sustained; 1 auxiliary diesel; 230 horsepower (172kW); 1 shaft.
- Speed: 12 knots (22 km/h)
- Complement: 22 Civilians and 11 Scientists

USNS John McDonnell (T-AGS-51) was a hydrographic survey ship operated by the Military Sealift Command (MSC) with a contract crew for the Naval Oceanographic Office which assigned a military and civilian hydrographic detachment to conduct coastal surveys. The ship and its sister, USNS Littlehales (T-AGS-52), were replacements for the coastal hydrographic survey vessels USNS Chauvenet (T-AGS-29) and USNS Harkness (T-AGS-32).

The keel was laid by Halter Marine, Inc. of Moss Point, Mississippi on 3 August 1989. Launch took place on 13 December 1990 with the wife of the ship's namesake, Mrs. Mary McDonnell, as sponsor. On 15 November 1991 John McDonnell was placed in service with MSC.

The new vessels were about half the length of those large survey ships with two rather than four survey launches. Contract crew size was 24 instead of 70 for the larger ships and the military and Naval Oceanographic Office civilian hydrographic detachment could be decreased from 80 to 10. With reliance on the Global Positioning System (GPS) for navigation and modern multibeam shallow-water sonar (SIMRAD EM100) and updated computer hardware and software for data processing the ships were expected to operate 24 hours a day, seven days a week collecting more soundings per mile than the older ships in coastal areas at depths up to 600 m (328 fathoms; 1,969 ft). The ships were equipped only for coastal survey operations and unlike the larger Pathfinder class vessels were not capable of both coastal and deep ocean surveys.

The vessels conducted hydrographic surveys in domestic waters in support of Navy missions and in international and foreign waters in support of the Mapping, Charting, and Geodesy (MC&G) requirements of the National Geospatial-Intelligence Agency and its predecessor organization the Defense Mapping Agency. Those MC&G requirements support all military operations and also civilian mariners with products outside the U.S. territorial waters that are the charting responsibility of NOAA.

After the Indian Ocean Tsunami the coastal survey ship along with the larger USNS Mary Sears were deployed from Sasebo, Japan to survey the area where the 9.0 magnitude earthquake occurred.

The John McDonnell aided in the location of two downed F-16s in the Northern Persian Gulf in 1993 and the wreckage of a Navy helicopter in the Strait of Hormuz in 1994. Two years later, it located a crashed F-14 in the Central Persian Gulf. In 2008, the vessel helped locate a Philippine Air Force (PAF) C-130 Hercules that crashed in Davao Gulf.

The Navy deactivated and struck the ship 16 August 2010 and delivered the ship to the Navy Inactive Ships Program, Pearl Harbor, Hawaii 25 August. As of August 2013, the General Services Administration was offering the ship at auction.

As of June 2016, the overhauled and re-christened Seafreeze America is currently owned and operated by United States Seafoods, LLC and serves as a fishing trawler in the Bering Sea sector.
