= USNS Pathfinder =

International Oceanographic Survey Ship

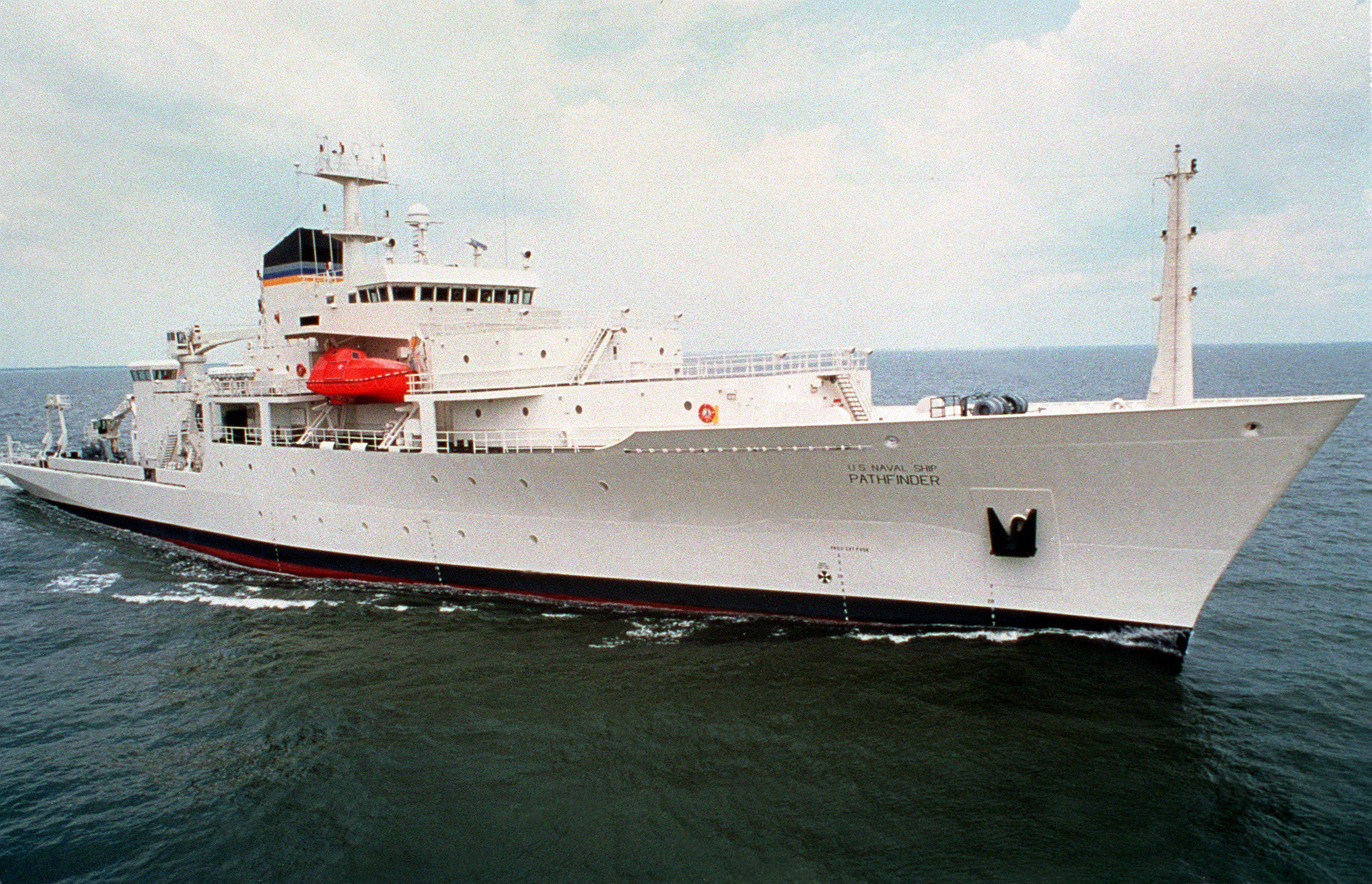

History

United States
- Name: Pathfinder
- Owner: United States Navy
- Operator: Military Sealift Command
- Awarded: 30 January 1991
- Builder: Halter Marine
- Laid down: 18 August 1992
- Launched: 7 October 1993
- In service: 28 October 1994
- Identification: IMO number: 9075199; MMSI number: 303925000; Callsign: NGKK; Hull number: T-AGS 60
- Status: in active service

General characteristics
- Class & type: Pathfinder-class survey ship
- Displacement: 4,762 long tons (4,838 t)
- Length: 328 ft 6 in (100.13 m)
- Beam: 58 ft (18 m)
- Draft: 19 ft (5.8 m)
- Speed: 16 knots (30 km/h; 18 mph)
- Complement: 28 mariners/28 sponsor personnel

USNS Pathfinder (T-AGS 60) is a United States Navy oceanographic survey ship, and the lead vessel of her class. Her mission is to collect acoustical, biological, physical, and geophysical surveys of the world's oceans. This data has many uses, but a primary focus is characterizing the ocean environment in order to improve the U.S. Navy's undersea warfare capabilities.

== Construction and characteristics ==
Halter Marine, Inc. won the contract to build Pathfinder and a second ship of her class in January 1991. The contract price for the two ships was $140 million. Pathfinder's keel was laid down on August 18, 1992. The ship was built at Halter Marine's Moss Point, Mississippi shipyard. She was launched on October 7, 1993 and christened by Beverly Nelson, wife of Stewart B. Nelson, the Senior Advisor to the Oceanographer of the Navy.

Her hull is constructed of welded steel plates. She is 328.5 feet (100.1 m) long, with a beam of 58 feet (18 m), and a draft of 19 feet (5.8 m). Her full-load displacement is 4,762 long tons (4,838 t). Her economic cruising speed is 16 knots (30 km/h; 18 mph), driven by a diesel-electric propulsion system. The system is powered by four 11,425-horsepower (8,520 kW) diesel generators. These, in turn, drive two 4,000 hp (3,000 kW) General Electric electric motors. Two Wärtsilä LIPS z-drives are driven by the motors, providing both propulsion and steering for the ship. She has a 1,500 hp (1,100 kW) bow thruster to improve maneuverability. The z-drives and bow thruster can be linked in a dynamic positioning system to keep the ship on-station while working. Pathfinder has an unrefueled range of 12,000 miles (19,000 km).

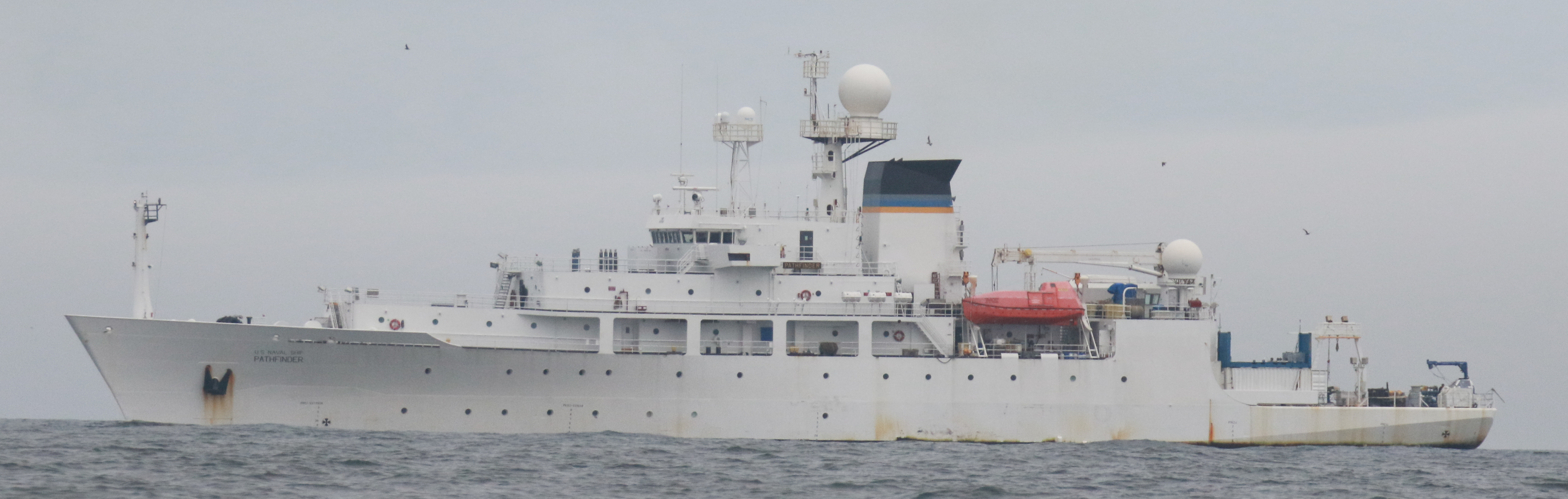
USNS Pathfinder in 2020 off the Washington coast

The ship has three cranes and five winches to lower and retrieve various instruments. Her instrumentation includes a Kongsburg EM122 multibeam echosounder, and towed sonar arrays. She can also carry a survey launch for work in shallow water.

The ship has a unionized, United States Coast Guard-licensed, civilian crew. Pathfinder's research and science missions are conducted by various naval and civilian personnel who change with the ship's changing missions. The ship can accommodate 28 crew and 27 scientists.

The ship is owned by the United States Navy, and managed by the Military Sealift Command, on behalf of the Naval Oceanographic Office. She is operated and maintained under contract by a private company. From 2012 until at least 2017, this was U.S. Marine Management, Inc., a subsidiary of the Danish shipping firm Maersk Line, Ltd.

The ship is named for Matthew Fontaine Maury, one of the United States' earliest oceanographers, who earned the epithet, "Pathfinder of the Seas." She is the third U.S. government survey ship of this name. The first, Pathfinder, built in 1898, was lost in the Philippines at the outbreak of fighting in World War II. The second Pathfinder, earned two battle stars in the Pacific during World War II.

== Operating history ==
Pathfinder has participated in hundreds of research projects all over the world. Those that have been made public are quite varied.

Pathfinder has hosted educational programs for schoolteachers and students to increase ocean awareness. In conjunction with the National Geographic Society, she sailed with three teachers and three students to Europe and Africa in the summer of 1997. In 2000 she completed a nine-day schoolteacher cruise in the Caribbean Sea. Thirteen schoolteachers were aboard for a ten-day educational cruise from Pearl Harbor, Hawaii, in 2006.

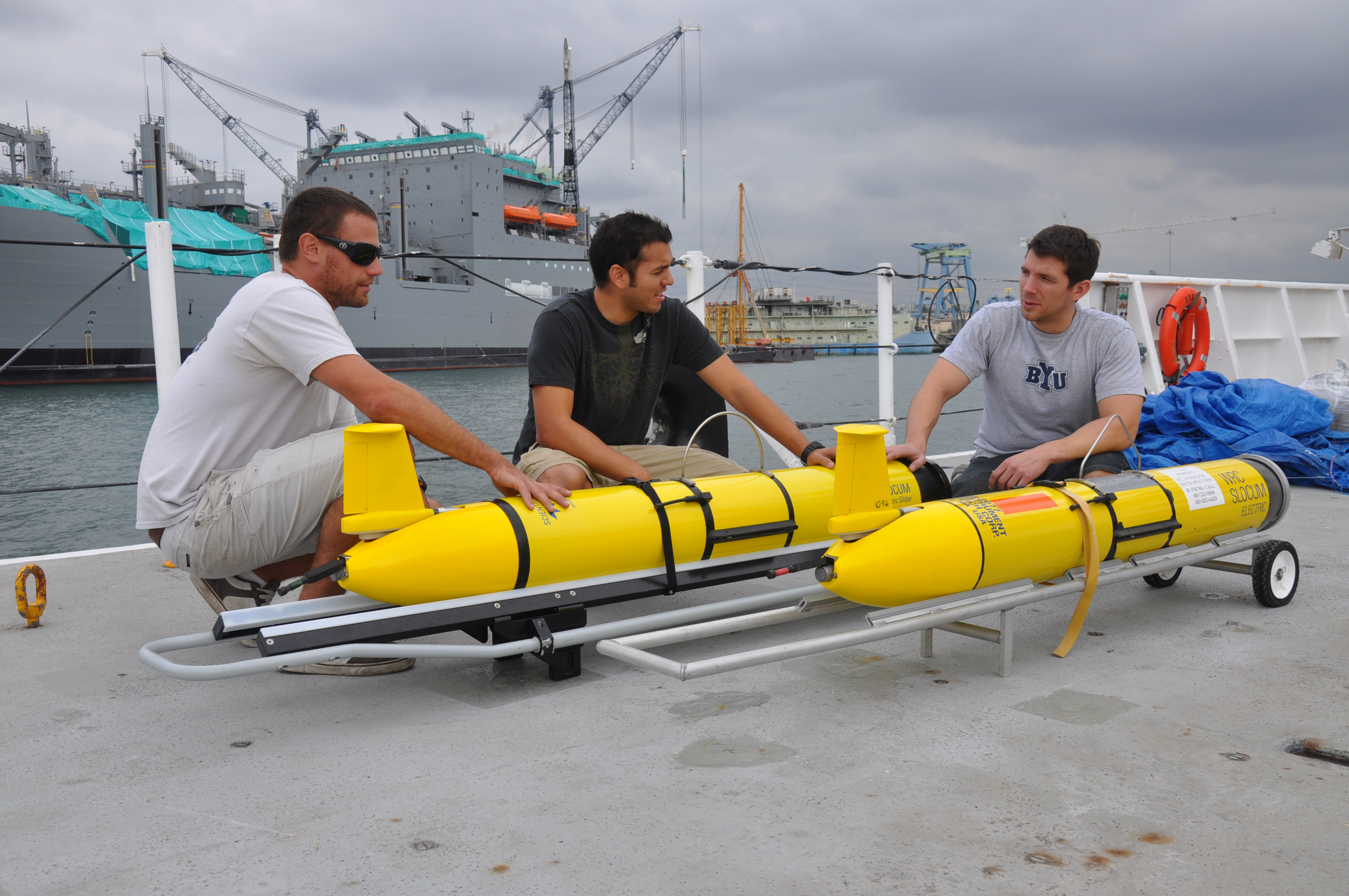
Littoral battlespace-sensing gliders aboard USNS Pathfinder

At the request of the Estonian government, in May 2008, Pathfinder searched the Baltic Sea for the wreck of an airliner shot down in 1940. In September 2008 she embarked on a similar mission with a Ukrainian survey team. Here she attempted to identify 15 wrecks in the Black Sea, including the World War I Russian minelayer Prut, and the World War II German submarine U-18.

In 2010 she hosted tests of littoral battlespace-sensing gliders, small autonomous undersea drones that survey the water column.

Pathfinder was off the coast of Nicaragua in September 2013 conducting ocean surveys. The Nicaraguan government protested that her activities in its exclusive economic zone violated the Law of the Sea Convention. The United States responded that military surveys were allowed under international law as a function of freedom of navigation. As part of the U.S. Southern Command's outreach efforts, in 2014 Pathfinder cooperated with governments in the western Caribbean to gather hydrographic and bathymetric data. On December 24, 2015 she was in the Bahamas for a memorial service for the sunken El Faro. Later that day she rescued a sailor from a sunken sailboat.
