= Pathfinder-class survey ship =

US Navy research ship class

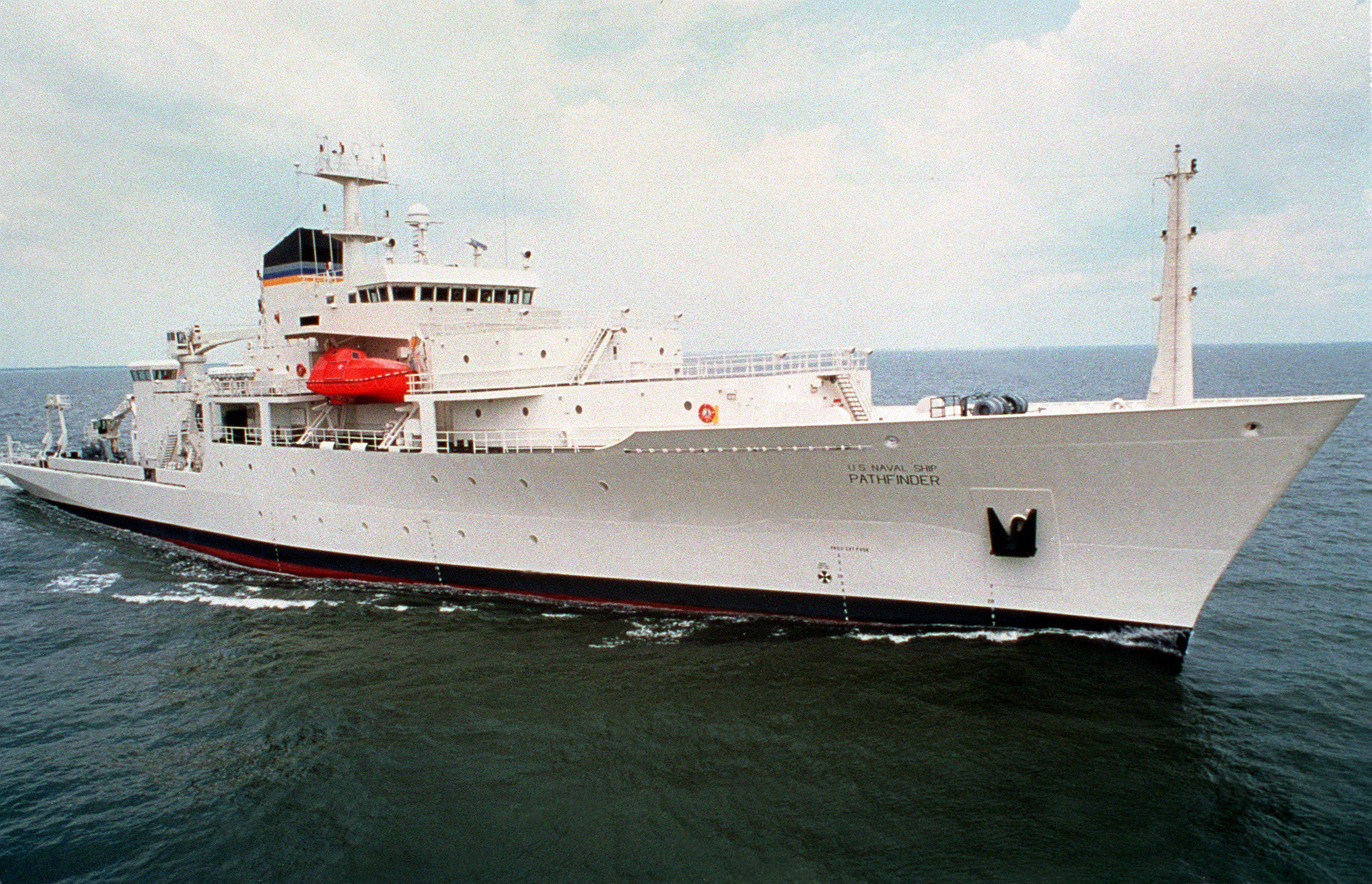
- USNS Pathfinder, the lead ship of her class, underway in 1994

Class overview
- Builders: Halter Marine
- Operators: Military Sealift Command
- In commission: 1994–present
- Planned: 8
- Building: 1
- Completed: 7
- Active: 6
- Retired: 1

General characteristics
- Type: Survey ship
- Displacement: 4,762 long tons
- Length: 329 ft (100 m)
- Beam: 58 ft (18 m)
- Draft: 19 ft (5.8 m)
- Propulsion: Diesel-electric; 4 EMD/Baylor diesel generators; 11,425 horsepower (8.52 MW); 2 GE CDF 1944 motors; 8,000 horsepower (5.96 MW) sustained; 6,000 horsepower (4.48 MW); 2 Lips Z drives; bow thruster, 1,500 horsepower (1.19 MW).
- Speed: Hull Speed (13,000 HP) 25 kn (29 mph) Cruise Speed (5,000 HP) 18 kn (21 mph) Economic Speed: 16 kn (18 mph)
- Complement: 26 Civilian Personnel/27 military sponsor personnel

The Pathfinder-class survey ships are owned by the United States Navy and operated by Military Sealift Command for the Naval Oceanographic Office ("NAVOCEANO"). They have mostly civilian crews, including scientists from NAVOCEANO.

The Pathfinder-class survey ships have three multipurpose cranes and five winches plus a variety of oceanographic equipment including multi-beam echo-sounders, towed sonars and expendable sensors. These ships are capable of carrying 34-foot (10 m) hydrographic survey launches (HSLs) for data collection in coastal regions with depths between 10 and 600 meters (33 and 1,969 ft) and in deep water to 4,000 meters (13,000 ft). A small diesel engine is used for propulsion at towing speeds of up to 6 knots (11 km/h; 6.9 mph). HSLs carry SIMRAD high-frequency active hull-mounted and side scan sonars. USNS Marie Tharp, the most recent addition to the survey ship fleet, is equipped with an 18-by-18-foot (5.5 by 5.5 m) moon pool for deploying and retrieving a variety of mission systems, including autonomous underwater vehicles (AUV).

The original contract for the Pathfinder-class of surveying ships was awarded in January 1991 for two ships with an option for a third, which was taken up May 29, 1992. A fourth ship was ordered in October 1994 with an option for two more. A fifth ship was ordered January 15, 1997. Construction began on the sixth ship in the class in 1999. By early 2002, six ships had been delivered and were performing active missions for MSC. The contract for a seventh ship, USNS Maury, was awarded in December 2009. In August 2014, USNS Sumner, was deactivated, and USNS Maury was delivered on February 16, 2016, restoring the survey fleet to six ships. On November 19, 2018, the Navy awarded a contract for advanced work for an eighth Pathfinder-class ship.

== Ships ==
There are eight ships in the Pathfinder-class:

- USNS Pathfinder (T-AGS-60)
- USNS Sumner (T-AGS-61) (struck in 2014, scheduled for disposal)
- USNS Bowditch (T-AGS-62)
- USNS Henson (T-AGS-63)
- USNS Bruce C. Heezen (T-AGS-64)
- USNS Mary Sears (T-AGS-65)
- USNS Marie Tharp (T-AGS-66) (formerly Maury, renamed 8 March 2023)
- USNS Robert Ballard (T-AGS-67)
