= USNS Henson =

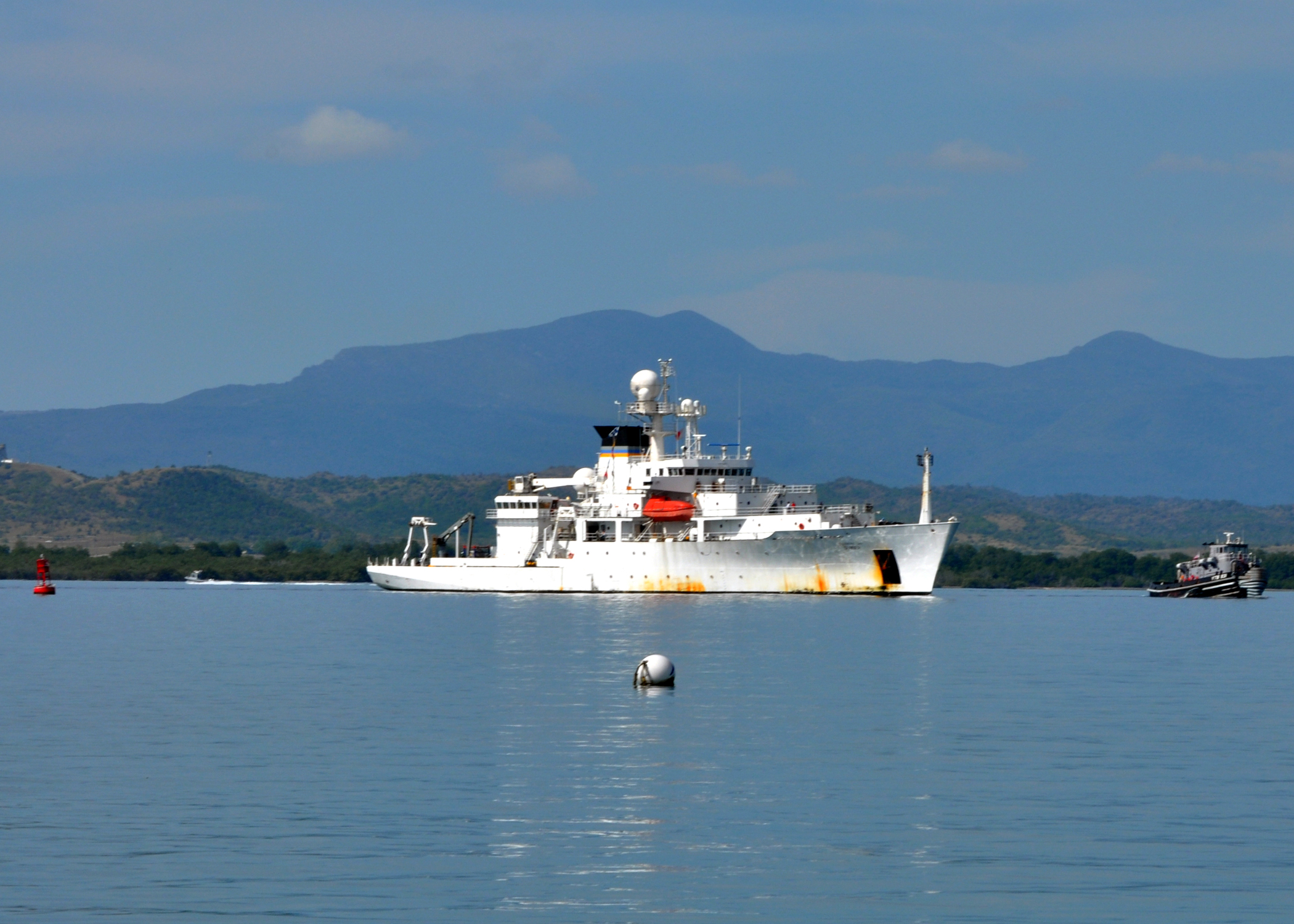
- Henson in Guantanamo Bay, January 2010

History

United States
- Name: Henson
- Namesake: Matthew Henson
- Owner: United States Navy
- Operator: Military Sealift Command
- Awarded: 20 October 1994
- Builder: Halter Marine
- Laid down: 13 October 1995
- Launched: 21 October 1996
- In service: 20 February 1998
- Identification: IMO number: 9132129; MMSI number: 368920000; Callsign: NENB
- Status: in active service

General characteristics
- Class & type: Pathfinder-class survey ship
- Displacement: 5,000 tons full 3,019 light
- Length: 329 ft (100 m)
- Beam: 58 ft (18 m)
- Draft: 19 ft (5.8 m)
- Speed: 16 kn (30 km/h)
- Complement: 28 mariners/27 sponsor personnel

USNS Henson (T-AGS-63) is a Pathfinder-class oceanographic survey ship. It is the fourth ship in the class. Henson is named after Matthew Henson, who accompanied Robert Peary, most famously on an expedition intended to reach the Geographic North Pole in 1909.

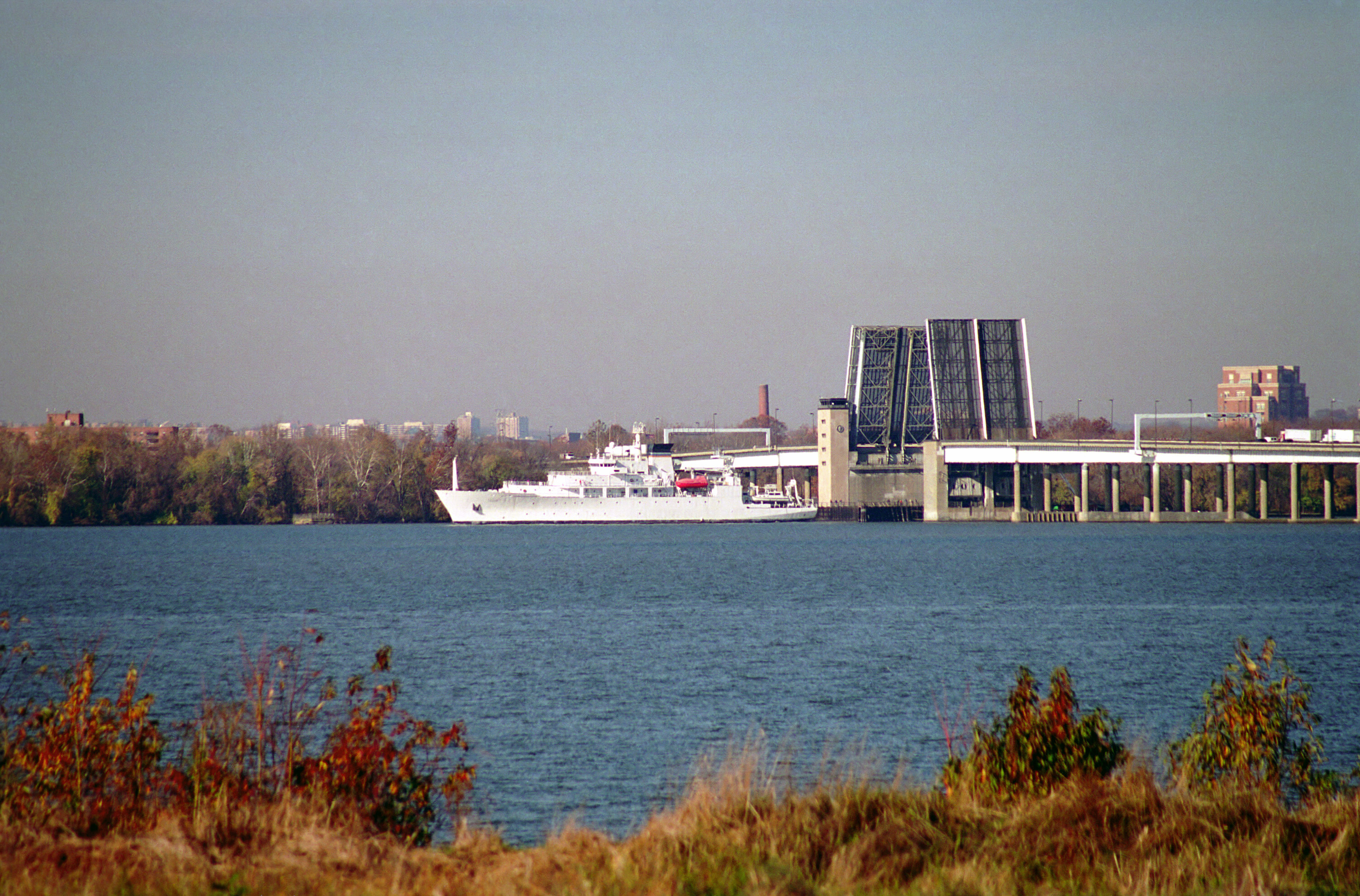
Henson on the Potomac River, November 1998

Henson participated in the search for the remains of USS Bonhomme Richard off the coast of Flamborough Head, England, during the week of 10 September 2010. The survey crew is composed of oceanographers from the Naval Oceanographic Office (NAVOCEANO) who planned and coordinated the U.S. Navy's participation in the search. Representatives from the U.S. Naval Academy, Office of Naval Research (ONR) and the Naval History and Heritage Command will also be aboard Henson to assist in the search and identification of found artifacts.
