= USNS Sgt. George D. Keathley =

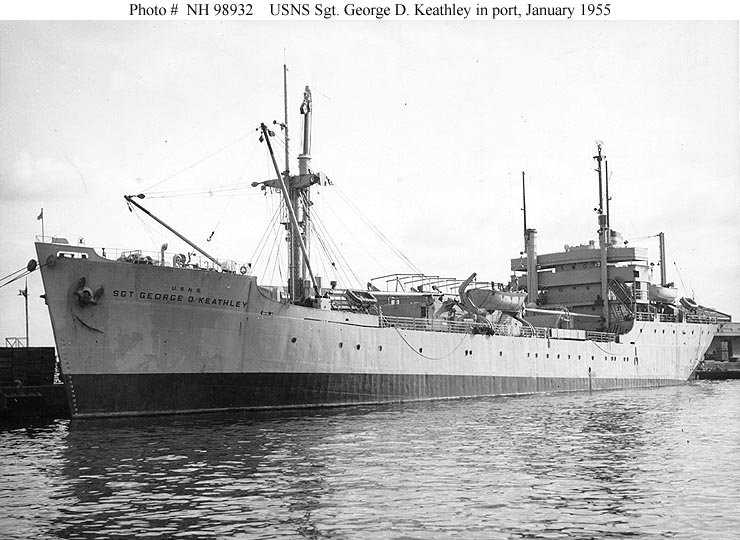
- USNS Sgt. George D. Keathley

History

United States
- Name: Alexander R. Nininger, Jr. (launch); Acorn Knot (delivery)
- Owner: US Maritime Commission
- Operator: Grace Lines
- Builder: Walter Butler Shipbuilders Inc.
- Laid down: 16 June 1944 as
- Launched: 7 December 1944
- Acquired: 30 March 1945
- Fate: Returned to the Maritime Commission

United States
- Name: Sgt. George D Keathley (T-APC-117)
- Out of service: 11 December 1965
- Stricken: 24 October 1957
- Honours and awards: 9 Campaign stars
- Fate: NDRF

United States
- Name: Sgt. George D Keathley (T-AGS-35)
- Acquired: 1 December 1966
- In service: 1967
- Out of service: December 1971
- Stricken: 15 April 1976
- Honours and awards: 9 Campaign stars
- Fate: Leased to the Republic of China

RoC
- Name: Chu Hwa (AGS-564)
- Stricken: August 1988
- Fate: Return to US custody; Sunk as target

General characteristics
- Class & type: Jonah E. Kelly
- Displacement: 6090
- Length: 338 ft 9 in (103.25 m)
- Beam: 50 ft 4 in (15.34 m)
- Draft: 17 ft 7 in (5.36 m)
- Speed: 11.5 kt.
- Complement: 48 (crew); 101 (troops)

USNS Sgt. George D. Keathley, was a World War II United States cargo vessel that was used for troop transport and later converted to a survey vessel. She was laid down and launched as MS Alexander R. Nininger Jr., then renamed MS Acorn Knot. She was put into US Army service as USAT Acorn Knot, then renamed USAT Sgt. George D. Keathley. She was transferred to the US Navy and became USNS Sgt. George D. Keathley (T-APC-117), but was later re-designated T-AGS-35. She was leased to the Republic of China, where she served as Chu Hwa (AGS-564). Both Nininger and Keathley were posthumous Medal of Honor recipients.

== History ==
The ship, a C1-M-AV1 design, was built under Maritime Commission contract (MC hull 2247), was laid down as Alexander R. Nininger, Jr., on 16 June 1944 by Walter Butler Shipbuilders Inc., Duluth, Minnesota; launched on 7 December 1944; sponsored by Mrs. G.A. Meyer; renamed Acorn Knot in February 1945; and delivered to the War Shipping Administration on 30 March 1945.

=== United States service ===
Operated initially by Grace Lines in the Atlantic and the Caribbean, Acorn Knot was returned to the Maritime Commission and transferred to the Army Transportation Corps on 28 July 1946 and assigned to the Ryukyus Command as an inter-island cargo carrier. On 6 May 1948, she departed the Far East for California; and, in July, she entered the Moore Dry Dock Company's yard at Oakland for conversion to a cargo-troop-passenger ship. During the eight-month conversion, spaces for troop and cabin passenger accommodations and for hospital facilities were constructed. The work was completed in early March 1949; and, on the 15th, she was renamed USAT Sgt. George D. Keathley.

On 19 April, Sgt. George D. Keathley sailed for Japan, where, in May, she resumed her Army Transportation Service on a schedule which included Japan, the Philippines, the Marianas, Okinawa, and Korea. When war broke out in the latter country in June 1950, Sgt. George D. Keathley was at Yokohama awaiting transfer to the Navy for service in the newly established Military Sea Transportation Service (MSTS). Within 24 hours of receipt of the news of the Communist crossing of the 38th parallel, she had taken on a full cargo of ammunition and a deck load of guns. On 27 June, she sailed for Sasebo, whence, with HMAS Shoalhaven, she continued on to Pusan. On 1 July, she became the USNS Sgt. George D. Keathley (T-APC-117); and, on the fourth, her civil service crew got her underway back to Japan to take on Army Signal Corps units and their equipment and' transport them to Korea.

With the completion of that run, the APC was assigned to shuttle service between Korea and Japan-evacuating hospital patients to Hakata and carrying troops and cargo to Pusan. In September, hospital ships took over that duty, and Sgt. George D. Keathley resumed cargo and troop operations out of Yokohama. During October, she carried cargo to the east coast of Korea, as far north as Hungnam. During November and early December, she carried troops and cargo to Inchon. Then, as the Chinese People's Volunteer Army added men and equipment to the Communist effort and pushed back down the peninsula, she assisted in the evacuation of that port-carrying Korean nationals to Pusan and cargo and ammunition back to Japan.

From 6 January to 2 March 1951, the APC was at Yokohama for overhaul. She then resumed shuttle runs between Japan and Korea. With November, she commenced runs to Okinawa and Formosa; and, in September 1952, after more bunk spaces had been added to her troop quarters, she resumed a Japan-Korea schedule which was alternated with runs to Okinawa and Formosa until February 1953. From then until the signing of the truce in July, she operated primarily between Sasebo and Pusan, with only two runs to Naha and Keelung.

After the Korean War, Sgt. George D. Keathley remained in the Far East and continued to be employed primarily between Sasebo and Pusan for another two years. In 1955, she was transferred to MSTS Atlantic; and, on 11 December 1956, she was placed out of service and transferred, temporarily, to the Hudson River Group of the Maritime Administration's National Defense Reserve Fleet (NDRF). Ten months later, on 24 October 1957, her name was struck from the Navy list and her transfer to the NDRF was made permanent.

In late 1966 Sgt. George D. Keathley was ordered activated. In November, she was towed to Norfolk, Virginia for conversion to a survey ship. On 1 December, she was reacquired by the Navy; assigned to MSTS; and given the designation T-AGS-35. In May 1967 the ship joined Sgt. Curtis F. Shoup, which had been assigned during November 1966, to meet increased demand for gravity data, in gravity, magnetic and bathymetric surveys for military use under technical control of the Naval Oceanographic Office.

In the spring of 1970 the ship was equipped with an early shipboard data acquisition and processing system designated the Hydrographic Data Acquisition System (HYDAS) based on the PDP-9 computer. One computer was dedicated to real time collection of survey data and another to processing the data for making nautical charts or being a backup for the real time data collection in event of failure of that computer. A real time navigation plot was generated on a flatbed plotter. The processing computer processed data collected by the ship. By September the system was still undergoing shakedown and evolution to a fully operational survey system. HYDAS, with an associated sounding boat collection system, was also designed to support coastal hydrographic surveys and was installed aboard the coastal survey ships Chauvenet (T-AGS-29) and Harkness (T-AGS-32). The system aboard Keathley supported the ship's deep ocean bathymetry and geophysical survey mission. (Note: Keathly ceased surveying and returned for inactivation in December 1971. Wyman (T-AGS-34) was acquired in November 1971. HYDAS was part of the equipment installed aboard the new ship. With the system being shaken down in 1970 with operational testing aboard Keathley during 1971 it is possible that the Keathley system was transferred to Wyman. By the mid 1970s the system was obsolete for the deep ocean mission and replaced aboard Wyman.)

The ship continued those surveys for the Oceanographer of the Navy until December 1971 when she returned to the United States for inactivation. Sgt. George D. Keathley was awarded nine campaign stars for her service during the Korean War.

=== Later service ===
On 29 March 1972, she was transferred, on lease, to the Republic of China, where she was named Chu Hwa (AGS-564).

On 15 April 1976, she was struck from the US Naval Vessel Register. She was struck from the China Naval Register in August 1988 and returned to US custody. She was ultimately sunk as a target.
