= Mary Sears (oceanographer) =

American oceanographer

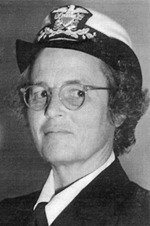
- Born: July 18, 1905; Wayland, Massachusetts, U.S.
- Died: September 2, 1997 (aged 92); Woods Hole, Massachusetts, U.S.
- Military career
- Allegiance: United States
- Branch: United States Navy
- Service years: 1943–1963
- Rank: Commander
- Commands: Oceanographic Unit of the Navy Hydrographic Office 1943–1946
- Awards: Johannes Schmidt medal in 1946 for contributions to marine research and Navy oceanography during WWII.
- Other work: co-founding editor of the journal Deep-Sea Research, founding editor of the journal Progress in Oceanography

Mary Sears (July 18, 1905 – September 2, 1997) was a commander in the United States Naval Reserve and an oceanographer at the Woods Hole Oceanographic Institution (WHOI).

== Early life and education ==
Mary Sears was born on July 18, 1905, to Leslie (née Buckingham) and Edmund Sears in Wayland, Massachusetts. She was the oldest child, and had a younger brother and sister. In 1911, Leslie died from polio when she was 28-years-old. After his wife's death, Edmund moved to Europe and left his children in the care of relatives and nannies. During this time, one of their caretakers was their mother's friend, Sophie Bennett, who was a teacher at The Winsor School in Boston, Massachusetts. Sears enrolled in the Winsor school in 1915 as a fifth-grade student. Later that year, Edmund returned from Europe, and began dating Bennett, and married her several years later. They had three children together. Sears graduated from The Winsor School in 1923, and enrolled in Radcliffe College in Cambridge, Massachusetts, where Bennett was an alumna. She originally intended to major in Ancient Greek, but after taking a biology course taught by George Howard Parker decided to change her course of study. In 1927, she graduated magna cum laude with a degree in zoology and was a member of the Phi Beta Kappa honor society. She remained at Radcliffe for graduate school, and earned a master's degree in 1929 and a Ph.D. in zoology in 1933. While a graduate student, she worked at Harvard University with Henry Bigelow, a founder and the first Director of the Woods Hole Oceanographic Institution (WHOI).

== Career ==
=== Postdoctoral research ===
After completing her doctorate, Sears studied plankton at WHOI during the summers, and taught throughout the school year. She was a faculty member at Wellesley College from 1938 to 1943, and also worked at the Museum of Comparative Zoology. During this time, she also served as a research assistant at Harvard from 1933 to 1949 and as a tutor at Radcliffe from 1934 to 1940. Sears was present for many of the early discussions organizing WHOI as it acquired its first ships, the 142-foot ketch Atlantis and 40-foot coastal vessel Asterias, and its first laboratory, later named the Bigelow Laboratory. Sears also researched the annual fluctuations of marine zooplankton. With Bigelow, Sears published papers on the salinity and the zooplankton of the area from Cape Cod to Chesapeake Bay, and worked on zooplankton further north in the Gulf of Maine.

In August 1941, she went to the Chincha Islands in Peru as a Faculty Fellow for Wellesley College's Committee on Inter-American Cultural and Artistic Relations. Sears was asked to come to Peru to study the plankton to determine if their reduced numbers led to birds dying, which caused a disruption to the guano industry on the islands. Despite the risk of working on a ship during World War II, Sears elected to make the trip to advance her career, as time at sea was considered necessary for oceanographers, but women were not permitted to work on US research vessels. Sears was at sea during the attack on Pearl Harbor, and remained on the ship for three more months until she returned to Woods Hole in March 1942.

=== World War II ===
In late 1942, Sears applied to the WAVES, an all-woman component of the United States Navy Reserve. She was denied due to a prior diagnosis of arthritis in her fingers. Roger Revelle, a naval lieutenant from Scripps Institution of Oceanography assigned to the US Navy Hydrographic Office, met with Columbus O'Donnell Iselin, the director of WHOI, to ask for oceanographers to assist the US Navy. Iselin volunteered Sears, and Revelle coordinated for her to be commissioned in the WAVES.

Following a letter of support from Rear Admiral George S. Bryan, the head of the Hydrographic Office, Sears received a medical waiver for her arthritis and was accepted into the WAVES in January 1943. She attended Naval Midshipmen's School at Mount Holyoke College, and was commissioned as a lieutenant (junior grade) on April 7, 1943. Sears was assigned to the Hydrographic Office in Suitland, Maryland, and began working to produce oceanographic charts ahead of planned amphibious assaults in Pacific Theater. Within one month of her arrival, she published research on sea drift, to better help the Navy find crew and debris in the ocean after their ships sank or airplanes crashed. Sears led an oceanographic team that included Fenner A. Chace Jr., Mary Grier, and Dora Henry.

The Battle of Tarawa in November 1943 began with an amphibious assault that left US Marines exposed to enemy fire on a coral reef due to misjudging of the tides. As a result, the US Navy relied more on its oceanographers when planning its landings. Sears led an oceanographic team that prepared reports for potential landing areas to be distributed to field commanders. Much of the information they received were from Japanese scientific journals. In 1944, Sears raised concerns over the potential hazards of an amphibious landing in Palau; low tides over the surrounding coral reef were predicted for around the invasion, which would hinder the assault. Additionally, the temperature gradient in the ocean water made sonar detection difficult around the islands. Due to operational necessity, the Marines still conducted a landing on Peleliu, an island in Palau, despite the concerns raised by the Hydrographic Department.

In 1944, Sears and her team began preparing reports for the planned invasion of Taiwan. She was also often called to produces urgent reports on tides for planned invasions; the secrecy of the invasions meant that Sears was the only oceanographer entrusted to produce these reports. In October 1944, the plans to invade Taiwan were cancelled, and the Hydrographic Office began preparing reports for an invasion of Luzon. In 1945, Sears began preparing reports for the Battle of Okinawa. The Hydrographic Office had previously created a report on the Ryuku Islands, of which Okinawa is the largest island, but could not find much information. American forces captured Japanese charts, which were transferred to the Hydrographic Office for analysis. Sears was able to narrow the list of potential beachheads, and highlighted the dangers of Okinawa being surrounded by a coral reef and experiencing high waves. Sears conducted further research, and reported that landing in western Okinawa would be ideal to avoid dangerous waves. During this time, she also worked with Vice Admiral Charles A. Lockwood, the commander of the Pacific submarine fleet, to allow the submarines to safely operate.

On October 19, 1945, it was announced that the Hydrographic Office would be expanded the Oceanographic Division, which Sears would lead. She was promoted to lieutenant commander, and worked as a Navy oceanographer until she left active duty on June 4, 1946. On May 20, 1946, Admiral Chester Nimitz issued a commendation for Sears, thanking her for the benefit of having oceanographic data.

=== Post-World War II ===
After she left active duty, Sears spent a year in Copenhagen where she researched siphonophores. She held a Rask-Orsted Foundation grant and received the Johannes Schmidt medal in 1946 for her many contributions to marine research. In 1947, she returned to Woods Hole, and transferred to the Naval Volunteer Reserves where she was the only woman in the Woods Hole unit and was elected officer in charge of the unit in 1950. She retired as a commander in the U.S. Naval Reserve in 1963.

When Sears returned to Woods Hole Oceanographic Institution, she was named a Senior Scientist in the Biology Department, a position she held until her retirement in 1970. Sears remained active at Woods Hole Oceanographic Institution until late in life, working with Joan Hulburt from an office in Bigelow Laboratory. From 1962 to 1973 she compiled and edited the Institution's Annual Report and Summary of Investigations. She also compiled the Collected Reprints of the Institution from 1959 to 1975, and compiled the Oceanographic Index, 1971–1976. She was named a Scientist Emeritus in 1978.

== Publications ==
Since women were not permitted to go to sea until many years later, Sears made her mark in marine science by editing the journals and books in which oceanographers published their results. In 1953, she was a founding editor of Deep-Sea Research, serving as editor from 1953 to 1974. She also helped establish Progress in Oceanography and served as its first editor-in-chief.

Sears edited several books that are considered milestones on documenting the history of marine science. Oceanography, considered by many as the benchmark against which future research was evaluated, was published by the American Association for the Advancement of Science in 1961. The Science article reviewing the book noted "...[they] know of no other volume that so well defines oceanography, its purpose, opportunities, and requirements".

Oceanography: The Past was co-edited with Daniel Merriman as part of the Third International Congress on the History of Oceanography, held at Woods Hole in September 1980 in celebration of the Institution's fiftieth anniversary. Long-time friend and colleague Roger Revelle described Sears in a paper he presented at that Congress as "the conscience of oceanography who initiated and maintained an uncompromising standard of excellence in scientific publications about the oceans.... She played a major role in creating the present world community of oceanographers from numerous countries and almost as many specialties."

== Awards and honors ==
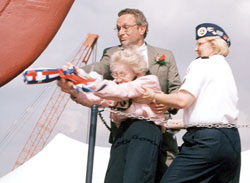
Officials assist Leila Sears, Mary's sister, as she christens the Navy's newest research vessel: USNS Mary Sears. (Photo courtesy of US Navy)

Sears was elected a Fellow of the American Association for the Advancement of Science in 1960 and a Member of the American Academy of Arts and Sciences in 1964.

On the occasion of her 80th birthday in 1985, Deep-Sea Research dedicated an issue to Sears, noting that she "has probably played a greater role in the advancement of oceanographic studies than any other woman." She received an alumnae honorary degree in 1962 from Mount Holyoke College and an honorary doctorate in 1974 from Southeastern Massachusetts University (now University of Massachusetts Dartmouth). Radcliffe College honored Sears in 1992 with its Alumnae Recognition Award, given to "women whose lives and spirits exemplify the value of a liberal arts education." In 1996 the Falmouth Business and Professional Women's Organization presented its "Woman of the Year" award to Mary for her many professional and community contributions.

Commander Sears' military awards include the American Campaign Medal, World War II Victory Medal, Naval Reserve Medal and the Armed Forces Reserve Medal.

In October 2000, the U.S. Navy recognized her service by launching a 300-foot research vessel named in her honor. The Oceanographic Survey Ship USNS Mary Sears is one of seven research vessels in operation today. Sears was also recognized in 1996 at the retirement celebration for Research Vessel Atlantis II which she had christened as sponsor.

There are two awards named after Sears. The Oceanography Society presents the Mary Sears Medal in recognition of extraordinary accomplishments in biological oceanography, marine biology, or marine ecology. In 1994, the Woods Hole Oceanographic Institution established the Mary Sears Women Pioneers in Oceanography Award

== Professional associations ==
Mary Sears chaired and helped to establish the First International Congress on Oceanography, held at the United Nations in New York in 1959. She also served on the Joint Committee on Oceanography of the International Council of Scientific Unions from 1958 to 1960.

She served as a Trustee of the Marine Biological Laboratory from 1956 to 1962 and was a Trustee Emeritus from 1976 until her death in 1997. She also was a Life Member of the Corporation of the Bermuda Biological Station.

== Philanthropic activities ==
Beyond her roles in international marine science, Mary Sears served the community and Town of Falmouth. She was a member of the Falmouth School Committee from 1952 to 1973, and was elected chair in 1961 a position she served until 1969. She also served on the School Committee for the Upper Cape Cod Regional Vocational technical School District from 1963 to 1965, and as Area 3 Chairman, Third Vice President and a member of the Executive Committee of the Massachusetts Association of School Committees during the 1960s. She served on and was chairman of the committee operating the Children's School of Science in Woods Hole, and for 35 years was a Falmouth Town Meeting Member. She was also active as a member of the Republican Town Committee and a member of the Falmouth Citizens Committee for Open Spaces.
