= USNS Chauvenet =

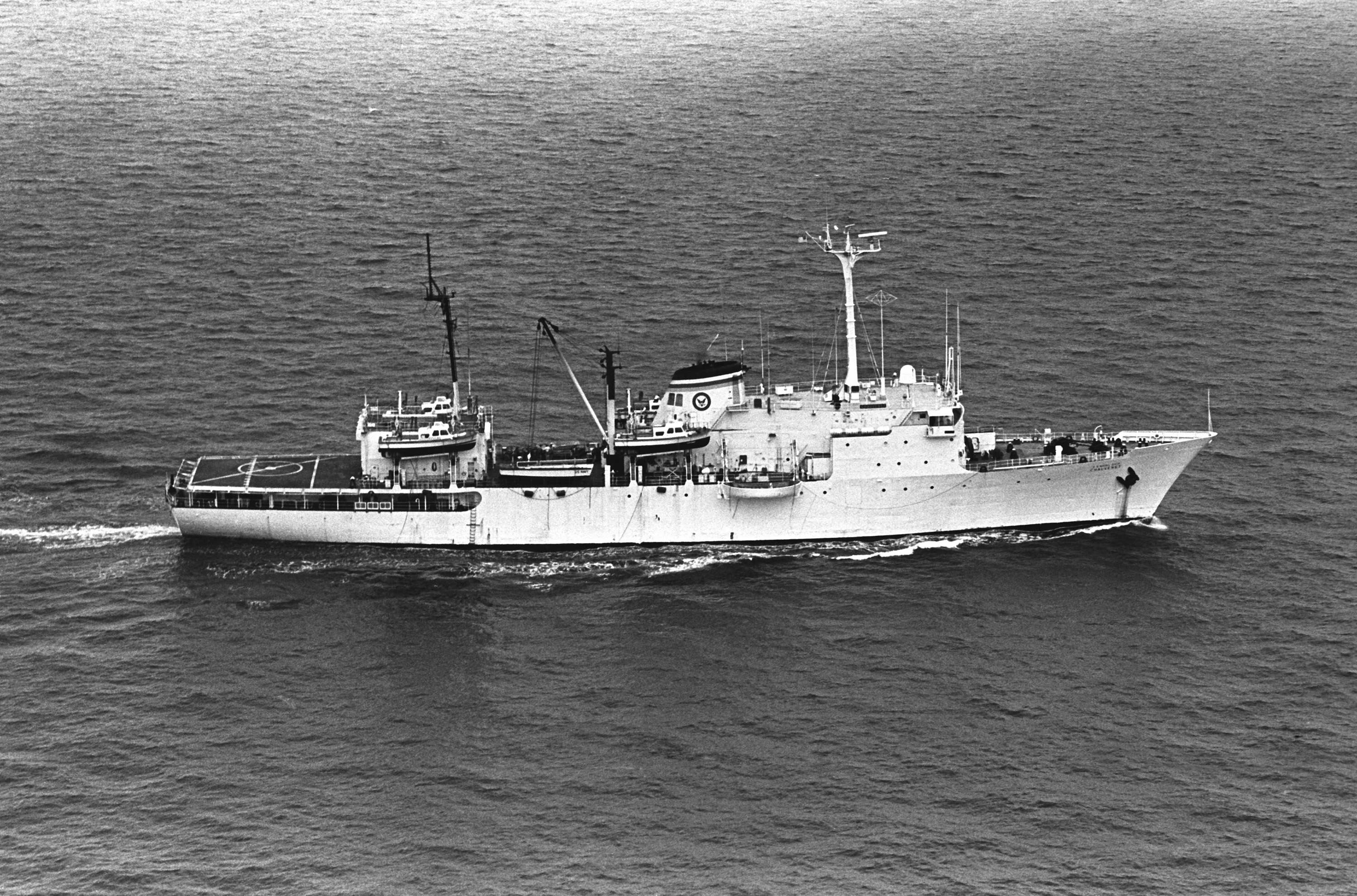
- The U.S. Military Sealift Command surveying ship USNS Chauvenet (T-AGS-29) underway in the Sulu Sea.

History

United States
- Name: Chauvenet (1967 – 1996); Texas Clipper (II) (1996 – 2006); Pacific Collector (2006 – present)
- Ordered: 19 August 1966 (contract award)
- Builder: Upper Clyde Shipbuilding Corp., Glasgow, Scotland
- Laid down: 24 May 1967
- Launched: 13 May 1968
- Acquired: Delivered: 13 November 1970
- Identification: IMO number: 7738474; MMSI number: 367130000; Callsign: KVWA
- Fate: Converted to DOD Missile Defense Agency's Missile Instrumentation Ship MV Pacific Collector
- Status: In Active Service

General characteristics (Note: Reference has data from ship's official Trim and Stability test of 8 January 1972.)
- Class & type: Chauvenet-class hydrographic survey ship
- Tonnage: 2,890 GRT, 1,030 DWT, 4,330 NRT
- Displacement: 3,425 tons light; 4,830 tons full load
- Length: 392 ft 2.25 in (119.5388 m) overall; 357 ft (109 m) LBP
- Beam: 54 ft (16 m) molded; 56 ft (17 m) over bridge wings
- Draft: 16.7 ft (5.1 m) light; 17.75 ft (5.41 m) full load; 1 ft 2 in (0.36 m) sonar dome projection below keel
- Depth: 31 ft (9.45 m) to main deck; 40 ft 1.625 in (12.23 m) molded to 01 level
- Propulsion: 2 Alco diesels, 1,500dw electric drive, 3,600hp Westinghouse motor, 1 screw
- Speed: 15 kn (17 mph; 28 km/h)
- Range: 15,000 nmi (17,000 mi; 28,000 km) at 12 kn (14 mph; 22 km/h); 9,300 nmi (10,700 mi; 17,200 km) at 14 kn (16 mph; 26 km/h); Endurance: 90 days
- Complement: 70 crew, 112 survey complement
- Armament: None

USNS Chauvenet (T-AGS-29) was a multi-function (littoral, coastal and deep ocean) survey ship laid down on 24 May 1967, at Upper Clyde Shipbuilding Corp., Glasgow, Scotland. The ship was the second survey ship, Chauvenet (AGS-11) being the first, named for William Chauvenet (1820–1870). He was instrumental in the founding of the United States Naval Academy at Annapolis, MD. The mathematics department of the US Naval Academy in Annapolis was founded by Chauvenet and is housed in Chauvenet Hall. Chauvenet was launched on 13 May 1968, delivered to the US Navy, 13 November 1970 and placed in service with the Military Sealift Command (MSC) as USNS Chauvenet (T-AGS-29). The ship conducted coastal hydrographic and topographic surveys under the technical direction of the Oceanographer of the Navy through the U.S. Naval Oceanographic Office (NAVOCEANO). The ship was assigned to the Pacific for surveys, sister ship Harkness (T-AGS-32) was assigned Atlantic duties, doing so until inactivated in November 1992.

In February 1996 the Navy turned title to the ship over to the Maritime Administration (MARAD). MARAD had the ship altered to become a 260 berth training ship, Texas Clipper II, for use by Texas A&M University, Galveston, Texas arriving there 30 May 1997 with the first training cruise beginning on 3 June 1997. Training cruises continued until 2005 with the ship entering the agency's Beaumont Reserve Fleet on 26 July. With exception of use in Hurricane Rita relief in October 2005 the ship remained there until taken out for conversion into the Missile Instrumentation Ship Pacific Collector, owned and operated by MARAD for the Department of Defense, Missile Defense Agency.

== Navy coastal surveys ==
Chauvenet was the first Navy vessel specifically designed and built to conduct coastal hydrographic surveys. With sister ship Harkness the two were to replace the World War II transports converted to coastal survey ships Tanner (AGS-15) and Maury (AGS-16). The ship was operated by MSC with a civilian crew under the technical direction of the Oceanographer of the Navy through the U.S. Naval Oceanographic Office (NAVOCEANO). The surveys were conducted by a complement of military and civilian surveyors. The ship embarked four 36 ft (11.0 m) launches, two helicopters, chart production and printing equipment, the Navy/civilian survey detachment and a Navy Sea Bee coastal survey team with landing and shore vehicles. Survey operations, under NAVOCEANO's Hydrographic Surveys Department, were conducted by the United States Navy's (USN) Oceanographic Survey Unit 4 (OCUNIT4). (Note: Oceanographic Survey Unit 5 was embarked in Harkness.) United States Navy units aboard consisted of a helicopter detachment, a detachment of Seabees as well as several other Navy departments supporting survey missions.

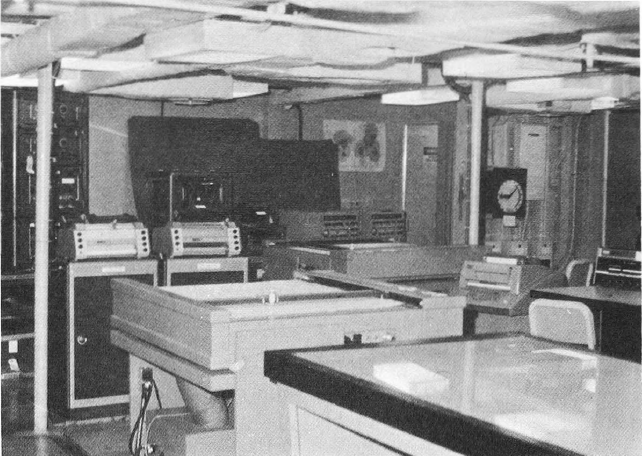
HYDAS Flat-bed Plotter — Survey Control Center, coastal survey ships.

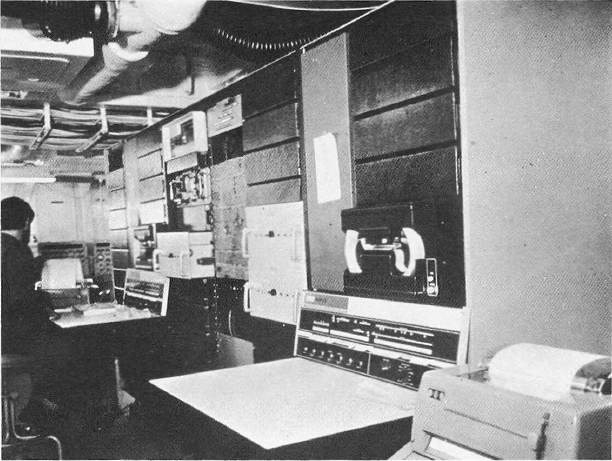
HYDAS PDP-9 Computer Installation, coastal survey ships.

The ship, primarily assigned to the Pacific, (Note: Harkness was assigned to Atlantic surveys.) was equipped with an early shipboard data acquisition and processing system designated the Hydrographic Data Acquisition System (HYDAS) based on the PDP-9 computer. The identical system was installed aboard Harkness. Similar systems were installed on Sgt. George D Keathley (T-AGS-35) and Kellar (T-AGS-25). (Note: The Keathley system was modified for deep water bathymetric survey and later the system was installed aboard Wyman (T-AGS-34).) One computer was dedicated to real time collection of survey data and another to processing the data for making nautical charts or being a backup for the real time data collection in event of failure of that computer. A real time navigation plot was generated on a flatbed plotter. The processing computer processed data collected by the ship and the sounding launches which had an associated data collection system designated HYSURCH for hydrographic survey and charting system. The launches themselves were 36 foot fiber glass, diesel powered, "sports sedans" capable of 30 kn (35 mph; 56 km/h) smooth water speed and modified for survey operation.

By 1972, following shakedown in which test surveys were made in areas of civilian interest the ship was to replace Kellar in such work in the Pacific and begin surveying supporting production of combat charts, special Naval charts at 1:50,000 scale showing hydrography and topography to support fire and air support during amphibious operations.

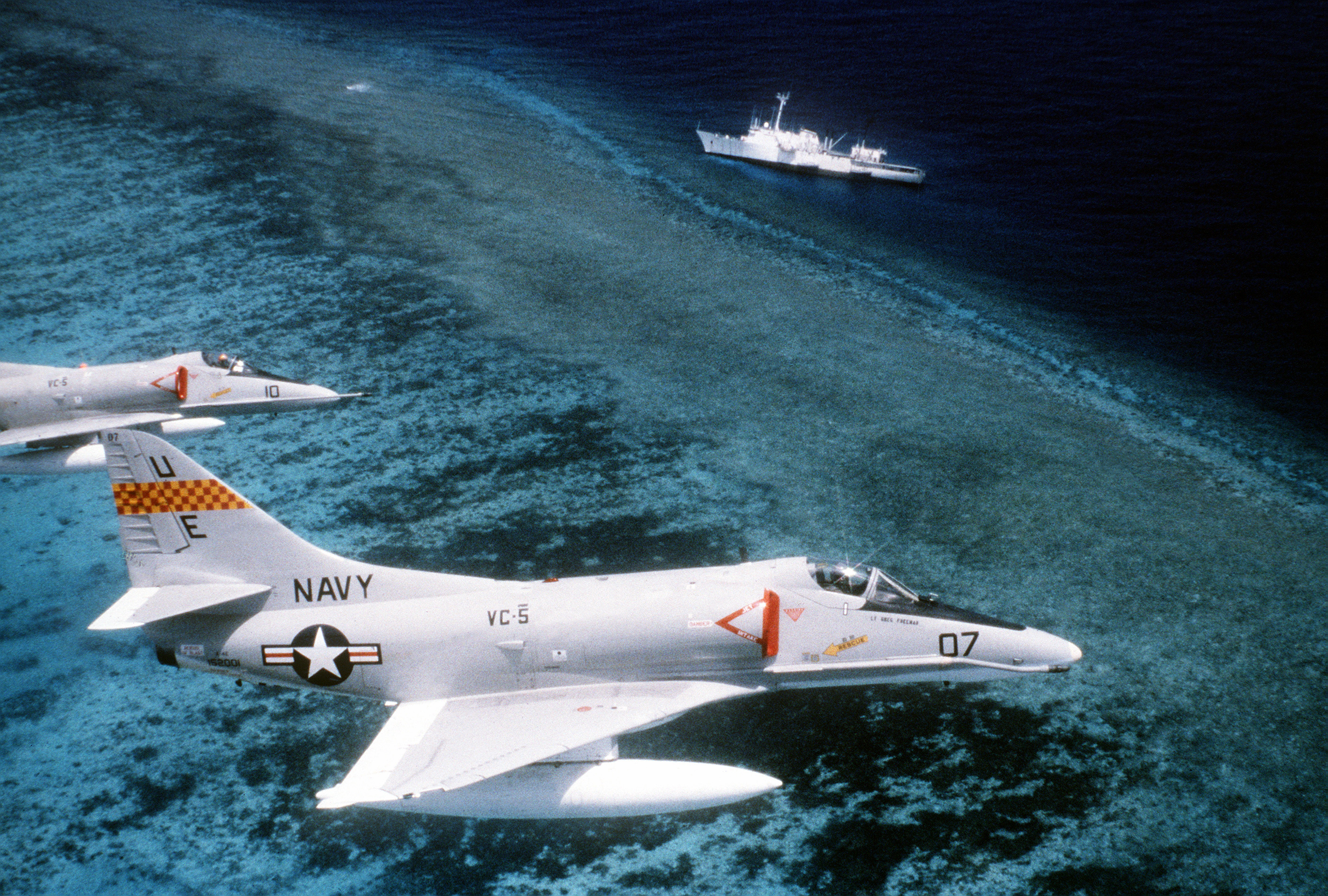
Two Fleet Composite Squadron 5 (VC-5) A-4E Skyhawk aircraft fly over the surveying ship USNS Chauvenet (T-AGS-29). The Chauvenet has run aground on a reef.

Chauvenet grounded two hours before midnight 8 May 1982 on Dauisan Reef (09°47′0″N 121°13′30″W) in the Sulu Sea while transiting from Subic Bay to survey areas in Indonesia. Damage was considerable with flooding of several spaces. Navy salvage operations based aboard Brunswick (ATS-3) over two weeks refloated the ship for temporary repairs at the Ship Repair Facility at Subic before being towed to Sasebo, Japan for permanent repairs.

Chauvenet was inactivated and placed in the Maritime Administration (MARAD) National Defense Reserve Fleet 7 November 1992 with title transferred to MARAD 16 February 1994.

The two large hydrographic survey ships were replaced by the much smaller coastal hydrographic survey ships USNS John McDonnell (T-AGS-51) and USNS Littlehales (T-AGS-52).

== Maritime Administration ==
The Maritime Administration had the ship converted by Stevens Technical Services, Brooklyn, N.Y., into a 260 berth training ship for Texas A&M University, Galveston, Texas named Texas Clipper II. The converted ship began sea trials 28 May 1997 completing those on 30 May. On 3 June 1997 the ship began the first summer cruise as a training ship. Future cruises included visits to Valparaíso, Chile and the Galapagos Islands in the summer of 1998. In 1999 the cruise visited the ports of the Canary Islands and Lisbon, Portugal, Cork, Ireland and Le Havre, France. The following cruises were largely in North American waters until 2002. That summer the ship visited Stavanger, Norway and Aalborg, Denmark. Following cruises were again in North American waters until the last cruise was completed 16 July 2005. On 26 July 2005 the ship entered the agency's Beaumont Reserve Fleet but was reactivated 7 October for Hurricane Rita relief at Lake Charles, Louisiana. During 2006 the ship was converted with the name changed to Pacific Collector for use by the DOD Missile Defense Agency.

== Missile Instrumentation Ship ==
MARAD owns and operates Pacific Collector for the Department of Defense. The ship serves as the DOD Missile Defense Agency's Missile Instrumentation Ship home ported in Portland, Oregon. Along with Pacific Tracker the ship is one of the agency's sea based platforms collecting and recording critical test data. The ship also hosts the Pacific Collector Range Safety System (PCRSS) for positive control over test missile flight termination systems. (Note: Missile Defense Agency Test Resources Directorate Instrumentation Support Contract (Briefing), Page 7, has a recent color photo of the ship.)
