= SS M.I.T. Victory =

Victory ship

- A Typical Victory Ship.

History

United States
- Namesake: Massachusetts Institute of Technology
- Builder: Bethlehem Steel; Fairfield Shipyard, Inc.
- Yard number: 2472
- Laid down: 1945-03-23
- Launched: 1945-05-12
- Christened: 1945-05-12
- Out of service: 1950
- Renamed: USAT Lt. Alexander R. Nininger
- Fate: Sold, 1974, and broken up

General characteristics
- Displacement: 10,750 Tons
- Length: 455 ft (139 m)
- Beam: 62 ft (19 m)
- Draught: 28 fee (8.5 m)
- Propulsion: One cross compound steam turbine; 6,000 hp at 90 rpm
- Speed: 15.5 knots
- Complement: 62 United States Merchant Marine and United States Navy Armed Guard
- Armament: 1 × 5 inch (127 mm) gun (stern); 1 × 3 inch (76 mm) anti-aircraft gun(bow); 8 × Oerlikon 20 mm cannon

The SS M. I. T. Victory was a Victory ship built during World War II and used as a troop transport. She was later named USAT MIT Victory and finally USAT Lt. Alexander R. Nininger. Note: In 1944 there was a different transport ship named Alexander R. Nininger Jr..

== Service life ==
M. I. T. Victory was part of the series of Victory ships named after educational institutions, in this case the Massachusetts Institute of Technology. Her design type was VC2-S-AP2/WSAT. Her Maritime Commission (MCV) hull number was 819 and her shipyard number was 2472. She was a War Shipping Administration Transport (WSAT) designed to carry 1,597 troops.

She was launched and christened on 12 May 1945, shortly after V-E Day. Her sponsor was Mrs. Margaret H. Compton, wife of MIT President Karl T. Compton, who also attended. She was completed on 5 June 1945, 74 days after being laid down.

M. I. T. Victory's library was donated by MIT through the American Merchant Marine Library Association. While bringing back G.I.s from Europe after World War II, the ship published a mimeographed newspaper, Tech Times, for those on board.

One of her more notable passengers was Mary Jane Keeney, a GRU agent involved in the Amerasia Affair. In March 1946, after working with the Allied Staff on Reparations in Europe, Keeney returned on board M. I. T. Victory to New York City. Shortly after arriving the FBI observed her passing an envelope to Joseph Bernstein, which was delivered to Alexander Trachtenberg, a communist party official.

On 30 August 1946, the ship was transferred to the US Army and became U. S. Army Transport (USAT) M.I.T Victory. She made her maiden voyage as an Army Transport from New York to Bremerhaven, Germany, departing on September 13, 1946, carrying troops to Europe. A hurricane was encountered en route and the trip took 13 days.

In 1948 she was renamed to USAT Lt. Alexander R. Nininger, using the Army practice of naming their vessels after Medal of Honor winners.

== Fate ==
On 16 September 1949, she was laid up in the National Defense Reserve Fleet in the Hudson River. The Army transferred title to the Maritime Commission on 8 December 1949. On 31 October 1969 she was transferred to James River, Virginia. On 16 July 1974, she was sold for $555,100 to Sparreboom Shipbrokers for scrapping. At 1030 EDT, on 23 August 1974 she was withdrawn from the Reserve Fleet and sent to the breaker's yard in Rotterdam.

== Artifacts ==
The christening bottle for the M. I. T. Victory is in the MIT Historical Collection. The brass builder's plate was likely removed by MARAD, but has not been cataloged as of this writing.
