= Alexander R. Nininger =

US Army officer, first posthumous recipient of Medal of Honor during World War II

- First Medal of Honor recipient of World War II
- Born: October 20, 1918; Gainesville, Georgia
- Died: January 12, 1942 (aged 23); Abucay, Bataan, Philippine Islands
- Burial place: Arlington National Cemetery cenotaph, Arlington, Virginia
- Military career
- Allegiance: United States of America
- Branch: United States Army
- Service years: 1941–1942
- Rank: Second Lieutenant
- Nickname: "Sandy"
- Units: 1st Battalion, 57th Infantry Regiment (Philippine Scouts)
- Conflicts: World War II
- Awards: Medal of Honor; Bronze Star; Purple Heart with 2 Oak Leaf Clusters

Alexander Ramsey Nininger Jr. (October 20, 1918 – January 12, 1942) was a Second Lieutenant in the US Army assigned to lead a unit of the Philippine Scouts who was killed in action in the Battle of Bataan. He was the first Medal of Honor recipient of World War II after the Attack on Pearl Harbor.

== Biography ==
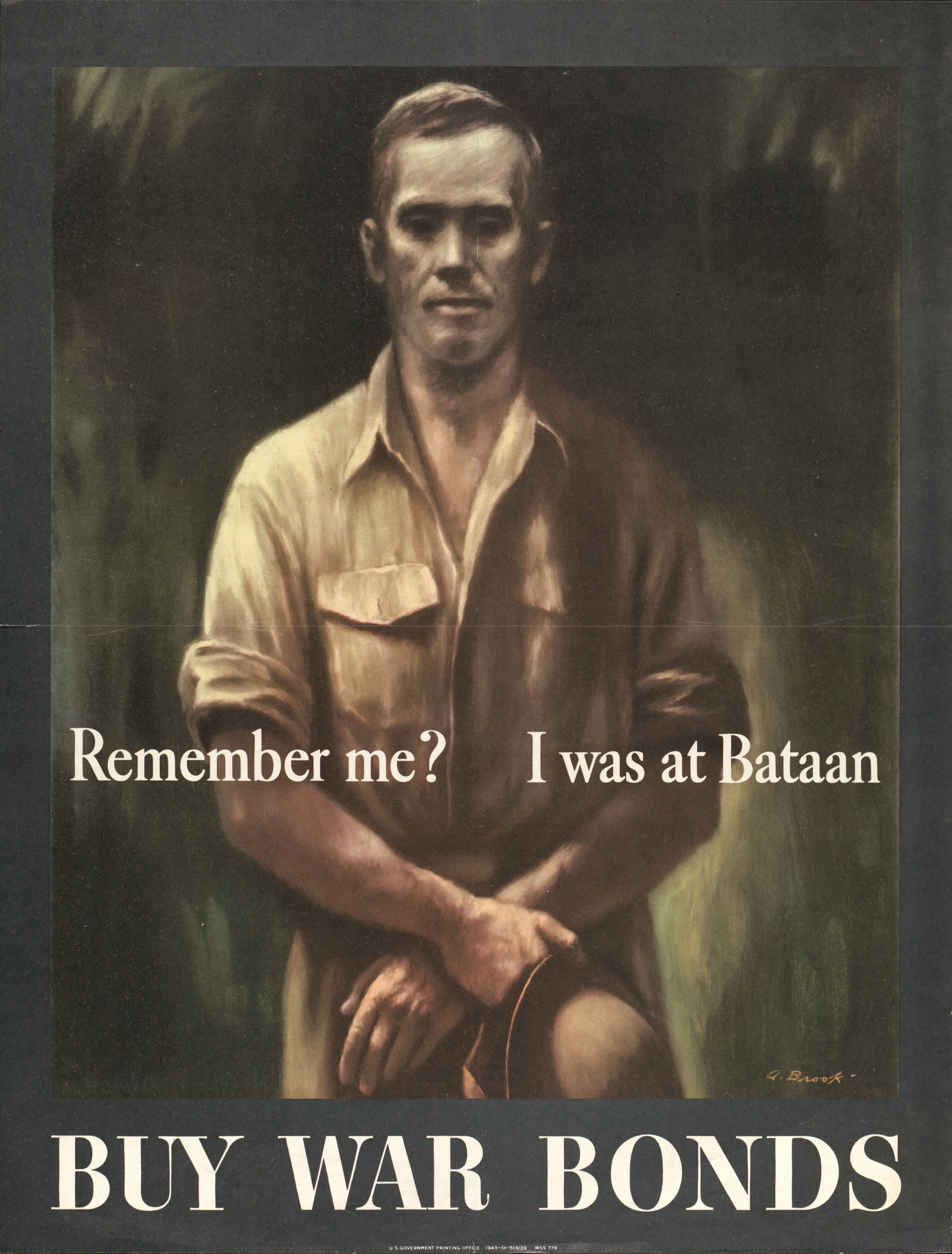
A 1943 war bonds poster by Alexander Brook evoked Nininger's sacrifice in the Battle of Bataan.

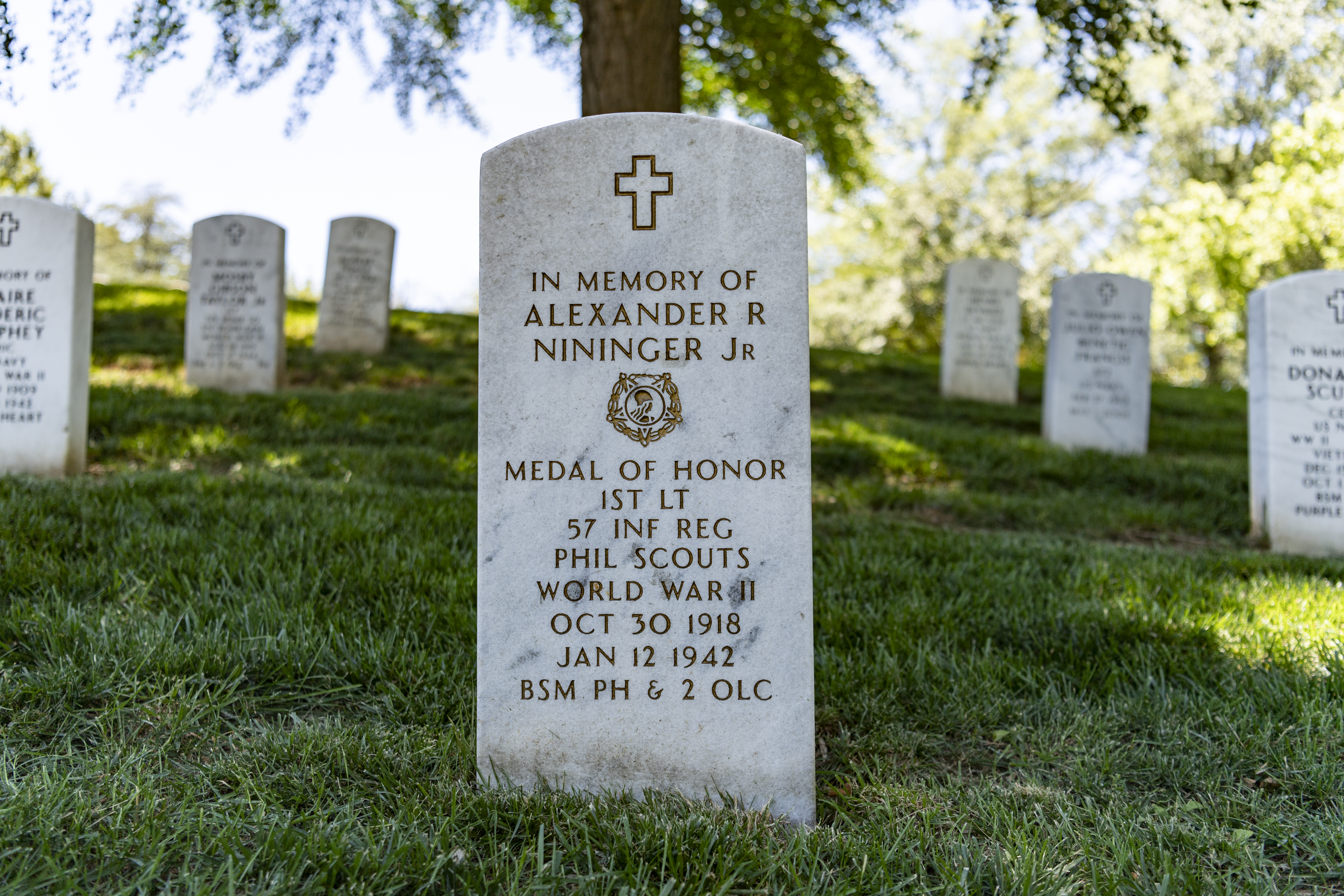
Cenotaph at Arlington National Cemetery

Nininger, nicknamed "Sandy", was born in Gainesville, Georgia, in 1918. He attended the United States Military Academy and graduated in May 1941. At the Academy he was involved in track, the debating society, and was chairman of the lecture committee. He was part of the Academy's 3rd Battalion "L" Company, in which he served as a Cadet Sergeant.

His yearbook biography is as follows:

"—'tis not what man does which exalts him, but what man would do!" It was Sandy's good fortune to be provided with the means and the background necessary to know and appreciate the many arts. His interest in the theatre, a devotion to books and music, and a love for painting make him an excellent conversationalist. Could it be these artistic inclinations that have so often prompted 'Is she pro?' Proof enough isn't it, that Sandy was one of us?

The West Point Class of 1941 Yearbook lists Nininger's hometown as Fort Lauderdale, Florida.

After being commissioned a 2nd Lieutenant Nininger was sent to the Philippines and was attached to the 57th Infantry Regiment (United States) of the Philippine Scouts. According to journalist Malcolm Gladwell, after entering active service, Nininger "wrote a friend to say that he had no feelings of hate, and did not think he could ever kill anyone out of hatred. He had none of the swagger of the natural warrior. He worked hard and had a strong sense of duty." Nininger loved to draw pictures. During the first month of the Japanese invasion of the Philippines, Nininger's unit helped prepare American defenses in Bataan. After the Japanese launched their assault on Bataan, Nininger voluntarily joined another company because his unit was not yet engaged in combat.

One of four unidentified graves at Santo Domingo Parish Church Cemetery, Abucay, Bataan that is possibly Nininger's resting place

Nininger was killed in action near Abucay, Bataan, on January 12, 1942. He was posthumously awarded the Medal of Honor for leading an assault on Japanese positions. He was the first Medal of Honor recipient of World War II after those who were at Pearl Harbor.

== Medal of Honor citation ==
Rank and organization: Second Lieutenant, 57th Infantry, Philippine Scouts, U.S. Army. Place and date: Near Abucay, Bataan, Philippine Islands, January 12, 1942. Entered service at: Fort Lauderdale, Fla. Born: Gainesville, Georgia.

Citation:
For conspicuous gallantry and intrepidity above and beyond the call of duty in action with the enemy near Abucay, Bataan, Philippine Islands, on 12 January 1942. This officer, though assigned to another company not then engaged in combat, voluntarily attached himself to Company K, same regiment, while that unit was being attacked by enemy force superior in firepower. Enemy snipers in trees and foxholes had stopped a counterattack to regain part of position. In hand-to-hand fighting which followed, 2d Lt. Nininger repeatedly forced his way to and into the hostile position. Though exposed to heavy enemy fire, he continued to attack with rifle and hand grenades and succeeded in destroying several enemy groups in foxholes and enemy snipers. Although wounded 3 times, he continued his attacks until he was killed after pushing alone far within the enemy position. When his body was found after recapture of the position, 1 enemy officer and 2 enemy soldiers lay dead around him.

== Awards and decorations ==

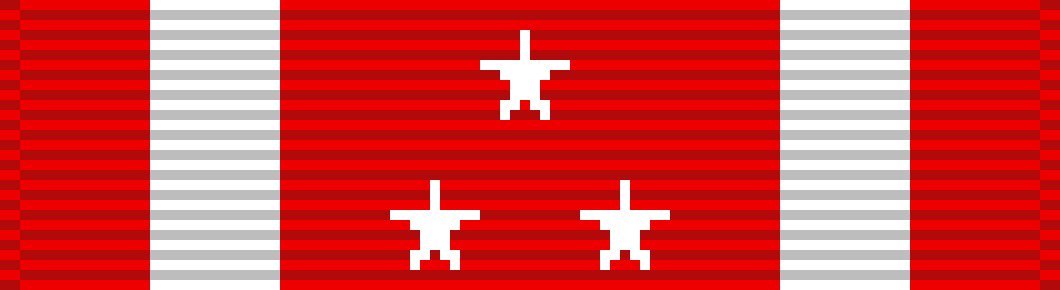

Badge	Combat Infantryman Badge		
1st row	Medal of Honor		Bronze Star Medal
2nd row	Purple Heart with 2 Oak leaf clusters	American Defense Service Medal	American Campaign Medal
3rd row	Asiatic-Pacific Campaign Medal with 1 Campaign star	World War II Victory Medal	Philippine Defense Medal with 1 Campaign star
Unit awards	Presidential Unit Citation		Philippine Presidential Unit Citation

== Further honors and legacy ==
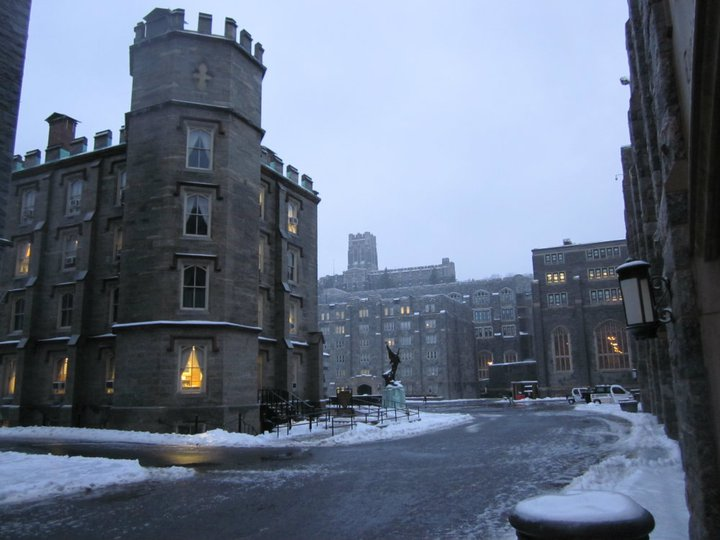
Nininger Hall, located at 747 Thayer Road on the West Point campus

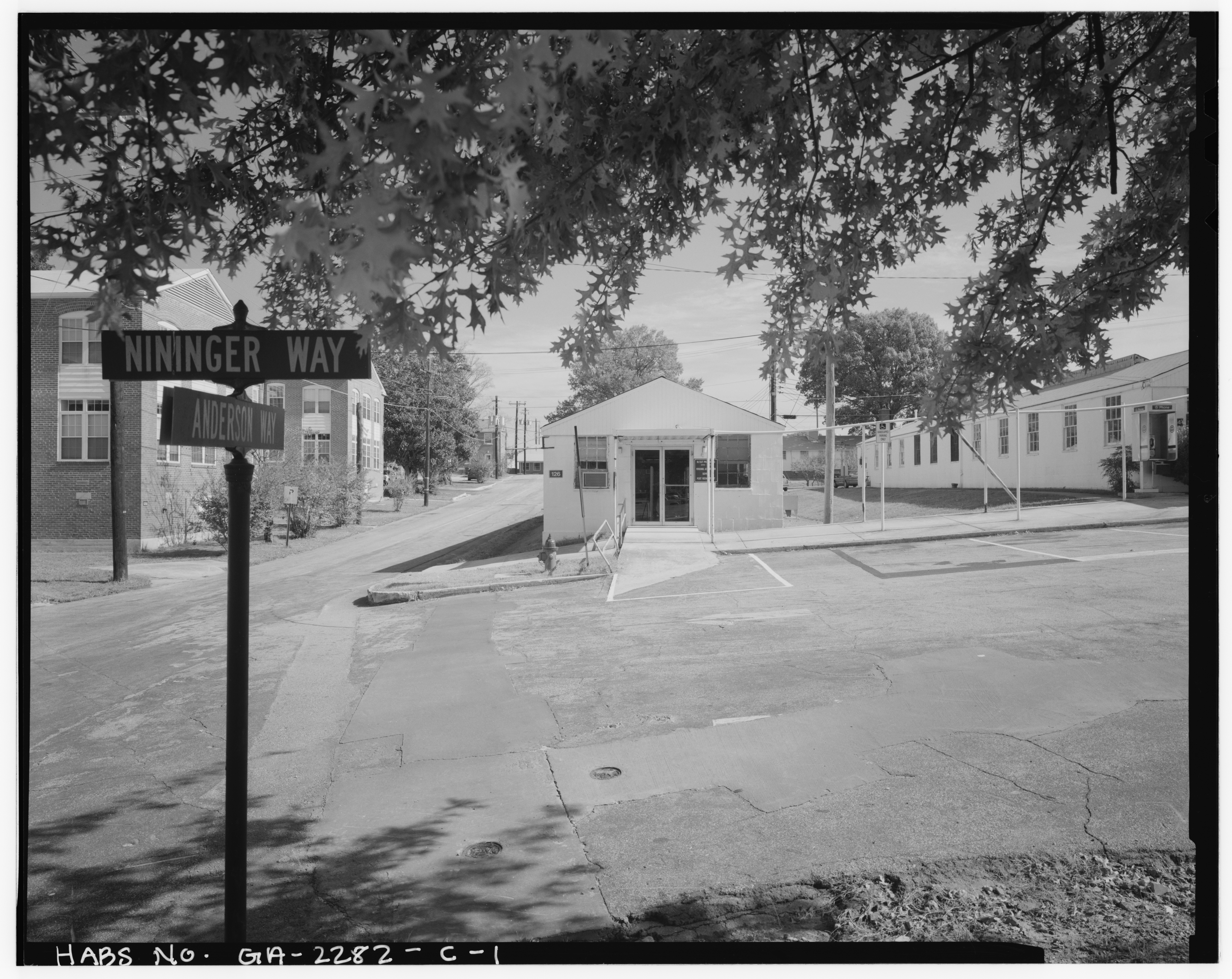
Nininger Way, Fort McPherson, Georgia

Streets were named in Nininger's honor in Fort Lauderdale, Central Valley, New York, and at Fort McPherson in his native Georgia.

The First Division of Cadet Barracks at West Point is named in his honor.

In 2006 an award was created in his honor by the Association of Graduates of the US Military Academy: The Alexander R. Nininger Award for Valor at Arms. It is given to West Point graduates who have displayed courage in combat and upheld the values of West Point. The first awardee was Major Ryan L. Worthan. Two transport ships were named in honor of Nininger:

- T-APC-117 was launched as Alexander R. Nininger, Jr., and later renamed for another Medal of Honor recipient.
- A Victory ship was named USAT Lt. Alexander R. Nininger.

Nininger's hometown of Fort Lauderdale, Florida, erected a statue in his honor.

The U.S. Army Reserve Center in Fort Lauderdale was renamed in his honor.

Alexander Nininger State Veterans Nursing Home is in Pembroke Pines, Florida, near Fort Lauderdale.

A rifle range at the infantry school of Fort Benning is named Nininger Range in his memory.

== See also ==
- List of Medal of Honor recipients
- List of Medal of Honor recipients for World War II
- Battle of Bataan
- Philippine Scouts
- USAT Lt. Alexander R. Nininger
