= Fleet Survey Team =

Echelon V command of the U.S. Navy

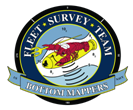
- Fleet Survey Team Logo
- Active: 2005 - 2023
- Disbanded: 25 August, 2023
- Country: United States of America
- Branch: Navy
- Type: Rapid-response team
- Role: Expeditionary hydrography
- Size: Approximately 65 civilian and military personnel
- Part of: Commander, Naval Meteorology and Oceanography Command; Naval Oceanographic Office
- Garrison/HQ: Stennis Space Center

Fleet Survey Team (FST) was an echelon-five command composed of approximately 65 military and civilian members. The command was collocated with the Naval Oceanographic Office and Commander, Naval Meteorology and Oceanography Command, at Stennis Space Center, MS.

Fleet Survey Team was disbanded during a ceremony on 25 August, 2023. The mission of FST was subsequently split between the Naval Oceanographic Office and the Naval Oceanography Mine Warfare Center.

The command enabled combatant commanders with access in the littoral regions through expeditionary hydrography. When forces are armed with detailed descriptions of the environmental conditions they could face, operations have a greater chance of being safely and efficiently executed.

FST gathered the needed information via timely, self-contained hydrographic surveys in response to combatant commanders’ requests. These requests frequently were for areas where Navy operations would take place or where charting accuracy was uncertain.

FST members (both civilian and military) quickly deployed to areas around the world outfitted with equipment to perform surveys from various boats of opportunity. Because of these unique capabilities, civilian and military members of FST have deployed to areas of combat like the Middle East to perform near-shore surveys to collect data which aids in the safe navigation of U.S. forces and supplies traversing the area.

FST members also played significant roles in charting areas affected by natural disasters such as the south Asia tsunami of 2004 and hurricanes Katrina and Rita in the Gulf of Mexico.

Command personnel offer military and civilian knowledge and experience. Enlisted sailors routinely qualify as level two military hydrographers, certifying their skills.

In addition to their strong backgrounds in math, science and engineering, officers and civilians frequently obtain master's degrees in hydrographic science through an ongoing program with The University of Southern Mississippi and are also recognized by the International Hydrographic Office as Category A hydrographers.

Fleet Survey Team command members were commonly known as the Fightin’ Crawdads in reference to the crawfish featured prominently in the FST logo.
