= USNS Bowditch (T-AGS-62) =

Pathfinder-class survey ship

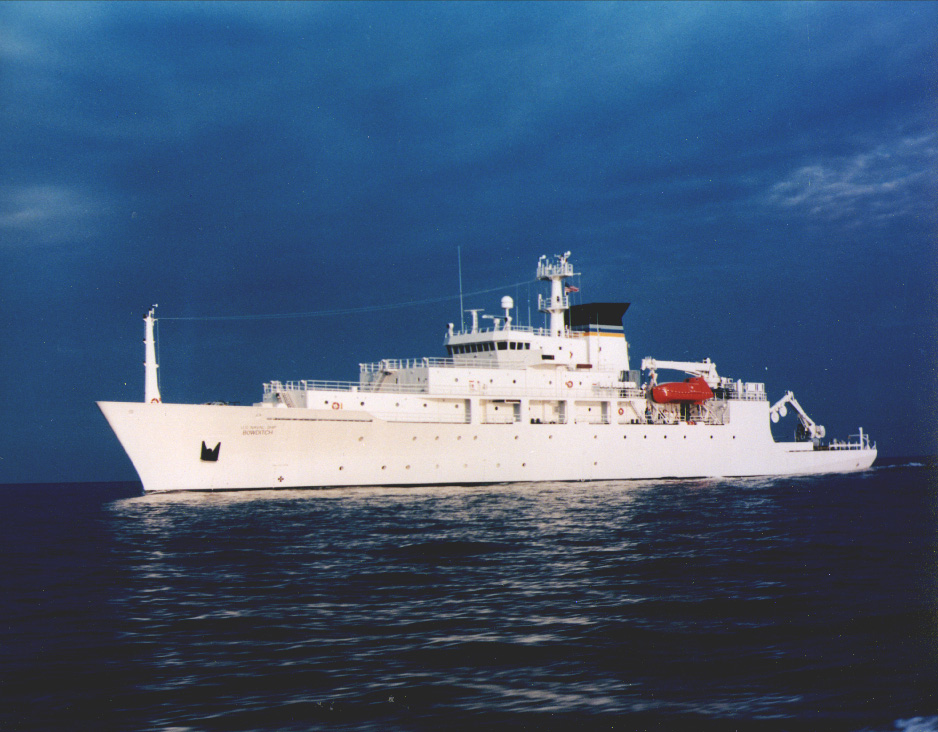
- USNS Bowditch at Sea

History

United States
- Namesake: Nathaniel Bowditch
- Owner: United States Navy
- Operator: Military Sealift Command
- Awarded: 29 May 1992
- Builder: Halter Marine
- Laid down: 16 June 1993
- Launched: 15 October 1994
- In service: 19 July 1996
- Identification: IMO number: 9075216; MMSI number: 367955000; Callsign: NWSW
- Status: in active service

General characteristics
- Class & type: Pathfinder-class survey ship
- Displacement: 4,762 long tons
- Length: 329 ft (100 m)
- Beam: 58 ft (18 m)
- Draft: 19 ft (5.8 m)
- Speed: 16.0 knots (29.6 km/h; 18.4 mph)
- Complement: 26 civilian personnel/27 military sponsor personnel

USNS Bowditch (T-AGS 62) is a Pathfinder-class survey ship. She is the third ship in the class. Bowditch is a part of a 29 ship Special Mission Ship program and operates in the South China Sea. She is named after mathematician Nathaniel Bowditch.

== Incidents ==
On 24 March 2001, Bowditch encountered a PLA Navy frigate, which came within 100 metres (330 ft), while operating in the Yellow Sea near South Korea and was forced to leave. Bowditch later returned with an armed escort.

In March 2001, India protested Bowditch's activities after discovering her operating around 30 nautical miles (56 km; 35 mi) away from the Nicobar Islands. In October 2001, South Korea protested Bowditch's activities after discovering her operating around 26 miles (42 km) off the South Korean coast.

On 24 September 2002, Bowditch was harassed by Chinese patrol boats and aircraft and forced to leave while operating in the Yellow Sea. In May 2003, Bowditch was bumped by a Chinese fishing vessel and suffered damage.

In 2013 Bowditch was engaged in surveying at Tacloban shortly after typhoon Haiyan in advance of the Navy's Operation Damayan in an area known for its shifting hazards to navigation using her multi-beam contour mapping system.

An American Littoral Battlespace Sensing (LBS) or similar underwater glider deployed by Bowditch was seized by a Dalang-III class submarine rescue vessel of the PLA Navy on 15 December 2016, resulting in a formal diplomatic protest.
