= USNS Marie Tharp =

United States Navy Pathfinder-class oceanographic survey ship

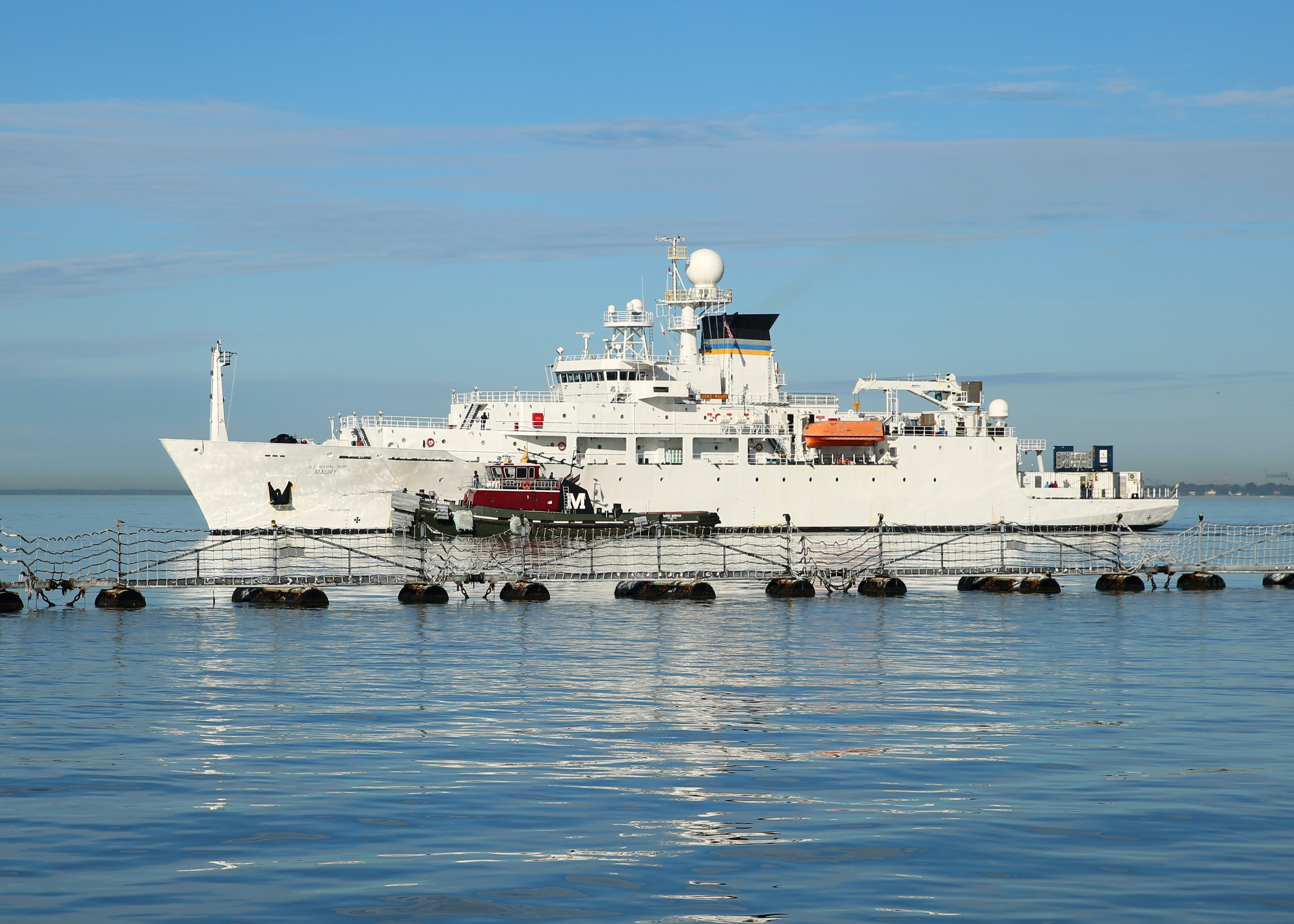
- USNS Maury on 2 November 2017

History

United States
- Name: Maury (2016–2023); Marie Tharp (from 2023)
- Namesake: Matthew Fontaine Maury; Marie Tharp
- Owner: United States Navy
- Operator: Military Sealift Command
- Awarded: 22 December 2009
- Builder: VT Halter Marine
- Laid down: 1 February 2011
- Launched: 27 March 2013
- In service: February 2016
- Identification: IMO number: 9633484; MMSI number: 368880000; Callsign: NMRY
- Status: In Service

General characteristics
- Class & type: Pathfinder-class survey ship
- Displacement: 5,000 tons full 3,019 light
- Length: 353 ft (108 m)
- Beam: 58 ft (18 m)
- Draft: 19 ft (5.8 m)

USNS Marie Tharp (T-AGS-66) is a Pathfinder-class oceanographic survey ship operated by the Military Sealift Command of the United States Navy. The seventh ship in her class, Marie Tharp is named for oceanographer Marie Tharp; the ship was renamed in 2023 from Maury.

The-then Maury's keel was laid on 1 February 2011 in a ceremony at the VT Halter Marine shipyard in Moss Point, Mississippi. The hull was launched on 27 March 2013 and the ship was delivered on 16 February 2016. Maury completed her maiden voyage in June 2016.

== Details ==
Marie Tharp was the first oceanographic survey ship built since USNS Mary Sears was launched in 2000. At approximately 350 feet (110 m), Marie Tharp is 24 feet (7.3 m) longer than her other sister ships in the same class. This modification is to accommodate a 300-square-foot (28 m^{2}) moon pool for unmanned vehicle deployment and retrieval.

== Name change ==
The National Defense Authorization Act for Fiscal Year 2020 created a new Naming Commission to examine names across the US armed forces that honor the Confederate States of America, the group of states that attempted to break away from the US during the American Civil War.

In September 2022, the Naming Commission recommended the renaming of Maury and cruiser USS Chancellorsville, with the new names to be decided by the Secretary of the Navy. Maury was named after military officer and diplomatic envoy Matthew Fontaine Maury, the "Father of Modern Oceanography" who resigned from a 36-year career in the US Navy to accept a command in the Confederate States Navy during the American Civil War.

On 8 March 2023, International Women's Day, the US Navy Secretary, Carlos Del Toro, announced the ship would be renamed in honor of oceanographer Marie Tharp, best known for helping produce the first scientific map of the Atlantic Ocean floor. The renaming was formally completed in the Naval Vessel Register on 13 March 2023.
