= Fleet Weather Center San Diego =

U.S. Office for naval navigation/meteorology

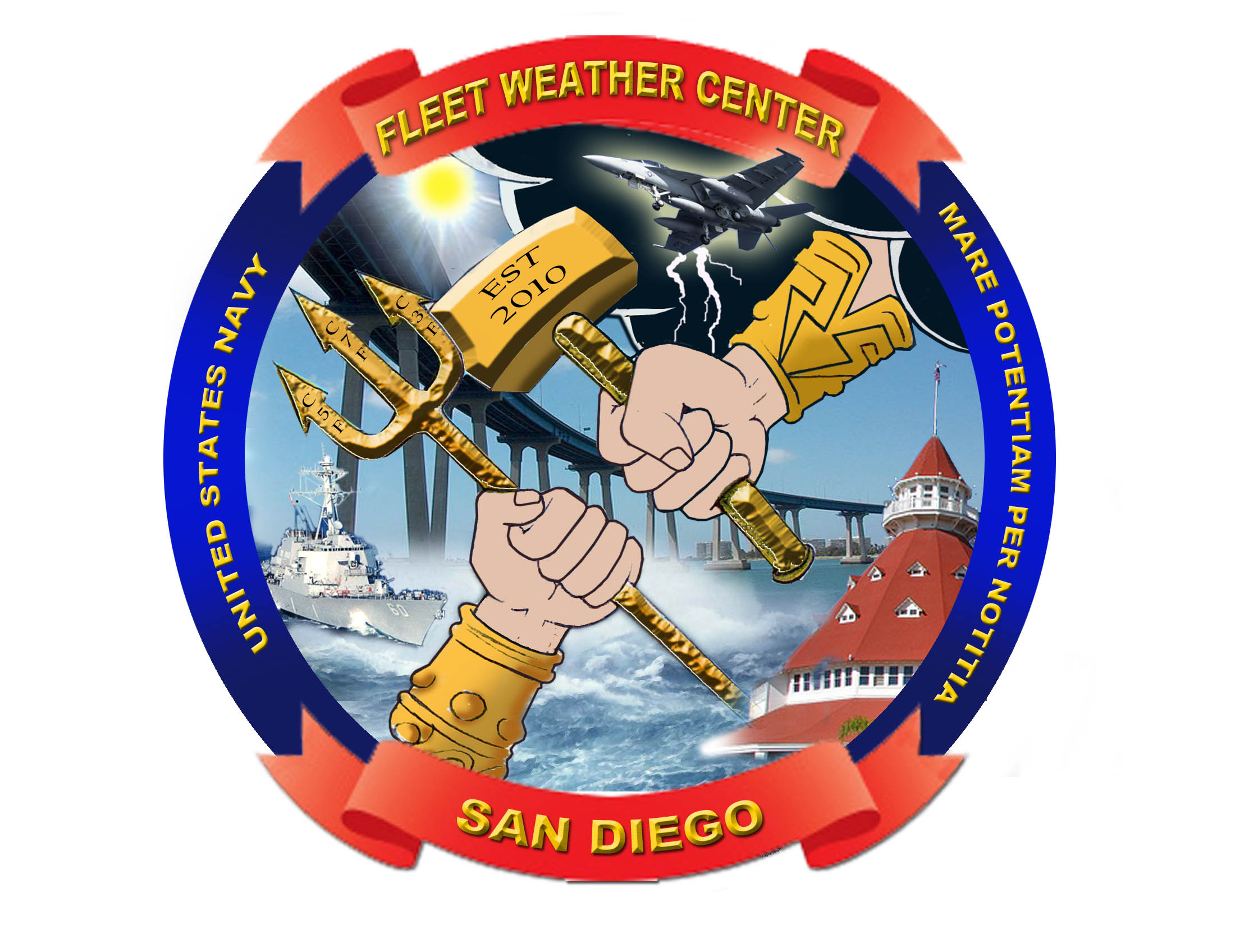

Agency overview
- Formed: 1944
- Jurisdiction: Federal government of the United States
- Headquarters: Building 14, Naval Air Station North Island
- Employees: ac. 400 civilian, military, and contract personnel
- Agency executives: Capt. Kate Hermsdorfer, Commanding officer; Cmdr. Shelley Caplan, Executive officer; AGCM Gene Douglas, Command Master Chief; Mr. Rodney Jacques, Senior Meteorology Officer
- Parent agency: Commander, Naval Meteorology and Oceanography Command (CNMOC)
- Child agencies: Joint Typhoon Warning Center (JTWC); Strike Group Oceanography Team San Diego (SGOT-SD); Naval Oceanography Anti-submarine Warfare Center Yokosuka, Japan (NOAC-Y)
- Website: Official website

Fleet Weather Center San Diego (FWC-SD) is an echelon IV command reporting to Commander Naval Meteorology and Oceanography Command and part of the Information Warfare Community. FWC-SD is located on Naval Air Station North Island in San Diego, California and consists of personnel across the Indo-Pacific who are responsible for delivering meteorology and oceanographic capability to Navy, Joint, and Coalition forces operating in Third, Fifth, and Seventh Fleets.

== History ==
On November 5, 2010, Commander Naval Meteorology and Oceanography Command (CNMOC) established Fleet Weather Center San Diego (FWC-SD). It is an echelon IV command reporting to Commander Naval Meteorology and Oceanography Command and part of the Information Warfare Community. FWC-SD is the ninth name change for the Navy weather operation in San Diego since Navy meteorology was established there in 1944.

The establishment of FWC-SD served to relocate all maritime and aviation services to San Diego and consolidate all weather services provided across the Third, Fifth, and Seventh Fleet Areas of Responsibility (AOR) in order to consolidate weather services for the Pacific and Indian oceans and the Persian Gulf region. The previous three commands that were brought under the FWC-SD roof include:

- Strike Group Oceanography Team San Diego (SGOT-SD)
- Naval Maritime Forecast Center (NMFC), previously located in Pearl Harbor: NMFC held responsibility for general maritime forecasting in the Pacific and for routing ships around hazardous weather.
- Naval Aviation Forecasting Detachment (NAFD) San Diego: NAFD provided forecast weather for fight operations throughout the western United States and the eastern half of the Pacific.

FWC-SD is located on Naval Air Station North Island in San Diego, California. The command occupies historic Building 14 that has been the San Diego home of Navy meteorology and oceanography since 1994. Building 14 celebrated its 100th anniversary in October 2019 and formerly functioned as a medical facility.

== Current operations ==
FWC-SD is the primary operations center for Indo-Pacific weather forecasting, with associated weather offices located in other parts of the region through various Echelon V Commands, Detachments, and Components. FWC-SD comprises approximately 400 civilian, military and contract personnel across the Indo-Pacific. Personnel are responsible for delivering meteorology and oceanographic capability to Navy, Joint, and Coalition forces operating in Third, Fifth and Seventh Fleets. FWC-SD and its Echelon V commands operate other remote detachments and components that generate critical Meteorology and Oceanography (METOC) capability at key locations for the Indo-Pacific region such as Bahrain; Okinawa, Japan; Misawa, Japan; Whidbey Island, WA; and Fallon, NV.

In 2020, in addition to its existing responsibility as "Immediate Superior In Command" (ISIC) of Joint Typhoon Warning Center (JTWC), FWC-SD took over ISIC responsibilities for Naval Oceanography Anti-submarine Warfare Command - Yokosuka (NOAC-Y) and SGOT-SD as it was formalized as an echelon V command.

=== Joint Typhoon Warning Center ===
JTWC was established in 1959 as an echelon V command. It provides tropical cyclone reconnaissance, forecast, warning and decision support services for operational advantage to U.S. government agencies operating in the Pacific and Indian Oceans. JTWC's overall area of responsibility for forecasting or repackaging other agencies' official forecasts covers 89 percent of the world's tropical cyclones. They issue forecasts for track, intensity and wind radii for 34 kn (tropical storm strength), 50 kn (storm force) and 64 kn (typhoon strength) winds up to five days in advance for systems that are greater than 25 kn in the western North Pacific Ocean or 34 kn anywhere else.

JTWC's TC forecasts are used by civilian populations in Guam, Micronesia, and American Samoa as well. In addition to real-time forecasting, the JTWC also collaborates with the worldwide scientific community to adapt research to operations and improve satellite sensing abilities and forecast accuracy. Navy personnel at JTWC also provide tsunami advisory information and recommendations to shore installations and units, as well as impact forecasts for U.S. Pacific Fleet's airborne Intelligence, Surveillance and Reconnaissance and decision support services to U.S. Pacific Command and its subordinate commands. JTWC, which the Navy has operated in conjunction with the U.S. Air Force since 1945, remains in Pearl Harbor. JTWC Aviation Detachment Pearl Harbor provides joint aviation services with the Air Force's 17th Operational Weather Squadron, based at Joint Base Pearl Harbor–Hickam. The partnership with the Air Force is similar to one that has been in place at Sembach, Germany, since 2007.

=== Strike Group Oceanography Team San Diego ===
SGOT-SD is the METOC community's premier sea-going command where sailors and junior officers alike are trained, mentored, and prepared to engage in tactically relevant ways with their embarked ships and their warfare commanders. It is an echelon V command. As the primary source for METOC personnel aboard aircraft carriers, amphibious assault ships, and other independent deployers and overseas exercises in the Indo-Pacific AOR, SGOT-SD's mission is to generate and deploy multi-spectrum METOC teams to Navy, Joint and Coalition Forces operating in the Third, Fifth and Seventh Fleet areas of responsibility. SGOT-SD's expanded mission set enables the teams to work directly with afloat commanders across all warfare areas, applying actionable environmental information to improve the Fleet's overall battlespace awareness. SGOT-SD forecasters and observers deploy with aircraft carriers, amphibious ships, and independent deployers to provide on-scene "organic" maritime forecasting as well as anti-submarine warfare (ASW), electromagnetic warfare, and general safety of flight forecasts for the embarked air wings.

=== Naval Oceanography Anti-submarine Warfare Command - Yokosuka ===
NOAC-Y is the final Echelon V command operating under FWC-SD. Forecasters from NOAC-Y deliver METOC presence forward-deployed deliver asymmetric warfighting advantage for ASW forces in Seventh and Fifth Fleets through the application of oceanographic sciences; and accurate and timely weather forecasts, warnings, and recommendations for COMNAVFORJAPAN ashore forces to facilitate asset protection responsibilities and risk management decisions.

== Capability ==
Fleet Weather Center San Diego operates a 24/7/365 watchfloor famous for its Optimum Track Ship Routing (OTSR) delivery spearheaded by a civilian and military ship routing officers. Publicly available METOC capability is disseminated via Fleet Weather Center San Diego CA.

== Related operations ==
Fleet Weather Center San Diego's sister station, Fleet Weather Center Norfolk, is the home of Navy weather forecasting for the Second, Fourth and Sixth Fleet areas of responsibility.

== Commanding officer history ==
- 2010 CAPT Todd Monroe
- 2012 CAPT Greg Ulses
- 2014 CAPT Pete Smith
- 2016 CAPT Michael Roth
- 2018 CAPT Rachael Dempsey
- 2020 CAPT Shane Stoughton
- 2022 CAPT Kate Hermsdorfer
- 2024 CAPT Erin Ceschini
