= USNS Bruce C. Heezen =

Survey ship launched in 1999

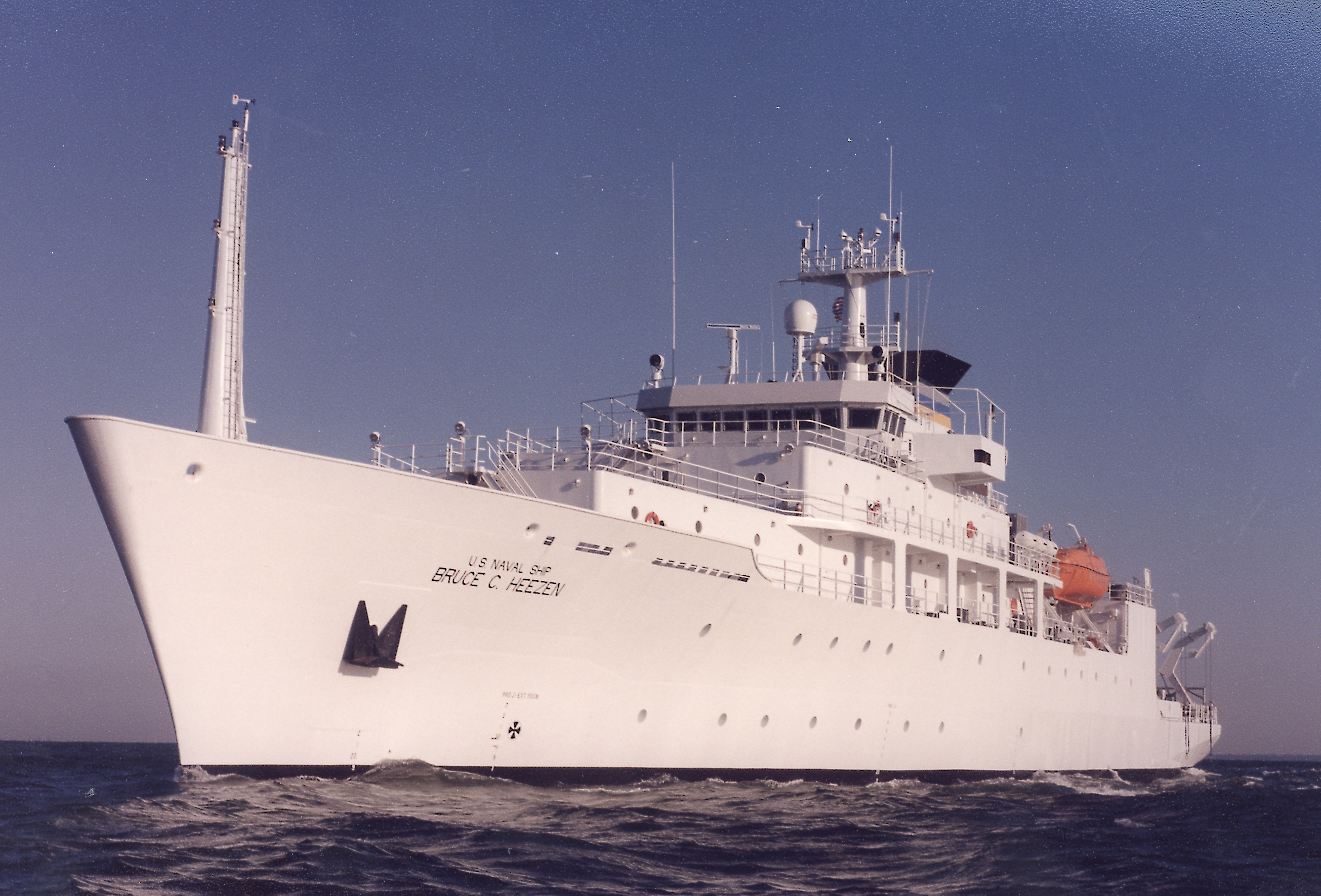
- USNS Bruce C. Heezen

History

United States
- Namesake: Bruce C. Heezen
- Owner: United States Navy
- Operator: Military Sealift Command
- Awarded: 13 January 1997
- Builder: Halter Marine
- Laid down: 19 August 1997
- Launched: 25 March 1999
- In service: 13 January 2000
- Identification: IMO number: 9117272; MMSI number: 338934000; Callsign: NBID
- Status: in active service

General characteristics
- Class & type: Pathfinder-class survey ship
- Displacement: 5,000 long tons
- Length: 329 ft (100 m)
- Beam: 58 ft (18 m)
- Draft: 19 ft (5.8 m)
- Speed: 16 kn (30 km/h)
- Complement: 26 mariners/27 sponsor personnel

USNS Bruce C. Heezen (T-AGS 64) is a Pathfinder-class oceanographic survey ship. It is the fifth ship in the class.

== Naming ==
She is named after Bruce C. Heezen, who was the leader of the team from Columbia University that discovered the Mid-Atlantic Ridge during the 1950s. The ship was the first Navy vessel to be named by civilians. Nine students from Oaklawn Elementary School in Cranston, RI named the ship after winning a contest sponsored by the Navy. Amanda Baillargeon, James Coogan, Meagan Durigan, Stephen Fish, Patricia Gumbley, John Lucier, Sara Piccirilli, Dana Scott, and Rebecca Webber were led by their teacher Marilyn Remick.
