= Naval Oceanographic Office =

U.S. government office preparing and publishing information used in navigation

- Logo of Naval Oceanographic Office

Agency overview
- Formed: 1962
- Preceding agencies: United States Hydrographic Office; U.S. Naval Observatory and Hydrographical Office; Depot of Charts and Instruments
- Jurisdiction: Federal government of the United States
- Headquarters: John C. Stennis Space Center, Mississippi
- Employees: approximately 1,000 civilian, military, and contract personnel
- Agency executives: Rear Admiral Ron Piret, Commanding officer; CAPT Ivo Prikasky, Executive officer; Rodney "Wade" Ladner, Technical director; AGCM Chad Goff, Senior enlisted advisor
- Parent agency: Commander, Naval Meteorology and Oceanography Command (CNMOC)
- Child agencies: Fleet Survey Team (FST); Naval Ice Center (NAVICE)
- Website: oceanography.navy.mil

The Naval Oceanographic Office (NAVOCEANO), located at John C. Stennis Space Center in south Mississippi, is an echelon IV component of the Naval Meteorology and Oceanography Command (CNMOC) and comprises approximately 1,000 civilian, military and contract personnel responsible for providing oceanographic products and services to all elements within the Department of Defense.

== History ==
The Royal Navy created the post of Hydrographer of the Navy in 1795, which within five years was producing naval charts for naval and merchant use. In 1830, the U.S. Navy established the Depot of Charts and Instruments maintain a supply of navigational instruments and nautical charts for issue to naval vessels. It soon became apparent that the Depot would be unable to obtain and maintain an adequate supply of the latest data unless it undertook production of charts from its own surveys. In 1837, the first survey sponsored by the Depot and led by Lieutenant Charles Wilkes resulted in four engraved charts published for use by the U.S. Navy.

Lieutenant Wilkes continued his surveying and gained fame as leader of the U.S. Exploring Expedition. The expedition ranged over the eastern Atlantic to Antarctica, the coasts of both Americas, and far into the west and southwest Pacific. It began the U.S. collection of world magnetic data and contributed substantially to hydrographic, meteorological, botanical and geological knowledge of the explored regions.

During the succeeding five years, 87 similar charts were published and issued from the results of surveys by Wilkes and his officers. These individual surveys, however, were limited in scope; the Depot needed a way to gather information quickly on a worldwide basis. Naval officer Matthew Fontaine Maury, who became known as "The Pathfinder of the Seas", supplied the answer to this dilemma.

Commander Maury, who held the position of Hydrographer of the Navy from 1842 to 1861, is credited with founding the science of oceanography. His system for collecting and using oceanographic data revolutionized navigation of the seas. Maury assumed command of the Navy's Depot of Charts and Instruments in 1842. Possessing an active, scientific mind, he immediately recognized possibilities for expanding the services of the Depot. Following the example of the Royal Navy's Hydrographer of the Navy, he suggested that, if all U.S. shipmasters would submit reports of their experiences to a central agency, the data could be digested, compiled and published for the benefit of all.

Within five years, 26 million reports poured into the Depot, which originally had been intended only as a storehouse of charts and instruments. In 1854, the agency was given the official name of The U.S. Naval Observatory and Hydrographical Office. In 1866, an Act of Congress separated the two functions, establishing the Hydrographic Office as a distinct activity. By this time the Office's mission had expanded to include "the carrying out of surveys, the collection of information and the printing of every kind of nautical chart or publication." The Office continued to grow throughout the nineteenth century.

By the turn of the century, pleasure cruises had become a popular form of vacationing, and suddenly the attention of the world was drawn to a new danger to navigation – ice. The collision of the Titanic with an iceberg in 1912 prompted the Hydrographic Office to urge that an ice patrol be established to document sea-ice hazards to prevent such disasters. This was the beginning of today's sophisticated, high-tech methods of surveying, measuring and recording ice thickness, ice-ridge profiles and other characteristics to monitor ocean-ice conditions above and below the surface.

Because features and conditions of the world's oceans are constantly changing, surveying, charting and mapping must be continuous processes. Experiences during World War I showed the need for greater accuracy for oceanographic data. By 1922, responding to these needs, the Navy had developed the first practical sonic sounding machine, making it possible to surpass all previous efforts in deep-sea sounding and bathymetric charting. Aerial photography was used for the first time that year.

Following the attack on Pearl Harbor, the demands for charts increased to about 40 times the normal pre-war rate. The Hydrographic Office was moved to more adequate facilities at Suitland, Maryland, about 6 miles (10 km) from the nation's Capitol building, and was placed under the cognizance of the Chief of Naval Operations to focus activities directly to programs of national security. Additional survey vessels were obtained, each equipped to conduct surveys and to produce printed charts aboard ship in a minimum of time to keep up with fleet advances across the Pacific. At the peak of World War II, 43 million charts were printed and issued in one year.

The Hydrographic Office was redesignated U.S. Naval Oceanographic Office (NAVOCEANO) in 1962, and in 1976 the Office was relocated to the National Space Technology Laboratory (NSTL), which is now known as the John C. Stennis Space Center, in south Mississippi.

== Organization ==
NAVOCEANO oversees the Naval Ice Center in Suitland, Maryland. Before disbanding, NAVOCEANO also oversaw the Fleet Survey Team at Stennis Space Center, Mississippi.

NAVOCEANO is the largest subordinate command under the Commander, Naval Meteorology and Oceanography Command, which is also located at Stennis Space Center.

== Ships ==
NAVOCEANO's seven oceanographic ships are operated by the Military Sealift Command. The oceanographic survey ships have no homeport and are forward-deployed, surveying the ocean 365 days every year. To avoid interrupting continuous operations, oceanographers from NAVOCEANO relieve their fellow surveyors by flying to locations around the world to meet the ship.

=== T-AGS 60 Class ===
NAVOCEANO has operational control of six T-AGS 60 class ships: Pathfinder (T-AGS-60), Bowditch (T-AGS-62), Henson (T-AGS-63), Bruce C. Heezen (T-AGS-64), Marie Tharp (T-AGS-66) (formerly USNS Maury), and Mary Sears (T-AGS-65), with a seventh (T-AGS-67) currently under construction.

The T-AGS 60 class ships were designed and constructed to provide multipurpose oceanographic capabilities in coastal and deep-ocean areas for NAVOCEANO.

On board, surveyors are equipped to conduct physical, chemical and biological oceanographic operations; multidisciplinary environmental investigations; ocean engineering and marine acoustics; marine geology and geophysics; and bathymetric, gravimetric and magnetometric surveying.

Typical missions of the 329-foot-long (100 m) T-AGS 60 vessels may include oceanographic sampling and data collection of surface water, mid-water and ocean floor parameters; the launch and recovery of small boats known as hydrographic survey launches (HSLs); the launching, recovering and towing of scientific packages (both tethered and autonomous) including the handling, monitoring and servicing of remotely operated vehicles (ROVs); shipboard oceanographic data processing and sample analysis; and precise navigation, trackline maneuvering and station-keeping to support deep-ocean and coastal surveys.

=== T-AGS 50 Class ===
NAVOCEANO formerly operated two coastal hydrographic T-AGS 50 class ship, John McDonnell (T-AGS-51), and Littlehales (T-AGS-52). At a length of 208 feet, both ships were slightly smaller than the T-AGS 60 class ships. Both were capable of collecting hydrographic data on all headings in seas with wave heights up to 9 feet and could launch and recover two HSLs and other survey equipment in seas up to 4 feet. McDonnell was decommissioned on 25 August 2010. Littlehales was transferred to the National Oceanic and Atmospheric Administration (NOAA) on 3 March 2003. She was commissioned into the NOAA Atlantic Fleet as NOAAS Thomas Jefferson (S 222) on 8 July 2003.

== See also ==
- Fathom
