= USNS Mary Sears =

Research vessel launched in 2001

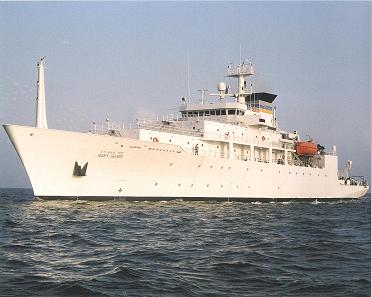
- USNS Mary Sears

History

United States
- Name: Mary Sears
- Namesake: Mary Sears
- Owner: United States Navy
- Operator: Military Sealift Command
- Awarded: 21 December 1998
- Builder: Halter Marine
- Laid down: 28 July 1999
- Launched: 19 October 2000
- In service: 17 December 2001
- Identification: IMO number: 9207077; MMSI number: 303859000; Callsign: NRFR
- Status: in active service

General characteristics
- Class & type: Pathfinder-class survey ship
- Displacement: 5,000 long tons
- Length: 329 ft (100 m)
- Beam: 58 ft (18 m)
- Draft: 19 ft (5.8 m)
- Speed: 16 kn (30 km/h)
- Complement: 26 mariners/27 sponsor personnel

USNS Mary Sears (T-AGS 65) is a Pathfinder-class oceanographic survey ship. It is the sixth ship of its class. Mary Sears is named after Commander Mary Sears of the United States Naval Reserve, who was instrumental in the development of the Woods Hole Oceanographic Institution and is regarded as one of the initial oceanographers in the United States Navy.

The ship has sonar, underwater metal detection and satellite imagery capabilities.

In mid January 2007, Mary Sears deployed to Sulawesi, Indonesia to aid in the search for the missing Adam Air Flight 574. On 24 January 2007, it was reported by the U.S. Embassy in Jakarta that Mary Sears reported detecting pinger signals, at a depth of 1,700 metres (5,600 ft) on the same frequency as those of the lost aircraft's cockpit voice recorder, located in the area where the aircraft is believed to have gone down. Mary Sears had also detected "heavy debris scattered over a wide area".
