= Naval Meteorology and Oceanography Command =

Operational arm of the US Naval Oceanography Program

Coordinates: 30.3720°N 89.6136°W

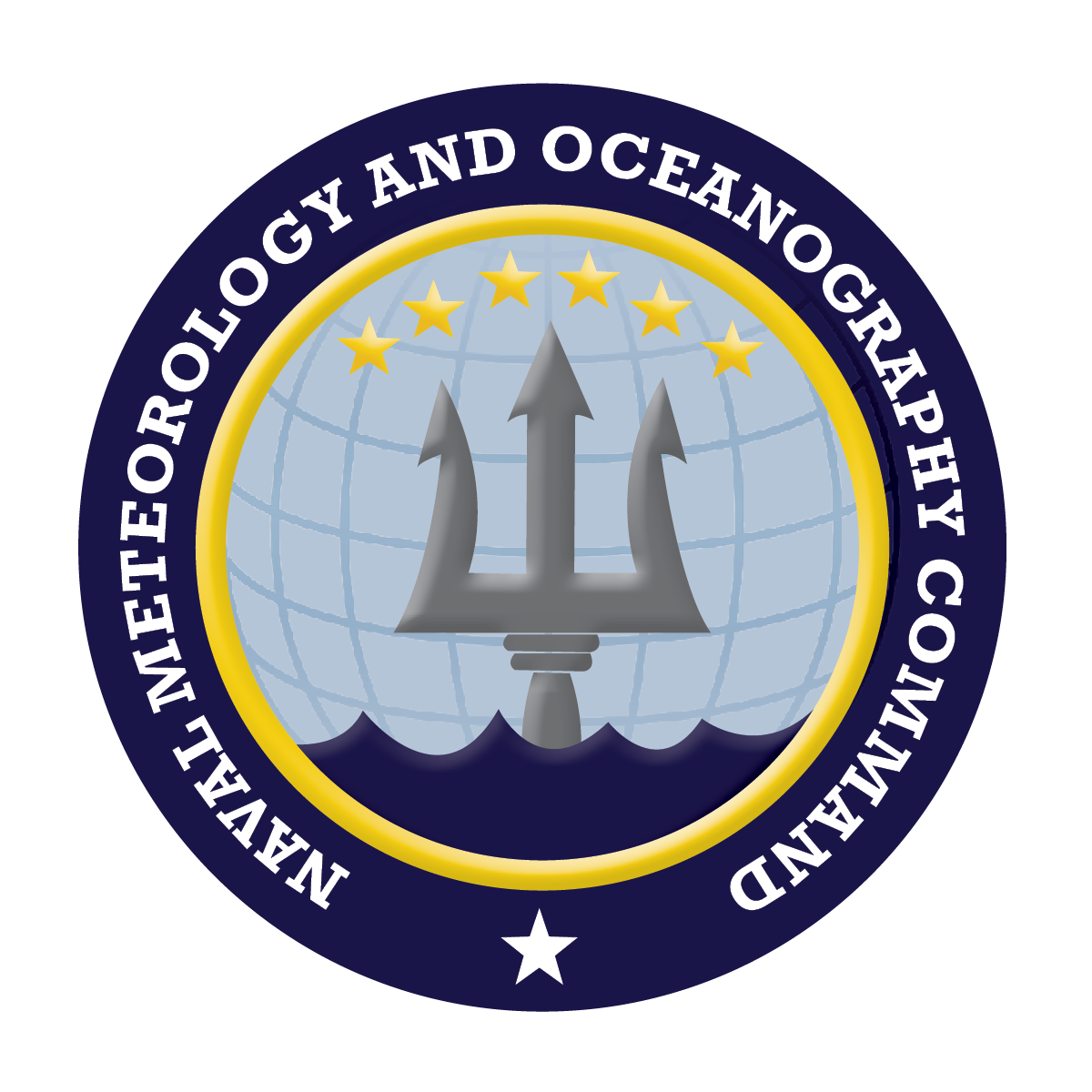
- Active: 1830 – present
- Country: United States
- Branch: United States Navy
- Type: Shore Establishment
- Website: Homepage

Commanders
- Commanding officer: RDML Erin Acosta
- Deputy/Technical Director: Joe Calantoni
- Chief of Staff: CAPT Helen Quilenderino
- Command Master Chief: AGCM Anthony J. Mizzulo

The Naval Meteorology and Oceanography Command (COMNAVMETOCCOM) or CNMOC, serves as the operational arm of the Naval Oceanography Program for the United States Navy. Headquartered at the Stennis Space Center in Mississippi, CNMOC is an echelon three command reporting to United States Fleet Forces Command (USFLTFORCOM). CNMOC's area of responsibility is globally distributed, with assets on larger ships (aircraft carriers, amphibious ships, and command and control ships), shore facilities at fleet concentration areas, and larger production centers in the US.

CNMOC is focused on providing critical environmental knowledge to the war fighting disciplines of Anti-Submarine Warfare, Naval Special Warfare, Mine Warfare, Intelligence, Surveillance and Reconnaissance, and Fleet Operations (Strike and Expeditionary), as well as to the support areas of Maritime Operations, Aviation Operations, Navigation, Precise Time, and Astrometry.

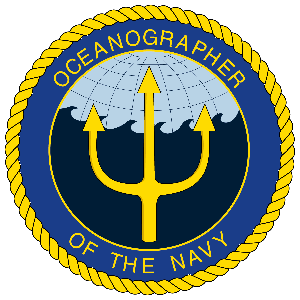
Oceanographer of the Navy seal

The Commanding Officer serves dual hatted as the Oceanographer of the Navy who works closely with the staff of CNMOC to ensure the proper resources are available to meet its mission, to act as a liaison between CNMOC and the chief of naval operations, and to represent the Naval Oceanography Program in interagency and international forums.

== Mission ==
Responsible for command and management of the Naval Oceanography Program, utilizing meteorology and oceanography, GI&S, and precise time and astrometry, to leverage the environment to enable successful strategic, tactical and operational battle space utilization across the continuum of campaigning and at all levels of war – strategic, operational and tactical.

== History ==
It traces its ancestry to the Depot of Charts and Instruments, a nineteenth-century repository for nautical charts and navigational equipment. In the 1840s, its superintendent, Lieutenant Matthew Fontaine Maury, created and published a revolutionary series of ocean current and wind charts. This information, still used in modern computer models of the ocean basins and atmosphere, laid the foundation for the sciences of oceanography and meteorology.

Atmospheric science was further developed with the birth of naval aviation early in the twentieth century. During World War I and the following decades, naval areological specialists applied the fledgling concepts of air masses and fronts to warfare, and provided forecasts to the first transatlantic flight.

The Navy's weather and ocean programs contributed greatly to Allied victory in World War II. In the Pacific, Navy forecasters cracked the Japanese weather code. Hydrographic survey ships, often under enemy fire, collected data along foreign coastlines for the creation of critical navigation charts.

In the mid-1970s, the Navy's meteorology and oceanography programs were integrated in a single organization reflecting nature's close interaction of sea and air. This structure is today the Naval Meteorology and Oceanography Command.

On November 1, 2017, Rear Admiral John A. Okon relieved Rear Admiral Timothy C. Gallaudet as commander. On June 25, 2021, Rear Admiral Ronald J. Piret assumed command from Rear Admiral Okon. On August 15, 2025, Rear Admiral Erin O. Acosta assumed command from Rear Admiral Piret.

List of Commanders of Naval Meteorology and Oceanography Command:

NAME	START
Rear Admiral Timothy C. Gallaudet	June 1, 2014
Rear Admiral John A. Okon	November 1, 2017
Rear Admiral Ronald J. Piret	June 25, 2021
Rear Admiral Erin O. Acosta	August 15, 2025

== Organization ==
It is a third echelon operational command reporting to Fleet Forces Command. The Command's personnel are at its headquarters at the John C. Stennis Space Center near Bay St. Louis, Mississippi, and at several field activities around the world.

Effective October 1, 2014, the Command's major subordinate activities fourth echelon commands include the Naval Oceanographic Office, at Stennis Space Center Mississippi; Fleet Numerical Meteorology and Oceanography Center, in Monterey, California; the Naval Observatory, in Washington, D.C.; the Naval Oceanography Operations Command, at Stennis Space Center, Mississippi; the Fleet Weather Center Norfolk, in Norfolk, Virginia; and Fleet Weather Center San Diego, in San Diego, California. The Naval Meteorology and Oceanography Professional Development Center in Gulfport, Mississippi has been renamed Information Warfare Training Group Gulfport. All Commands have been administratively realigned to Naval Information Forces, Suffolk, Virginia. Operational control of Navy Oceanography forces remains aligned to Naval Meteorology and Oceanography Command.

Furthermore, effective October 1, 2014, the Command realigned its fifth echelon commands. The Naval Ice Center, in Suitland, Maryland aligned underneath the Fleet Weather Center Norfolk; The Joint Typhoon Warning Center, in Pearl Harbor, Hawaii aligned underneath Fleet Weather Center San Diego; The Fleet Survey Team, at Stennis Space Center, Mississippi aligned underneath the Naval Oceanographic Office; Naval Oceanography Anti-Submarine Warfare Center - Stennis Space Center, Mississippi, Naval Oceanography Mine Warfare Center - Stennis Space Center, Mississippi, and Naval Oceanography Special Warfare Center - San Diego, California who all align underneath The Naval Oceanography Operations Command; In 2020 Naval Oceanography Anti-Submarine Warfare Center - Yokosuka, Japan, re-aligned under Fleet Weather Center San Diego. In 2020, Strike Group Oceanography Teams were established in San Diego and then Norfolk aligned under the respective Fleet Weather Centers. It services to five of the Navy's war fighting disciplines:

- Anti-Submarine Warfare;
- Special Warfare;
- Mine Warfare;
- Intelligence, Surveillance and Reconnaissance;
- and Fleet Operations (Strike and Expeditionary)

It also supports Navigation, Precise Time and Astrometry, Maritime Operations and Aviation Operations.

== 2020 realignment ==
In fall 2020, Echelon 4 and 5 commands were again realigned to reflect the following: Fleet Weather Center San Diego now is ISC to Strike Group Oceanography Team San Diego, Naval Oceanography Anti-Submarine Warfare Center Yokosuka, Fleet Weather Center Component Bahrain, and Joint Typhoon Warning Center. Fleet Weather Center Norfolk is ISC to Strike Group Oceanography Team Norfolk and Naval Ice Command. The Naval Oceanography Operations Command is ISC to Fleet Survey Team and Naval Oceanography Special Warfare Center.
