= VT Halter Marine =

American shipbuilding company, 1956–2022

VT Halter Marine, Inc.
- Type: Shipbuilding, defense contractor
- Industry: Shipbuilding, arms industry
- Founded: 1956; 70 years ago in New Orleans, Louisiana
- Founder: Harold Halter; Jimmy Dubuisson
- Defunct: November 14, 2022
- Fate: Merged into Bollinger Shipyards
- Headquarters: Pascagoula, Mississippi, United States
- Parent: Trinity Industries (1983-1996) Friede Goldman International (1999-2003) ST Engineering (2003-2022)
- Website: www.vthaltermarine.com

VT Halter Marine, Inc. was a shipbuilding company and an American subsidiary of ST Engineering. It was located in Pascagoula, Mississippi. It specialized in ship design and construction and served both public and private clients, including the United States Department of Defense.

== History ==
Harold Halter and Jimmy Dubuisson started the original company known as Halter Marine in 1956 in New Orleans; their first built vessel was a 26-foot pleasure boat. The original company would grow to employ more than 4,000 people at its height, but the decline of the offshore oil industry led Halter to sell the company to Trinity Industries in 1983, where it became part of Trinity Marine Group. In September 1996, Trinity spun off several bluewater shipyard assets as a separate company using the name Halter Marine Group, Inc. Friede Goldman International bought Halter Marine Group in 1999. The company was sold again to ST Engineering (Singapore Technologies Engineering Ltd) in 2003, where it began operating under the name VT Halter Marine Inc.

In 2019, VT Halter was awarded a $1.9 billion contract by the United States Coast Guard for the design and construction of new Polar Security Cutter heavy icebreakers.

In November 2022, Bollinger Shipyards agreed to buy Halter Marine and the adjacent ST Engineering Halter Marine Offshore for $15 million from parent ST Engineering North America. The newly acquired shipyards was renamed to Bollinger Mississippi Shipbuilding and Bollinger Mississippi Repair respectively.

== Safety ==
In 2009, while working on an $87 million contract with the United States Navy to build the 350-foot survey vessel USNS Maury (renamed Marie Tharp ca.2016), unsafe working conditions led to an explosion that killed two employees and injured five others. The company was fined $1.32 million by the United States Department of Labor for 17 willful and 11 serious violations, including willfully exposing workers to toxic fumes in a confined space. According to Secretary of Labor Hilda L. Solis, the explosion "was a horrific and preventable situation. VT Halter Marine was aware of the hazards and knowingly and willfully sent workers into a confined space with an explosive and toxic atmosphere."

== See also ==
- Ambassador MK III missile boat
