= June 21 =

June 21 this year in various calendars
- Sunday, 21 June 2026
Akan	Monokwasi
Armenian	6 Hrotich 1475
Aztec	Tepeilhuitl 2, 7 Itzcuintli
Babylonian	5 Simanu, 2337 SE
Balinese pawukon	Luang, Pepet, Kajeng, Menala, Wage, Maulu, Redite of Kuningan, Yama, Gigis, Raksasa
Bengali	7 Asharh, BS 1433
Chinese	Yang Fire Tiger・Star Mansion; Fire Horse Year, Month 5, Day 7 (Xiazhi, 16 days until Xiaoshu)
Common Era	21 June 2026 CE
Coptic	14 Paoni, AM 1742
Egyptian	6 Athyr, 2775 NE
Ethiopian	14 Sanē, 2018 Amätä Məhrät
French Republican	Décade I, Tridi de Messidor de l'Année 234 de la République
Gregorian	21 June, AD 2026
Hebrew	6 Tamuz, AM 5786
Hindu	Pūrvaphalgunī・Siddhi; Solar: 7 Āṣāḍha, 1948 SE; Lunisolar: Saptamī, Śukla pakṣa of Jyeṣṭha, 2083 VE; Rāudra・5127 KY・1,872,747
Icelandic	Sunnudagur, 30 Skerpla 2026
Islamic	5 Muharram, AH 1448 (using tabular method)
ISO week date	2026-W25-7
Japanese	7 Satsuki, Reiwa 8 (Geshi, 16 days until Shōsho)
Julian	8 June, AD 2026 (AM 7534)
Julian day	2461213
Korean	7 Maldal, 4359 DE
Maya	13.0.13.12.10; 3 Tzec, 7 Oc
Roman	ante diem VI Idus Iunias, MMDCCLXXIX AUC
Solar Hijri	31 Khordad, SH 1405
Tibetan	7 snron, me pho rta 2153 or 1772 or 1000

<<	June					>>
Su	Mo	Tu	We	Th	Fr	Sa
	1	2	3	4	5	6
7	8	9	10	11	12	13
14	15	16	17	18	19	20
21	22	23	24	25	26	27
28	29	30
2026

June 21 in recent years
2026 (Sunday)
2025 (Saturday)
2024 (Friday)
2023 (Wednesday)
2022 (Tuesday)
2021 (Monday)
2020 (Sunday)
2019 (Friday)
2018 (Thursday)
2017 (Wednesday)

June 21 is the 172nd day of the year (173rd in leap years) in the Gregorian calendar; 193 days remain until the end of the year.

It is the most common day on which the June solstice occurs, in the astronomical reckoning the first day of summer in the Northern Hemisphere and of winter in the Southern Hemisphere.

== Events ==
=== Pre-1600 ===
- 217 BC – A Carthaginian force under Hannibal ambushes and defeats a Roman army commanded by Gaius Flaminius in the battle of lake Trasimene during the Second Punic War.
- 533 – A Byzantine expeditionary fleet under Belisarios sails from Constantinople to attack the Vandals in Africa, via Greece and Sicily.
- 870 – Caliph al-Muhtadi is killed by rebellious troops and is succeeded by his cousin Al-Mu'tamid.
- 1010 – An Umayyad-Catalan army is defeated by the Berbers near the Guadiaro river
- 1307 – Külüg Khan is enthroned as Khagan of the Mongols and Wuzong of the Yuan.
- 1529 – French forces are driven out of northern Italy by Spain at the Battle of Landriano during the War of the League of Cognac.
- 1582 – Sengoku period: Oda Nobunaga, the most powerful of the Japanese daimyōs, is forced to commit suicide by his own general Akechi Mitsuhide.

=== 1601–1900 ===
- 1621 – Execution of 27 Czech noblemen on the Old Town Square in Prague as a consequence of the Battle of White Mountain.
- 1734 – In Montreal, New France, a slave known by the French name of Marie-Joseph Angélique is put to death, having been convicted of setting the fire that destroyed much of the city.
- 1749 – Halifax, Nova Scotia, is founded.
- 1768 – James Otis Jr. offends the King and Parliament in a speech to the Massachusetts General Court.
- 1788 – New Hampshire becomes the ninth state to ratify the Constitution of the United States.
- 1791 – King Louis XVI and his immediate family begin the Flight to Varennes during the French Revolution.
- 1798 – Irish Rebellion of 1798: The British Army defeats Irish rebels at the Battle of Vinegar Hill.
- 1813 – Peninsular War: Wellington defeats Joseph Bonaparte at the Battle of Vitoria.
- 1824 – Greek War of Independence: Egyptian forces capture Psara in the Aegean Sea.
- 1826 – Maniots defeat Egyptians under Ibrahim Pasha in the Battle of Vergas.
- 1848 – In the Wallachian Revolution, Ion Heliade Rădulescu and Christian Tell issue the Proclamation of Islaz and create a new republican government.
- 1864 – American Civil War: The Battle of Jerusalem Plank Road begins.
- 1898 – The United States captures Guam from Spain. The few warning shots fired by the U.S. naval vessels are misinterpreted as salutes by the Spanish garrison, which was unaware that the two nations were at war.
- 1900 – Boxer Rebellion: China formally declares war on the United States, Britain, Germany, France and Japan, as an edict issued from the Empress Dowager Cixi.

=== 1901–present ===
- 1915 – The U.S. Supreme Court hands down its decision in Guinn v. United States 238 US 347 1915, striking down Oklahoma grandfather clause legislation which had the effect of denying the right to vote to African-Americans.
- 1919 – The Royal Canadian Mounted Police fire a volley into a crowd of unemployed war veterans, killing two, during the Winnipeg general strike.
- 1919 – Admiral Ludwig von Reuter scuttles the German fleet at Scapa Flow, Orkney. The nine sailors killed are the last casualties of World War I.
- 1921 – The Irish village of Knockcroghery is burned by British forces.
- 1929 – An agreement brokered by U.S. Ambassador Dwight Whitney Morrow ends the Cristero War in Mexico.
- 1930 – One-year conscription comes into force in France.
- 1940 – World War II: Italy begins an unsuccessful invasion of France.
- 1941 – Having defeated forces of Vichy France, Allied forces capture Damascus.
- 1942 – World War II: Tobruk falls to Italian and German forces; 33,000 Allied troops are taken prisoner.
- 1942 – World War II: A Japanese submarine surfaces near the Columbia River in Oregon, firing 17 shells at Fort Stevens in one of only a handful of attacks by Japan against the United States mainland.
- 1945 – World War II: The Battle of Okinawa ends when the organized resistance of Imperial Japanese Army forces collapses in the Mabuni area on the southern tip of the main island.
- 1952 – The Philippine School of Commerce, through a republic act, is converted to Philippine College of Commerce, later to be the Polytechnic University of the Philippines.
- 1957 – Ellen Fairclough is sworn in as Canada's first female Cabinet Minister.
- 1963 – Cardinal Giovanni Battista Montini is elected as Pope Paul VI.
- 1964 – Three civil rights workers, Andrew Goodman, James Chaney and Michael Schwerner, are murdered in Neshoba County, Mississippi, United States, by members of the Ku Klux Klan.
- 1970 – Penn Central declares Section 77 bankruptcy in what was the largest U.S. corporate bankruptcy to date.
- 1973 – The Primer Congreso del Hombre Andino is inaugurated in Arica, Chile.
- 1973 – In its decision in Miller v. California, 413 U.S. 15, the Supreme Court of the United States establishes the Miller test for determining whether something is obscene and not protected speech under the U.S. constitution.
- 1978 – The original production of Tim Rice and Andrew Lloyd Webber's musical, Evita, based on the life of Eva Perón, opens at the Prince Edward Theatre, London.
- 1982 – John Hinckley is found not guilty by reason of insanity for the attempted assassination of U.S. President Ronald Reagan.
- 1985 – Braathens SAFE Flight 139 is hijacked on approach to Oslo Airport, Fornebu. Special forces arrest the hijacker and there are no fatalities.
- 1989 – The U.S. Supreme Court rules in Texas v. Johnson, 491 U.S. 397, that American flag-burning is a form of political protest protected by the First Amendment.
- 1993 – Space Shuttle Endeavour is launched on STS-57 to retrieve the European Retrievable Carrier (EURECA) satellite. It is also the first shuttle mission to carry the Spacehab module.
- 2000 – Section 28 (of the Local Government Act 1988), outlawing the 'promotion' of homosexuality in the United Kingdom, is repealed in Scotland with a 99 to 17 vote.
- 2001 – A federal grand jury in Alexandria, Virginia, indicts 13 Saudis and a Lebanese in the 1996 bombing of the Khobar Towers in Saudi Arabia that killed 19 American servicemen.
- 2004 – SpaceShipOne becomes the first privately funded spaceplane to achieve spaceflight.
- 2005 – Edgar Ray Killen, who had previously been unsuccessfully tried for the murders of James Chaney, Andrew Goodman, and Mickey Schwerner, is convicted of manslaughter 41 years afterwards (the case had been reopened in 2004).
- 2006 – Pluto's newly discovered moons are officially named Nix and Hydra.
- 2006 – A Yeti Airlines de Havilland Canada DHC-6 Twin Otter crashes at Jumla Airport in Nepal, killing nine people.
- 2009 – Greenland assumes self-rule.
- 2012 – A boat carrying more than 200 migrants capsizes in the Indian Ocean between the Indonesian island of Java and Christmas Island, killing 17 people and leaving 70 others missing.
- 2012 – An Indonesian Air Force Fokker F27 Friendship crashes near Halim Perdanakusuma International Airport, killing 11.
- 2025 – A hot air balloon catches fire mid-flight and crashes in Praia Grande, Santa Catarina, Brazil, killing 8 of the 21 on board.

== Births ==
=== Pre-1600 ===
- 906 – Abu Ja'far Ahmad ibn Muhammad, Saffarid emir (died 963)
- 1002 – Pope Leo IX (died 1054)
- 1226 – Bolesław V the Chaste of Poland (died 1279)
- 1521 – John II, Duke of Schleswig-Holstein-Haderslev (died 1580)
- 1528 – Maria of Austria, Holy Roman Empress (died 1603)
- 1535 – Leonhard Rauwolf, German physician and botanist (died 1596)
- 1565 – Scipione Chiaramonti, Italian philosopher and astronomer (died 1652)

=== 1601–1900 ===
- 1630 – Samuel Oppenheimer, German Jewish banker and diplomat (died 1703)
- 1636 – Godefroy Maurice de La Tour d'Auvergne, Duke of Bouillon, French noble (died 1721)
- 1639 – (O.S.) Increase Mather, American minister and author (died 1723)
- 1676 – (O.S.) Anthony Collins, English philosopher and author (died 1729)
- 1706 – John Dollond, English optician and astronomer (died 1761)
- 1710 – James Short, Scottish-English mathematician and optician (died 1768)
- 1712 – Luc Urbain de Bouëxic, comte de Guichen, French admiral (died 1790)
- 1730 – Motoori Norinaga, Japanese poet and scholar (died 1801)
- 1732 – Johann Christoph Friedrich Bach, German pianist and composer (died 1791)
- 1736 – (O.S.) Enoch Poor, American general (died 1780)
- 1741 – Prince Benedetto, Duke of Chablais (died 1808)
- 1750 – Pierre-Nicolas Beauvallet, French sculptor and illustrator (died 1818)
- 1759 – Alexander J. Dallas, American lawyer and politician, 6th United States Secretary of the Treasury (died 1817)
- 1763 – Pierre Paul Royer-Collard, French philosopher and academic (died 1845)
- 1764 – Sidney Smith, English admiral and politician (died 1840)
- 1774 – Daniel D. Tompkins, American lawyer and politician, 6th Vice President of the United States (died 1825)
- 1781 – Siméon Denis Poisson, French mathematician and physicist (died 1840)
- 1786 – Charles Edward Horn, English opera singer and composer (died 1849)
- 1792 – Ferdinand Christian Baur, German theologian and scholar (died 1860)
- 1797 – Wilhelm Küchelbecker, Russian poet and author (died 1846)
- 1798 – Alexander Thomson of Banchory, Scottish jurist, agriculturalist and religious activist (died 1868)
- 1802 – Karl Zittel, German theologian (died 1871)
- 1805 – Karl Friedrich Curschmann, German composer and singer (died 1841)
- 1805 – Charles Thomas Jackson, American physician and geologist (died 1880)
- 1811 – Matthew Simpson, American Methodist bishop and academic (died 1884)
- 1814 – Paweł Bryliński, Polish sculptor (died 1890)
- 1814 – Anton Nuhn, German anatomist and academic (died 1889)
- 1823 – Jean Chacornac, French astronomer (died 1873)
- 1825 – Thomas Edward Cliffe Leslie, Irish economist and jurist (died 1882)
- 1825 – William Stubbs, English bishop and historian (died 1901)
- 1828 – Ferdinand André Fouqué, French geologist and academic (died 1904)
- 1828 – Nikolaus Nilles, German Catholic writer and teacher (died 1907)
- 1834 – Frans de Cort, Flemish poet and author (died 1878)
- 1836 – Luigi Tripepi, Italian theologian (died 1906)
- 1839 – Joaquim Maria Machado de Assis, Brazilian author, poet, and playwright (died 1908)
- 1845 – Samuel Griffith, Welsh-Australian politician, 9th Premier of Queensland (died 1920)
- 1845 – Arthur Cowper Ranyard, English astrophysicist and astronomer (died 1894)
- 1846 – Marion Adams-Acton, Scottish-English author and playwright (died 1928)
- 1846 – Enrico Coleman, Italian painter (died 1911)
- 1850 – Daniel Carter Beard, American author and illustrator, co-founded the Boy Scouts of America (died 1941)
- 1857 – Charles Alderton, American pharmacist, founded Dr. Pepper (died 1941)
- 1858 – Giuseppe De Sanctis, Italian painter (died 1924)
- 1858 – Medardo Rosso, Italian sculptor and educator (died 1928)
- 1859 – Henry Ossawa Tanner, American-French painter and illustrator (died 1937)
- 1860 – William Dobinson Halliburton, British physiologist and biochemist (died 1931)
- 1862 – Damrong Rajanubhab, Thai historian and author (died 1943)
- 1863 – Ludwig Lange, German physicist (died 1936)
- 1863 – Max Wolf, German astronomer and academic (died 1932)
- 1864 – Heinrich Wölfflin, Swiss historian and critic (died 1945)
- 1866 – Matt Kilroy, American baseball player (died 1940)
- 1867 – Oscar Florianus Bluemner, German-American painter and illustrator (died 1938)
- 1867 – William Brede Kristensen, Norwegian historian of religion (died 1953)
- 1868 – Edwin Stephen Goodrich, English zoologist and anatomist (died 1946)
- 1870 – Clara Immerwahr, Jewish-German chemist and academic (died 1915)
- 1870 – Anthony Michell, English-Australian engineer (died 1959)
- 1870 – Julio Ruelas, Mexican painter (died 1907)
- 1874 – Jacob Linzbach, Estonian linguist (died 1953)
- 1876 – Willem Hendrik Keesom, Dutch physicist and academic (died 1956)
- 1880 – Arnold Gesell, American psychologist and pediatrician (died 1961)
- 1880 – Josiah Stamp, 1st Baron Stamp, English economist and civil servant (died 1941)
- 1881 – (O.S.) Natalia Goncharova, Russian painter, costume designer, and illustrator (died 1962)
- 1882 – Ya'acov Ben-Dov, Israeli photographer and cinematographer (died 1968)
- 1882 – Lluís Companys, Spanish lawyer and politician, 123rd President of Catalonia (died 1940)
- 1882 – Adrianus de Jong, Dutch fencer and soldier (died 1966)
- 1882 – Rockwell Kent, American painter and illustrator (died 1971)
- 1883 – Feodor Gladkov, Russian author and educator (died 1958)
- 1884 – Claude Auchinleck, English field marshal (died 1981)
- 1887 – Norman L. Bowen, Canadian geologist and petrologist (died 1956)
- 1889 – Ralph Craig, American sprinter and sailor (died 1972)
- 1891 – Pier Luigi Nervi, Italian architect and engineer, co-designed the Pirelli Tower and Cathedral of Saint Mary of the Assumption (died 1979)
- 1891 – Hermann Scherchen, German-Swiss viola player and conductor (died 1966)
- 1892 – Reinhold Niebuhr, American theologian and academic (died 1971)
- 1893 – Alois Hába, Czech composer and educator (died 1973)
- 1894 – Milward Kennedy, English journalist and civil servant (died 1968)
- 1894 – Harry Schmidt, German mathematician and physicist (died 1951)
- 1896 – Charles Momsen, American admiral, invented the Momsen lung (died 1967)
- 1899 – Pavel Haas, Czech composer (died 1944)
- 1900 – Georges-Henri Bousquet, French economist and Islamologist (died 1978)

=== 1901–present ===
- 1903 – Hermann Engelhard, German runner and coach (died 1984)
- 1903 – Al Hirschfeld, American caricaturist, painter and illustrator (died 2003)
- 1905 – Jacques Goddet, French journalist (died 2000)
- 1905 – Jean-Paul Sartre, French philosopher and author (died 1980)
- 1906 – Grete Sultan, German-American pianist (died 2005)
- 1908 – William Frankena, American philosopher and academic (died 1994)
- 1908 – Helmut Ulm, German mathematician (died 1975)
- 1910 – Aleksandr Tvardovsky, Russian poet and author (died 1971)
- 1911 – Irving Fein, American producer and manager (died 2012)
- 1912 – Kazimierz Leski, Polish pilot and engineer (died 2000)
- 1912 – Mary McCarthy, American novelist and critic (died 1989)
- 1912 – Vishnu Prabhakar, Indian author and playwright (died 2009)
- 1913 – Madihe Pannaseeha Thero, Sri Lankan monk and scholar (died 2003)
- 1913 – Luis Taruc, Filipino political activist (died 2005)
- 1914 – William Vickrey, Canadian-American economist and academic, Nobel Prize laureate (died 1996)
- 1915 – Wilhelm Gliese, German soldier and astronomer (died 1993)
- 1916 – Joseph Cyril Bamford, English businessman, founded J. C. Bamford (died 2001)
- 1916 – Tchan Fou-li, Chinese photographer (died 2018)
- 1916 – Herbert Friedman, American physicist and astronomer (died 2000)
- 1916 – Buddy O'Connor, Canadian ice hockey player (died 1977)
- 1918 – Robert A. Boyd, Canadian engineer (died 2006)
- 1918 – James Joll, English historian, author, and academic (died 1994)
- 1918 – Eddie Lopat, American baseball player, coach, and manager (died 1992)
- 1918 – J. Clyde Mitchell, British sociologist and anthropologist (died 1995)
- 1918 – Dee Molenaar, American mountaineer (died 2020)
- 1918 – Robert V. Roosa, American economist and banker (died 1993)
- 1918 – Tibor Szele, Hungarian mathematician and academic (died 1955)
- 1918 – Josephine Webb, American engineer (died 2017)
- 1919 – Antonia Mesina, Italian martyr and saint (died 1935)
- 1919 – Gérard Pelletier, Canadian journalist and politician (died 1997)
- 1919 – Vladimir Simagin, Russian chess player and coach (died 1968)
- 1919 – Paolo Soleri, Italian-American architect, designed the Cosanti (died 2013)
- 1920 – Hans Gerschwiler, Swiss figure skater (died 2017)
- 1921 – Judy Holliday, American actress and singer (died 1965)
- 1921 – Jane Russell, American actress and singer (died 2011)
- 1921 – William Edwin Self, American actor, producer, and production manager (died 2010)
- 1922 – Joseph Ki-Zerbo, Burkinabé historian, politician and writer (died 2006)
- 1923 – Jacques Hébert, Canadian journalist and politician (died 2007)
- 1924 – Pontus Hultén, Swedish art collector and historian (died 2006)
- 1924 – Ezzatolah Entezami, Iranian actor (died 2018)
- 1924 – Wally Fawkes, British-Canadian jazz clarinetist and satirical cartoonist (died 2023)
- 1924 – Jean Laplanche, French psychoanalyst and academic (died 2012)
- 1925 – Larisa Avdeyeva, Russian mezzo-soprano (died 2013)
- 1925 – Stanley Moss, American poet, publisher, and art dealer (died 2024)
- 1925 – Giovanni Spadolini, Italian journalist and politician, 45th Prime Minister of Italy (died 1994)
- 1925 – Maureen Stapleton, American actress (died 2006)
- 1926 – Fred Cone, American football player (died 2021)
- 1926 – Conrad Hall, French-American cinematographer (died 2003)
- 1927 – Carl Stokes, American lawyer, politician, and diplomat, United States Ambassador to Seychelles (died 1996)
- 1928 – Wolfgang Haken, German-American mathematician and academic (died 2022)
- 1928 – Fiorella Mari, Brazilian-Italian actress (died 1983)
- 1928 – Margit Bara, Hungarian actress (died 2016)
- 1930 – Gerald Kaufman, English journalist and politician, Shadow Foreign Secretary (died 2017)
- 1930 – Mike McCormack, American football player and coach (died 2013)
- 1931 – Zlatko Grgić, Croatian-Canadian animator, director, and screenwriter (died 1988)
- 1931 – Margaret Heckler, American journalist, lawyer, and politician, 15th United States Secretary of Health and Human Services (died 2018)
- 1931 – David Kushnir, Israeli Olympic long-jumper (died 2020)
- 1932 – Bernard Ingham, English journalist and civil servant (died 2023)
- 1932 – Lalo Schifrin, Argentinian pianist, composer, and conductor (died 2025)
- 1932 – O.C. Smith, American R&B/jazz singer (died 2001)
- 1933 – Bernie Kopell, American actor and comedian
- 1934 – Josef Stoer, German mathematician
- 1935 – Françoise Sagan, French author and playwright (died 2004)
- 1937 – John Edrich, English cricketer and coach (died 2020)
- 1938 – Eddie Adcock, American bluegrass banjo player (died 2025)
- 1938 – Don Black, English songwriter
- 1938 – John W. Dower, American historian and author
- 1938 – Michael M. Richter, German mathematician and computer scientist (died 2020)
- 1940 – Mariette Hartley, American actress and television personality
- 1940 – Michael Ruse, Canadian philosopher and academic (died 2024)
- 1941 – Aloysius Paul D'Souza, Indian Catholic bishop
- 1941 – Joe Flaherty, American-Canadian actor, producer, and screenwriter (died 2024)
- 1941 – Lyman Ward, Canadian actor
- 1942 – Clive Brooke, Baron Brooke of Alverthorpe, English businessman and politician
- 1942 – Norbert Brunner, Swiss Catholic bishop
- 1942 – Paul Chernoff, American mathematician and poet (died 2017)
- 1942 – Jeannette Corbiere Lavell, Canadian and Anishinaabe activist
- 1942 – Marjorie Margolies, American journalist and politician
- 1942 – Henry S. Taylor, American author and poet (died 2024)
- 1942 – Flaviano Vicentini, Italian cyclist (died 2002)
- 1942 – Togo D. West Jr., American soldier, lawyer, and politician, 3rd United States Secretary of Veterans Affairs (died 2018)
- 1943 – Diane Marleau, Canadian accountant and politician, Canadian Minister of Health (died 2013)
- 1943 – Brian Sternberg, American pole vaulter (died 2013)
- 1944 – Ray Davies, English singer-songwriter and guitarist
- 1944 – Jon Hiseman, English drummer (died 2018)
- 1944 – Tony Scott, English-American director and producer (died 2012)
- 1945 – Robert Dewar, English-American computer scientist and academic (died 2015)
- 1945 – Adam Zagajewski, Polish author and poet (died 2021)
- 1946 – Per Eklund, Swedish race car driver
- 1946 – Kate Hoey, Northern Irish-British academic and politician, Minister for Sport and the Olympics
- 1946 – Brenda Holloway, American singer-songwriter
- 1946 – Trond Kirkvaag, Norwegian actor, director, and screenwriter (died 2007)
- 1946 – Malcolm Rifkind, Scottish lawyer and politician, Secretary of State for Scotland
- 1946 – Maurice Saatchi, Baron Saatchi, Iraqi-British businessman, founded M&C Saatchi and Saatchi & Saatchi
- 1947 – Meredith Baxter, American actress
- 1947 – Shirin Ebadi, Iranian lawyer, judge, and activist, Nobel Prize laureate
- 1947 – Michael Gross, American actor
- 1947 – Joey Molland, English singer-songwriter and guitarist (died 2025)
- 1947 – Wade Phillips, American football coach
- 1947 – Fernando Savater, Spanish philosopher and author
- 1948 – Jovan Aćimović, Serbian footballer and manager
- 1948 – Ian McEwan, British novelist and screenwriter
- 1948 – Andrzej Sapkowski, Polish author and translator
- 1948 – Philippe Sarde, French composer and conductor
- 1949 – John Agard, Guyanese-English author, poet, and playwright
- 1949 – Derek Emslie, Lord Kingarth, Scottish lawyer and judge
- 1950 – Anne Carson, Canadian poet and academic
- 1950 – Joey Kramer, American rock drummer and songwriter
- 1950 – Enn Reitel, Scottish actor and screenwriter
- 1950 – Trygve Thue, Norwegian guitarist and record producer (died 2022)
- 1950 – John Paul Young, Scottish-Australian singer-songwriter
- 1951 – Jim Douglas, American academic and politician, 80th Governor of Vermont
- 1951 – Terence Etherton, English lawyer and judge
- 1951 – Alan Hudson, English footballer
- 1951 – Nils Lofgren, American singer-songwriter and guitarist
- 1951 – Lenore Manderson, Australian anthropologist and academic
- 1951 – Mona-Lisa Pursiainen, Finnish sprinter (died 2000)
- 1952 – Judith Bingham, English singer-songwriter
- 1952 – Jeremy Coney, New Zealand cricketer and sportscaster
- 1952 – Patrick Dunleavy, English political scientist and academic
- 1952 – Kōichi Mashimo, Japanese director and screenwriter
- 1952 – Ginny Ruffner, American artist
- 1953 – Benazir Bhutto, Pakistani politician, Prime Minister of Pakistan (died 2007)
- 1953 – Augustus Pablo, Jamaican producer and musician (died 1999)
- 1954 – Már Guðmundsson, Icelandic economist, former Governor of Central Bank of Iceland
- 1954 – Mark Kimmitt, American general and politician, 16th Assistant Secretary, Bureau of Political-Military Affairs
- 1954 – Robert Menasse, Austrian author and academic
- 1955 – Tim Bray, Canadian software developer and businessman
- 1955 – Michel Platini, French footballer and manager
- 1956 – Rick Sutcliffe, American baseball player and broadcaster
- 1957 – Berkeley Breathed, American author and illustrator
- 1957 – Luis Antonio Tagle, Filipino cardinal
- 1958 – Víctor Montoya, Bolivian journalist and author
- 1958 – Gennady Padalka, Russian colonel, pilot, and astronaut
- 1959 – John Baron, English captain and politician
- 1959 – Tom Chambers, American basketball player and sportscaster
- 1959 – Marcella Detroit, American singer-songwriter and guitarist
- 1959 – Kathy Mattea, American singer-songwriter and guitarist
- 1960 – Kate Brown, American politician, 38th Governor of Oregon
- 1960 – Karl Erjavec, Slovenian politician
- 1961 – Manu Chao, French singer-songwriter, guitarist, and producer
- 1961 – Sascha Konietzko, German keyboard player and producer
- 1961 – Joko Widodo, Indonesian businessman and politician, 7th President of Indonesia
- 1961 – Kip Winger, American rock singer-songwriter and musician
- 1961 – Iztok Mlakar, Slovenian actor and singer-songwriter
- 1962 – Shōhei Takada, Japanese shogi player and theoretician
- 1962 – Viktor Tsoi, Russian singer-songwriter and guitarist (died 1990)
- 1963 – Dario Marianelli, Italian pianist and composer
- 1963 – Mike Sherrard, American football player
- 1964 – David Morrissey, English actor and director
- 1964 – Valeriy Neverov, Ukrainian chess player
- 1964 – Dimitris Papaioannou, Greek director and choreographer
- 1964 – Dean Saunders, Welsh footballer and manager
- 1964 – Doug Savant, American actor
- 1965 – David Beerling, English biologist and academic
- 1965 – Yang Liwei, Chinese general, pilot, and astronaut
- 1965 – Ewen McKenzie, Australian rugby player and coach
- 1965 – Lana Wachowski, American director, producer, and screenwriter
- 1966 – Gretchen Carlson, American model and TV journalist, Miss America 1989
- 1967 – Jim Breuer, American comedian, actor, and producer
- 1967 – Derrick Coleman, American basketball player and sportscaster
- 1967 – Pierre Omidyar, French-American businessman, founded eBay
- 1967 – Carrie Preston, American actress, director, and producer
- 1967 – Yingluck Shinawatra, Thai businesswoman and politician, 28th Prime Minister of Thailand
- 1968 – Sonique, English singer-songwriter and DJ
- 1970 – Eric Reed, American pianist and composer
- 1971 – Tyronne Drakeford, American football player
- 1972 – Nobuharu Asahara, Japanese sprinter and long jumper
- 1972 – Neil Doak, Northern Irish cricketer and rugby player
- 1972 – Irene van Dyk, South African-New Zealand netball player
- 1972 – Tomáš Valášek, Slovak diplomat and politician
- 1973 – Juliette Lewis, American actress and singer-songwriter
- 1973 – John Mitchell, English guitarist, vocalist and songwriter
- 1974 – Rob Kelly, American football player
- 1974 – Craig Lowndes, Australian race car driver
- 1974 – Flavio Roma, Italian footballer
- 1975 – Brian Simmons, American football player
- 1976 – Shelley Craft, Australian television host
- 1976 – Mike Einziger, American guitarist and songwriter
- 1976 – Nigel Lappin, Australian footballer and coach
- 1977 – Michael Gomez, Irish boxer
- 1977 – Al Wilson, American football player
- 1978 – Thomas Blondeau, Flemish writer (died 2013)
- 1978 – Matt Kuchar, American golfer
- 1978 – Cristiano Lupatelli, Italian footballer
- 1978 – Dejan Ognjanović, Montenegrin footballer
- 1978 – Rim'K, French rapper
- 1979 – Kostas Katsouranis, Greek footballer
- 1979 – Chris Pratt, American actor
- 1980 – Michael Crocker, Australian rugby league player and sportscaster
- 1980 – Łukasz Cyborowski, Polish chess player
- 1980 – Richard Jefferson, American basketball player
- 1980 – Sendy Rleal, Dominican baseball player
- 1981 – Yann Danis, Canadian ice hockey player
- 1981 – Garrett Jones, American baseball player
- 1981 – Brandon Flowers, American singer-songwriter
- 1981 – Brad Walker, American pole vaulter
- 1982 – Lee Dae-ho, South Korean baseball player
- 1982 – William, Prince of Wales, heir apparent to the British throne
- 1982 – Jussie Smollett, American actor and singer
- 1983 – Edward Snowden, American activist and academic
- 1985 – Kris Allen, American musician, singer and songwriter
- 1985 – Lana Del Rey, American singer-songwriter
- 1985 – Sentayehu Ejigu, Ethiopian runner
- 1985 – Byron Schammer, Australian footballer
- 1986 – Kathleen O'Kelly-Kennedy, Australian wheelchair basketball player
- 1986 – Hideaki Wakui, Japanese baseball player
- 1987 – Pablo Barrera, Mexican footballer
- 1987 – Sebastian Prödl, Austrian footballer
- 1987 – Dale Thomas, Australian footballer
- 1987 – Kim Ryeo-wook, South Korean singer
- 1988 – Allyssa DeHaan, American basketball and volleyball player
- 1988 – Alejandro Ramírez, American chess player
- 1988 – Paolo Tornaghi, Italian footballer
- 1988 – Thaddeus Young, American basketball player
- 1989 – Abubaker Kaki, Sudanese runner
- 1990 – Ričardas Berankis, Lithuanian tennis player
- 1990 – Sergei Matsenko, Russian chess player
- 1990 – François Moubandje, Swiss footballer
- 1990 – Håvard Nordtveit, Norwegian footballer
- 1990 – Isabel Pires, Portuguese politician
- 1991 – Gaël Kakuta, French footballer
- 1991 – Lee Min-young, South Korean singer-songwriter, actress, and entertainer
- 1992 – MAX, American singer, songwriter, actor, dancer and model
- 1992 – Hussein El Shahat, Egyptian professional footballer
- 1993 – Hungrybox, Argentine-American esports player
- 1994 – Başak Eraydın, Turkish tennis player
- 1996 – Tyrone May, Australian rugby league player
- 1996 – Scottie Scheffler, American golfer
- 1997 – Rebecca Black, American singer-songwriter
- 1997 – Derrius Guice, American football player
- 1998 – Isabel Atkin, British-American freestyle skier
- 1999 – Ky Rodwell, Australian rugby league player
- 2000 – Dylan Brown, New Zealand rugby league player
- 2001 – Alexandra Obolentseva, Russian chess player
- 2007 – Nanou Philips, Belgian ASMR social media personality
- 2011 – Lil Bub, American celebrity cat (died 2019)

== Deaths ==
=== Pre-1600 ===
- 532 – Emperor Jiemin of Northern Wei, former Northern Wei emperor
- 866 – Rodulf, Frankish archbishop
- 868 – Ali al-Hadi, the tenth Imam of Shia Islam (born 829)
- 870 – Al-Muhtadi, Muslim caliph
- 947 – Zhang Li, official of the Liao Dynasty
- 1040 – Fulk III, Count of Anjou (born 972)
- 1171 – Walter de Luci, French-English monk (born 1103)
- 1208 – Philip of Swabia (born 1177)
- 1305 – Wenceslaus II of Bohemia (born 1271)
- 1359 – Erik Magnusson, king of Sweden (born 1339)
- 1377 – Edward III of England (born 1312)
- 1421 – Jean Le Maingre, French general (born 1366)
- 1527 – Niccolò Machiavelli, Italian historian and author (born 1469)
- 1529 – John Skelton, English poet and educator (born 1460)
- 1547 – Sebastiano del Piombo, Italian painter and educator (born 1485)
- 1558 – Piero Strozzi, Italian general (born 1510)
- 1582 – Oda Nobunaga, Japanese warlord (born 1534)
- 1585 – Henry Percy, 8th Earl of Northumberland (born 1532)
- 1591 – Aloysius Gonzaga, Italian saint (born 1568)
- 1596 – Jean Liebault, French agronomist and physician (born 1535)

=== 1601–1900 ===
- 1621 – Louis III, Cardinal of Guise (born 1575)
- 1621 – Kryštof Harant, Czech soldier and composer (born 1564)
- 1622 – Salomon Schweigger, German theologian (born 1551)
- 1631 – John Smith, English admiral and explorer (born 1580)
- 1652 – Inigo Jones, English architect, designed the Queen's House and Wilton House (born 1573)
- 1661 – Andrea Sacchi, Italian painter (born 1599)
- 1737 – Matthieu Marais, French author, critic, and jurist (born 1664)
- 1738 – Charles Townshend, 2nd Viscount Townshend, English politician, Lord Lieutenant of Ireland (born 1674)
- 1765 – Nachman of Horodenka, Hasidic rabbi
- 1796 – Richard Gridley, American soldier and engineer (born 1710)
- 1824 – Étienne Aignan, French playwright and translator (born 1773)
- 1865 – Frances Adeline Seward, American wife of William H. Seward (born 1824)
- 1874 – Anders Jonas Ångström, Swedish physicist and astronomer (born 1814)
- 1876 – Antonio López de Santa Anna, Mexican general and politician 8th President of Mexico (born 1794)
- 1880 – Theophilus H. Holmes, American general (born 1804)
- 1893 – Leland Stanford, American businessman and politician, 8th Governor of California (born 1824)

=== 1901–present ===
- 1908 – Nikolai Rimsky-Korsakov, Russian composer and educator (born 1844)
- 1914 – Bertha von Suttner, Austrian journalist and author, Nobel Prize laureate (born 1843)
- 1929 – Leonard Trelawny Hobhouse, English sociologist, journalist, and academic (born 1864)
- 1934 – Thorne Smith, American author (born 1892)
- 1940 – Smedley Butler, American general, Medal of Honor recipient (born 1881)
- 1940 – Édouard Vuillard, French painter (born 1868)
- 1951 – Charles Dillon Perrine, American astronomer (born 1867)
- 1951 – Gustave Sandras, French gymnast (born 1872)
- 1951 – Ville Kiviniemi, Finnish politician (born 1877)
- 1952 – Wop May, Canadian captain and pilot (born 1896)
- 1954 – Gideon Sundback, Swedish-American engineer, developed the zipper (born 1880)
- 1957 – Claude Farrère, French captain and author (born 1876)
- 1957 – Johannes Stark, German physicist and academic, Nobel Prize laureate (born 1874)
- 1964 – James Chaney, American civil rights activist (born 1943)
- 1964 – Andrew Goodman, American civil rights activist (born 1943)
- 1964 – Michael Schwerner, American civil rights activist (born 1939)
- 1967 – Theodore Sizer, American professor of the history of art (born 1892)
- 1968 – Constance Georgina Tardrew, South African botanist (born 1883)
- 1969 – Maureen Connolly, American tennis player (born 1934)
- 1970 – Sukarno, Indonesian engineer and politician, 1st President of Indonesia (born 1901)
- 1970 – Piers Courage, English race car driver (born 1942)
- 1976 – Margaret Herrick, American librarian (born 1902)
- 1980 – Bert Kaempfert, German conductor and composer (born 1923)
- 1981 – Don Figlozzi, American illustrator and animator (born 1909)
- 1985 – Hector Boyardee, Italian-American chef and businessman, founded Chef Boyardee (born 1897)
- 1985 – Tage Erlander, Swedish lieutenant and politician, 25th Prime Minister of Sweden (born 1901)
- 1986 – Assi Rahbani, Lebanese singer-songwriter and producer (born 1923)
- 1987 – Madman Muntz, American engineer and businessman, founded the Muntz Car Company (born 1914)
- 1988 – Bobby Dodd, American football coach (born 1908)
- 1990 – Cedric Belfrage, English journalist and author, co-founded the National Guardian (born 1904)
- 1990 – June Christy, American singer (born 1925)
- 1992 – Ben Alexander, Australian rugby league player (born 1971)
- 1992 – Arthur Gorrie, Australian hobby shop proprietor (born 1922)
- 1992 – Rudra Mohammad Shahidullah, Bangladeshi poet, author, and playwright (born 1956)
- 1992 – Li Xiannian, Chinese captain and politician, President of China (born 1909)
- 1994 – William Wilson Morgan, American astronomer and astrophysicist (born 1906)
- 1997 – Shintaro Katsu, Japanese actor, singer, director, and producer (born 1931)
- 1997 – Fidel Velázquez Sánchez, Mexican trade union leader (born 1900)
- 1998 – Harry Cranbrook Allen, English historian (born 1917)
- 1998 – Anastasio Ballestrero, Italian cardinal (born 1913)
- 1998 – Al Campanis, American baseball player and manager (born 1916)
- 1999 – Kami, Japanese drummer (born 1973)
- 2000 – Alan Hovhaness, Armenian-American pianist and composer (born 1911)
- 2001 – John Lee Hooker, American singer-songwriter and guitarist (born 1917)
- 2001 – Soad Hosny, Egyptian actress and singer (born 1942)
- 2001 – Carroll O'Connor, American actor and producer (born 1924)
- 2002 – Timothy Findley, Canadian author and playwright (born 1930)
- 2003 – Roger Neilson, Canadian ice hockey player and coach (born 1934)
- 2003 – Leon Uris, American soldier and author (born 1924)
- 2004 – Leonel Brizola, Brazilian engineer and politician, Governor of Rio de Janeiro (born 1922)
- 2004 – Ruth Leach Amonette, American businesswoman (born 1916)
- 2005 – Jaime Sin, Filipino cardinal (born 1928)
- 2006 – Jared C. Monti, American sergeant, Medal of Honor recipient (born 1975)
- 2007 – Bob Evans, American businessman, founded Bob Evans Restaurants (born 1918)
- 2008 – Scott Kalitta, American race car driver (born 1962)
- 2010 – Russell Ash, English author (born 1946)
- 2010 – Irwin Barker, Canadian actor and screenwriter (born 1956)
- 2010 – İlhan Selçuk, Turkish lawyer, journalist, and author (born 1925)
- 2011 – Robert Kroetsch, Canadian author and poet (born 1927)
- 2012 – Richard Adler, American composer and producer (born 1921)
- 2012 – Abid Hussain, Indian economist and diplomat, Indian Ambassador to the United States (born 1926)
- 2012 – Sunil Janah, Indian photographer and journalist (born 1918)
- 2012 – Anna Schwartz, American economist and author (born 1915)
- 2013 – James P. Gordon, American physicist and academic (born 1928)
- 2013 – Elliott Reid, American actor and screenwriter (born 1920)
- 2014 – Yozo Ishikawa, Japanese politician, Japanese Minister of Defense (born 1925)
- 2014 – Walter Kieber, Austrian-Liechtenstein politician, 7th Prime Minister of Liechtenstein (born 1931)
- 2014 – Wong Ho Leng, Malaysian lawyer and politician (born 1959)
- 2015 – Darryl Hamilton, American baseball player and sportscaster (born 1964)
- 2015 – Veijo Meri, Finnish author and poet (born 1928)
- 2015 – Remo Remotti, Italian actor, playwright, and poet (born 1924)
- 2015 – Alexander Schalck-Golodkowski, German soldier and politician (born 1932)
- 2015 – Gunther Schuller, American horn player, composer, and conductor (born 1925)
- 2016 – Pierre Lalonde, Canadian television host and singer (born 1941)
- 2018 – Charles Krauthammer, American columnist and conservative political commentator (born 1950)
- 2023 – Winnie Ewing, Scottish politician (born 1929)
- 2024 – Frederick Crews, American essayist and literary critic (born 1933)

== Holidays and observances ==
- Christian feast day:
  - Alban of Mainz
  - Aloysius Gonzaga
  - Engelmund of Velsen
  - John Rigby
  - Martin of Tongeren
  - Mewan
  - Onesimos Nesib (Lutheran)
  - June 21 (Eastern Orthodox liturgics)
- Day of the Martyrs (Togo)
- Father's Day (Egypt, Lebanon, Jordan, Syria, Uganda, Pakistan, United Arab Emirates)
- Go Skateboarding Day
- International Yoga Day (international)
- National Indigenous Peoples Day (Canada)
- Solstice-related observances (see also June 20):
  - Day of Private Reflection (Northern Ireland)
  - National Day (Greenland)
  - We Tripantu, a winter solstice festival in the southern hemisphere. (Mapuche, southern Chile)
  - Willkakuti, an Andean-Amazonic New Year (Aymara)
  - Fête de la Musique
- World Humanist Day (Humanism)
- World Hydrography Day (international)
