= USS Littlehales =

A number of vessels of the United States Navy have borne the name Littlehales, after George W. Littlehales.

- USS Littlehales (AGS-7), a PCS-1376-class patrol craft, in service from 1943 until 1949.
- USS Littlehales (AGSC-15), a YF-852-class lighter, in service from 1952 until 1968.
- USNS Littlehales (T-AGS-52), a hydrographic survey vessel, in service from 1992 until 2003.
