= Zittel =

Zittel is a surname. Notable people with the surname include:

- Andrea Zittel (born 1965), American sculptor
- Julius Zittel (1869–1939), American architect
- Karl Alfred von Zittel (1839–1904), German paleontologist
- Karl Zittel (1802–1871), German Protestant theologian
- Michael Zittel (born 1951), German actor
