= Tuxpan River =

Tuxpan River or Río Tuxpan may refer to:

== Rivers ==
- Tuxpan River (Veracruz), in Mexico
- Tuxpan River (Jalisco), in Mexico

== Ships ==
- ARM Amealco, a Mexican Navy research ship formerly known as ARM Río Tuxpan and NOAAS Whiting
