= NOAAS Thomas Jefferson =

Hydrographic survey vessel

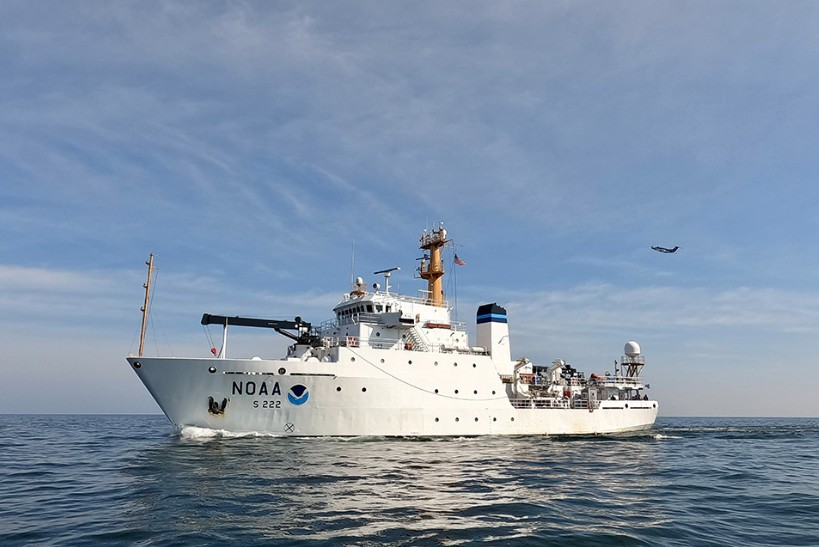
- NOAAS Thomas Jefferson (S 222) on Lake Erie off Cleveland, Ohio, in 2022. A NOAA aircraft collecting lidar data is visible above her stern.

History

United States
- Name: Littlehales
- Namesake: George Washington Littlehales
- Builder: Halter Marine, Inc., Moss Point, Mississippi
- Laid down: 25 October 1989
- Launched: 14 February 1991
- Completed: 10 January 1992 (delivered to U.S. Navy)
- Identification: IMO number: 8892033
- Fate: Transferred to NOAA 3 March 2003
- Notes: Served in U.S. Navy Military Sealift Command as USNS Littlehales (T-AGS-52), 1992-2003

United States
- Name: Thomas Jefferson
- Namesake: Thomas Jefferson (1743-1826), third President of the United States (1801-1809), who authorized the Survey of the Coast, the earliest ancestor organization of the National Oceanic and Atmospheric Administration (NOAA), in 1807
- Owner: NOAA
- Acquired: 3 March 2003
- Commissioned: 8 July 2003
- Home port: Norfolk, Virginia
- Identification: IMO number: 8892033; MMSI number: 369958000; Callsign: WTEA; Hull number: S 222
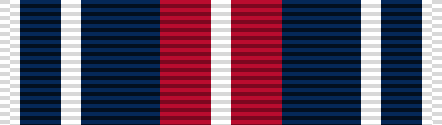
- Honors and awards: Department of Commerce Gold Medal
- Status: Active in NOAA Atlantic Fleet

General characteristics
- Type: Hydrographic survey vessel
- Tonnage: 1,772 GRT (US) 1,466 GT (ITC)
- Displacement: 2,000 tons (loaded)
- Length: 208.0 ft (63.4 m)
- Beam: 45.0 ft (13.7 m)
- Draft: 14.0 ft (4.3 m)
- Installed power: 2,550 brake horsepower (3.4 megawatts) main engine; 1,230 brake horsepower (1.64 megawatts) cruising engine
- Propulsion: One General Motors EMD12-645F7B turbocharged 900-rpm diesel engine, one Detroit Diesel 6V92N cruising diesel, one screw
- Speed: 14 knots (26 km/h; 16 mph) (max); 12 knots (22 km/h; 14 mph) (sustained); 4–6 knots (7.4–11.1 km/h; 4.6–6.9 mph) on cruising diesel
- Range: 19,200 nautical miles (35,600 km; 22,100 mi)
- Endurance: 45 days
- Boats & landing craft carried: Two 29.0 ft (8.8 m) survey launches, one 23.75 ft (7.24 m) (Zodiac) rigid-hulled inflatable boat, 1 iX Blue Drix USV Survey Drone
- Complement: 19 crew, 4 licensed engineers, 8 NOAA Corps commissioned officer, and up to 6 Hydrographic Survey Techss
- Sensors & processing systems: 3 Kongsberg EM2040 Multibeam, 1 Kongsberg EM712 Multibeam, 3 Edgetech Side Scan Sonar, 3 Klien Side Scan Sonar, 1 Kudo Sub bottom Profiler
- Aircraft carried: 5 drones
- Notes: 1,200 kilowatts electrical power

NOAAS Thomas Jefferson (S 222) is a National Oceanic and Atmospheric Administration (NOAA) hydrographic survey vessel in service since 2003. The ship was built for the United States Navy as USNS Littlehales (T-AGS-52) serving as one of two new coastal hydrographic survey vessels from 1992 until transfer to NOAA in 2003 when she was named after Founding Father and third U.S. president, Thomas Jefferson.

== USNS Littlehales ==
The third (Note: The first Littlehales was the former USS PCS-1388 launched in 1943, named and designated AGS-7 in 1945. That ship supported landings from Iwo Jima through Okinawa and then surveyed world wide until decommissioned 12 October 1949. The second was the converted lighter YF-854 built at the end of the war and activated and commissioned as USS YF-854 until renamed and redesignated 14 February 1959 as Littlehales (AGSC-15). That vessel surveyed the Atlantic coast until being assigned to the Atlantic Undersea Test and Evaluation Center (AUTEC) from 1962 until decommissioned in 1968.) hydrographic survey vessel to be named for mathematician, oceanographer, and civil engineer George Washington Littlehales, was laid down as the United States Navy USNS Littlehales (T-AGS-52) on October 25, 1989, by Halter Marine, Inc., at Moss Point, Mississippi. Launched on February 14, 1991, she was delivered to the Navy on January 10, 1992. The ship was operated by the Military Sealift Command with a contract crew for the Naval Oceanographic Office which assigned a military and civilian hydrographic detachment to conduct coastal surveys. The ship was the second hydrographic survey ship of the type, the first being USNS John McDonnell (T-AGS-51).

The two ships were replacements for the much larger Naval Oceanographic Office coastal hydrographic survey vessels USNS Chauvenet (T-AGS-29) and USNS Harkness (T-AGS-32). The new vessels were about half the length of those large survey ships with two rather than four survey launches. Contract crew size was 24 instead of 70 for the larger ships and the military and Naval Oceanographic Office civilian hydrographic detachment could be decreased from 80 to 10. With reliance on the Global Positioning System (GPS) for navigation and modern multibeam shallow-water sonar (SIMRAD EM100) and updated computer hardware and software for data processing the ships were expected to operate 24 hours a day, seven days a week collecting more soundings per mile than the older ships in coastal areas at depths up to 600 m (328 fathoms; 1,969 ft).

=== Operations ===
Littlehales conducted hydrographic surveys in domestic waters in support of Navy missions and in international and foreign waters in support of the Mapping, Charting, and Geodesy (MC&G) requirements of the National Geospatial-Intelligence Agency and its predecessor organization the Defense Mapping Agency. Those MC&G requirements support all military operations and also civilian mariners with products outside the U.S. territorial waters that are the charting responsibility of NOAA.

Examples of such hydrographic surveys that involve collection of tide and current information as well as depths include completion in 1994 of surveys of the coast of Albania that proved valuable for naval operations during the wars following the breakup of Yugoslavia. In 1999 the ship surveyed the Jordanian coastline including detailed surveys of the Port of Aqaba. During 2001 Littlehales surveyed the harbor and approaches Dakar, Senegal and experienced petty piracy early in the morning of 14 May when the watch noticed a small boat with eight persons which sped off with subsequent discovery that six mooring lines were missing.

Examples of operations in domestic waters include surveys from 29 October 2001 to 28 January 2002 of the area of King's Bay, Georgia and St. Marys River approaches. Unclassified extracts of the classified surveys done for the Naval Submarine Base Kings Bay were provided to NOAA which surveyed to fill gaps. The ship was also involved in test and evaluation of new systems. An example is work involving the Deep Ocean Logging Platform with Hydrographic Instrumentation and Navigation (DOLPHIN), a diesel powered semi-submersible for surveying. The Naval Research Laboratory (NRL) was tasked to evaluate the vehicle in conjunction with the National Oceanic and Atmospheric Administration, the Naval Oceanographic Office and the Canadian Hydrographic Service. Littlehales, NOAAS Whiting (S 329) and DOLPHIN surveyed parts of the Norfolk Canyon 62 nmi (71 mi; 115 km) off Cape Charles, Virginia.

=== Transfer to NOAA ===
The ship was stricken from the Naval Vessel Register on February 27, 2003, and transferred to NOAA on March 3, 2003.

== NOAAS Thomas Jefferson ==
The ship was commissioned into the NOAA Atlantic Fleet as NOAAS Thomas Jefferson (S 222) on July 8, 2003, at Norfolk, Virginia, as a replacement for the NOAA survey ship NOAAS Whiting (S 329). Thomas Jefferson's home port is Norfolk.

Thomas Jefferson, "The Most Productive Survey Vessel In The World", is designed to collect hydrographic data from depths of between 10 meters (33 feet) and 4,000 meters (13,123 feet). She has 700 square feet (65 m^{2}) of laboratory space and 2,300 square feet (214 m^{2}) of scientific storage space. She carries Global Positioning System and a computerized data-collection system. She has a roll stabilization tank and a collision avoidance system.

Thomas Jefferson has 1,500 square feet (139 m^{2}) of deck working space. Her deck equipment features two winches; two fixed, telescopic, 7-ton-capacity cranes; and a C-frame.

Thomas Jefferson is equipped with an intermediate depth multibeam swath survey system. The vessel carries two aluminum survey launches equipped with multibeam swath and single-beam echo sounders and a hydrographic data acquisition system. There is an additional rigid-hulled inflatable boat which serves as a fast rescue boat.

Among the scientific equipment are conductivity, temperature, and depth (CTD) sensors, three side-scan sonar units, and sediment sampling equipment.

Thomas Jefferson utilizes Kongsberg EM2040, EM710, and Klien 5000 Side Scan Sonar

The ship has a total of 36 bunk spaces. Capacity for 22 people to eat at time can be found in the mess rooms.

=== Operational history ===
==== 2003–2010 ====
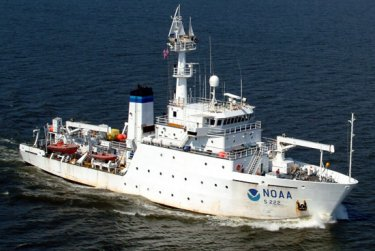
NOAAS Thomas Jefferson (S 222) underway.

In April 2003, after her transfer from the Navy to NOAA but before being commissioned into the NOAA fleet, the ship conducted surveys of the approaches to the Chesapeake Bay.

In 2004, Thomas Jefferson deployed her survey launches to participate in a survey by the United States Geological Survey of the sedimentary characteristics of Great Round Shoal at the far eastern edge of Nantucket Sound.

Thomas Jefferson got underway from Norfolk in 2005 for the United States Gulf Coast, where she played an active role in the response to Hurricane Katrina and Hurricane Rita by surveying port areas for obstructions. She surveyed the approaches to the Pascagoula and Gulfport, Mississippi, ship channels, and repaired the tide gauge at Pascagoula. She then conducted post-Rita surveys of the approaches to Galveston, Houston, and Port Arthur, Texas.

In 2006, Thomas Jefferson, in collaboration with the University of Rhode Island and the Institute for International Maritime Research, conducted a ten-day marine archaeological survey in a 74-square nautical mile (254-square kilometer) area off the coast of the Virginia-North Carolina border, employing side-scan sonar, a multibeam echosounder and a magnetometer in the hope of discovering the wreck of a ship that sank in the area in the early 17th century, the existence of which had been suggested in 1983 when fishermen hauled up a 400-year-old cannon in the area. The team identified approximately 200 targets in all, with 20 to 50 having the most promise of being the remains of a wooden ship from that period. It also documented numerous previously unknown dangers to navigation, including three unidentified shipwrecks.

In the autumn of 2006, Thomas Jefferson conducted hydrographic survey operations in New York Harbor, deploying her two survey launches to update the nautical charts for the area. Most of the project area was previously surveyed prior to 1982 and parts had not been surveyed since 1927. The work was challenging for the launches because of the busy shipping traffic in the harbor and currents from the Hudson River, East River, and Atlantic Ocean. Thomas Jefferson's survey resulted in the discovery of many unknown and forgotten small wrecks in Rockaway Inlet.

On 6 April 2010, Thomas Jefferson departed Norfolk bound for the Gulf of Mexico to conduct a five-month-long effort to map the seafloor, searching for hazards to navigation. On 26 May 2010, Thomas Jefferson was underway on a mission to deploy United States Navy ocean monitoring instruments near the BP Deepwater Horizon oil spill.

==== 2011–2020 ====
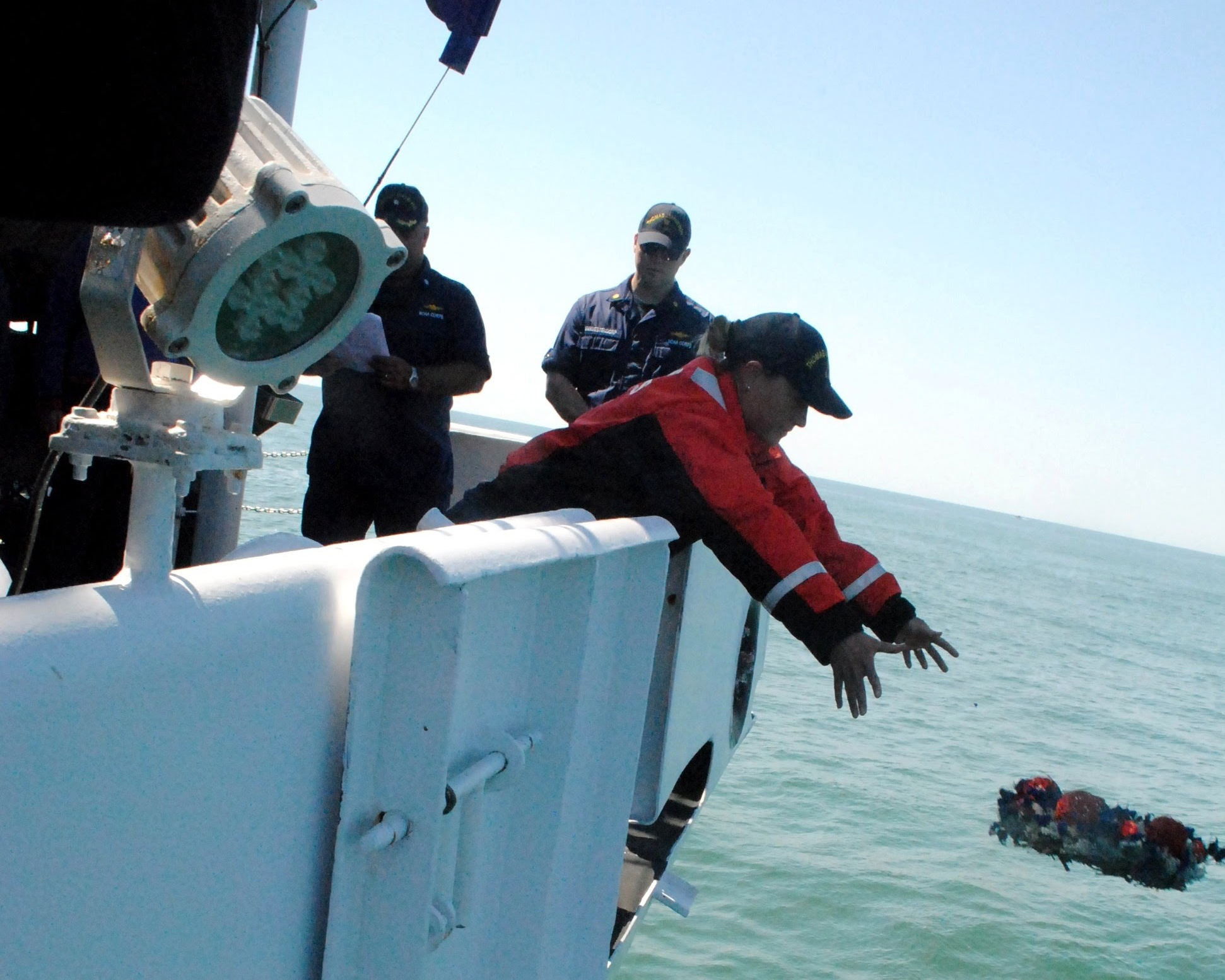
On 21 June 2013, Ensign Eileen Pye, NOAA Corps, lays a wreath from NOAAS Thomas Jefferson (S 222) over the waters of the Atlantic Ocean off New Jersey where the United States Coast Survey ship Robert J. Walker sank on 21 June 1860 with the loss of 20 men.

Thomas Jefferson conducted a 193-day deployment in 2012 which concluded with her return to her home port at NOAA's Atlantic Operations Center in Norfolk on 9 November 2012. During the cruise, she surveyed 14,768.9 linear nautical miles (27,352.0 linear km; 16,995.7 linear mi) covering 352 square nautical miles (1,210 km^{2}; 466 sq mi) of Long Island Sound and Block Island Sound, pinpointing 38 dangers to navigation. While surveying off Block Island on 26 August, she received a distress call at 09:04 reporting two divers missing in waters only a few hundred meters (yards) to her north. Thomas Jefferson suspended her surveying operations at 09:08 and began a search while embarked hydrographic survey personnel updated the divers' estimated position based on current set and drift. She sighted the divers at 09:52 and indicated their location to a United States Coast Guard rescue boat which pulled them from the water safely at 09:55. After Hurricane Sandy struck the coastal Mid-Atlantic region of the United States in late October, Thomas Jefferson also was in position to respond to a U.S. Coast Guard request to provide assistance in assessing damage in New York Harbor so that the Port of New York and New Jersey could reopen to traffic. Suspending her operations in Long Island Sound, she arrived at New York City early on 1 November, and she and her two survey launches began work immediately. Thomas Jefferson and her launches used sidescan sonar and multibeam sonar to survey 170.74 linear nmi (316.21 linear km; 196.48 linear mi) of the harbor, including 53.82 linear nmi (99.67 linear km; 61.93 linear mi) of object detection using multibeam sonar. They completed their New York survey work on 3 November.

On 21 June 2013, Thomas Jefferson observed World Hydrography Day by holding a wreath-tossing ceremony on the 153rd anniversary of the sinking of the United States Coast Survey steamer USCS Robert J. Walker, which sank after a collision on 21 June 1860 in the Atlantic Ocean off New Jersey. It was the first commemoration ever held for the 20 men lost in the sinking and an additional crewman who died of his injuries the following day, the largest loss of life in a single incident in the history of NOAA and its ancestor agencies. Lacking exact locating data for the wreck, Thomas Jefferson held the ceremony in the general area where Robert J. Walker sank. Later in the day, Thomas Jefferson used multibeam sonar and sidescan sonar to identify with 80 percent certainty the exact location and identity of Robert J. Walker's wreck for the first time. NOAA divers confirmed the wreck's identity on 23 June 2013.

In 2014, Thomas Jefferson completed the survey of Long Island Sound that she had begun in 2005. During this final deployment of the multi-year project, she surveyed 89 sq nmi (305 km^{2}; 118 sq mi) of eastern Long Island Sound, Fisher Island Sound, and western Block Island Sound. The work included surveys of essential habitats in Fisher Island Sound and a continuation of the post-Hurricane Sandy survey project begun in 2013. Upon completion of the year's survey work, she had updated hydrographic data for 95 percent of Long Island Sound and all of Block Island Sound since beginning the project in 2005. She interrupted this work briefly to call at City Pier at New London, Connecticut, on 12 and 13 September to take part in the 2014 Connecticut Maritime Heritage Festival. She hosted judges and the announcer during the festival's lighted boat parade on 12 September and held an open house on both days which attracted 500 visitors.

In the fall of 2015, Thomas Jefferson hosted a sub-lieutenant of the Nigerian Navy's Hydrographic Office, who spent three months aboard the ship with a goal of learning how hydrography is practiced outside of Africa. Working with the ship's crew and embarked scientists and technicians during his time aboard Thomas Jefferson, he gained practical experience as a sheet project manager — responsible for overseeing the data collection, processing, and quality control of a specific geographic sub-area of a mapping project — and in the acquisition of multibeam and sidescan sonar data, conductivity-temperature-depth casts, system integration, and troubleshooting aboard both Thomas Jefferson and her survey launches.

On 20 September 2017, Hurricane Maria made landfall in Puerto Rico as a Category 4 storm after ravaging the United States Virgin Islands. As the storm passed to the north, Thomas Jefferson transited from Port Everglades, Florida, to the islands. There the ship conducted multibeam echo sounder and side scan sonar hydrographic surveys in the island ports and bays. Survey data the ship collected helped inform U.S. Coast Guard and other national and regional authorities in making decisions as to whether to restrict commerce due to concerns over the safety of navigation or allow its resumption. Over three weeks the crew surveyed 13 areas and 18 individual port facilities and made emergency repairs to three tide and weather stations.

During surveying operations in 2018 in the Gulf of Mexico in the approaches to Galveston and Houston, Texas, and off Puerto Rico, Thomas Jefferson successfully tested a new wireless networking system connecting her with her two survey launches, allowing the three vessels to share environmental data in real time. At ranges of 3 to 5 nmi (5.6 to 9.3 km; 3.5 to 5.8 mi) in the Gulf of Mexico, the system was able to transfer data from one launch to Thomas Jefferson at rates greater than that of data acquisition by multibeam sonar, and the system performed well out to maximum test distance of 7 nmi (13 km; 8.1 mi). The ship operated around the coast of Puerto Rico from August to November, and in mid-August off Puerto Rico had a notable success when one launch succeeded in sharing its data with her in real time at a range of 5 nmi (9.3 km; 5.8 mi), while on 9 October the ship steered one of its launches via remote control while the launch collected and shared data with Thomas Jefferson in real time, an important milestone in NOAA's development of uncrewed surface vehicles to allow multiple networked vessels to survey larger areas more efficiently. While deployed to Puerto Rico, Thomas Jefferson also conducted seafloor surveys and observed possible shoreline changes. The ship also hosted 80 local high school students and gave them an in-depth look at the technology and capabilities of the ship. While Thomas Jefferson was anchored in Bahia de Guayanilla, her commanding officer went ashore to give a talk on nautical hydrography at a South Coast Harbor Safety and Security Committee meeting in Salinas, Puerto Rico.

==== 2021–present ====
In 2021 Thomas Jefferson received her fifth NOAA Ship of the Year award, making her the only NOAA ship named Ship of the Year five times and giving her the highest Ship of the Year award count of any ship in NOAA history.

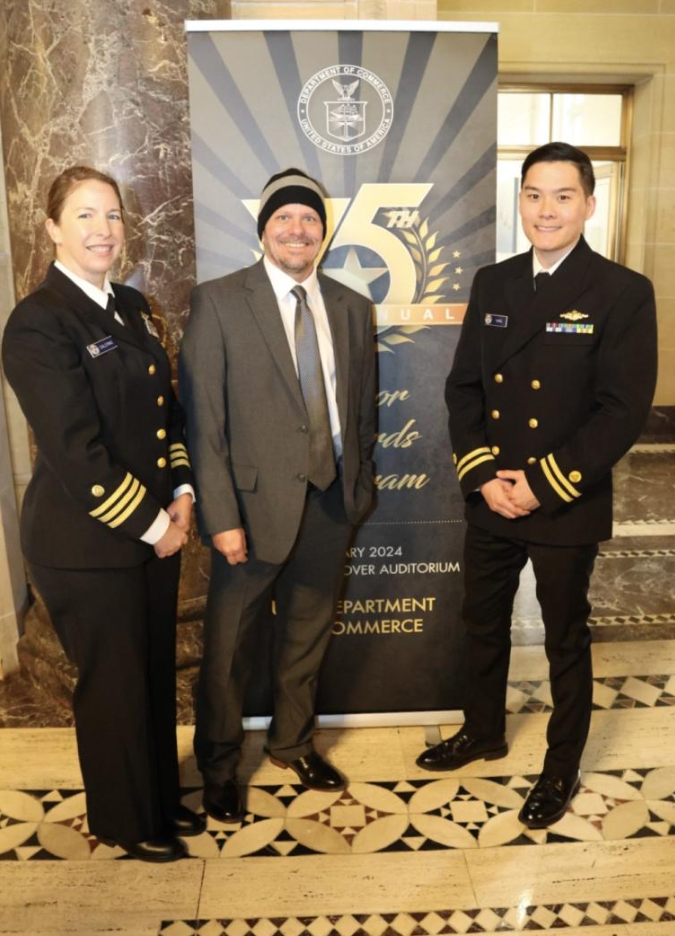
Crew members of NOAAS Ronald H. Brown (R 104), NOAAS Oregon II (R 332), and Thomas Jefferson at a ceremony on 6 February 2024 at United States Department of Commerce headquarters in Washington, D.C., to accept the Department of Commerce Gold Medal on behalf of their ships for lifesaving achievements.

In 2022, Thomas Jefferson became the first seagoing NOAA hydrographic survey ship to deploy to the Great Lakes since the early 1990s. She surveyed 450 square nautical miles (1,543 km^{2}; 596 sq mi) of Lake Erie. On 20 August 2022, she was operating in Lake Erie when she heard a distress call and sighted a red flare from a 12-foot (3.7 m) bass boat caught in a storm several miles off Cleveland, Ohio. The boat had lost propulsion and the three men on board did not have enough flotation devices or foul weather gear and were unable to reach shore. Thomas Jefferson came to their assistance, maneuvering alongside the boat and tying it to the ship's rail, then lowering a Jacob's ladder to the men in the boat so they could come aboard Thomas Jefferson. Thomas Jefferson′s crew treated the men for hypothermia until the United States Coast Guard arrived on the scene and took over the rescue.

On 3 October 2022, Thomas Jefferson departed Cleveland, conducted a final few hours of surveying, and then passed through the Welland Canal into Lake Ontario, where she spent seven days surveying waters proposed for inclusion in a new Lake Ontario National Marine Sanctuary. Her survey included 274 square nautical miles (940 km^{2}; 363 sq mi) of Lake Ontario, including the lake's deepest point at a depth of 244 meters (801 ft). A particular focus of her survey was a search for the wreck of the Canadian sloop Lady Washington, which sank off Oswego, New York, in 1803. In all, her 22 surveys of the two lakes mapped 42 shipwrecks — some previously identified, others new discoveries — along with 22 additional features of the lakes. After concluding her survey work in Lake Ontario, Thomas Jefferson began a 1,908-nautical-mile (3,534 km; 2,196 mi) voyage to Norfolk, Virginia, via the St. Lawrence River, St. Lawrence Bay, the Cabot Strait, and the Atlantic Ocean. She reached Norfolk on 21 October 2022, completing a 2,200-nautical-mile (4,074 km; 2,532 mi) journey from Cleveland. At Norfolk, she began an overhaul in November 2022 to prepare for survey work in the Gulf of Mexico in 2023.

For their role in rescuing the three fishermen in Lake Erie in 2022, Thomas Jefferson and her crew received the Department of Commerce Gold Medal in a ceremony at United States Department of Commerce headquarters in Washington, D.C., on 6 February 2024.

In April 2026, Thomas Jefferson entered the St. Lawrence Seaway bound for her first deployment to the Great Lakes since 2022. Plans called for her to spend the summer of 2026 mapping the waters of western and central Lake Erie and eastern Lake Ontario to improve navigation safety and conducting surveys within the Lake Ontario National Marine Sanctuary to identify critical habitats. Her operations are to include the use of a DriX uncrewed surface vehicle to accelerate her mapping work in Lake Ontario off Oswego, New York.

== Honors and awards ==
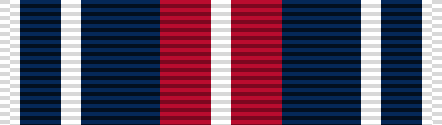
- Department of Commerce Gold Medal
