= NOAAS Whiting =

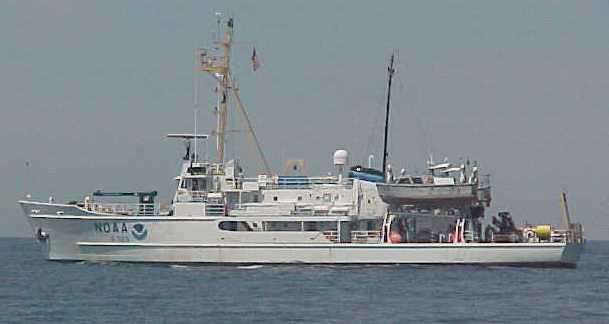
- NOAAS Whiting (S 329)

History

United States
- Name: USC&GS Whiting (CSS 29)
- Namesake: Henry Laurens Whiting (1821-1897), U.S. Coast Survey and U.S. Coast and Geodetic Survey employee (1838-1897) and renowned topographic surveyor
- Builder: Marietta Manufacturing Company, Point Pleasant, West Virginia
- Launched: 20 November 1962
- Acquired: July 1963 (delivery)
- Commissioned: 8 July 1963
- Fate: Transferred to National Oceanic and Atmospheric Administration 3 October 1970

United States
- Name: NOAAS Whiting (S 329)
- Namesake: Previous name retained
- Acquired: Transferred from U.S. Coast and Geodetic Survey 3 October 1970
- Decommissioned: 2 May 2003
- Home port: Norfolk, Virginia
- Identification: IMO number: 6601973; Radio call sign WTEW
- Fate: Transferred to Mexican Navy 28 April 2005

Mexico
- Name: Río Tuxpan (BI-12)
- Namesake: Tuxpan River; Amealco de Bonfil, a town in Querétaro, Mexico
- Acquired: Transferred from National Oceanic and Atmospheric Administration to Mexican Navy 28 April 2005
- Commissioned: 28 April 2005
- Renamed: ARM Amealco (BI-07), 2023
- Identification: IMO number: 6601973
- Status: Active

General characteristics
- Class & type: S1-MT-59a
- Type: Survey ship
- Tonnage: 696 gross register tons; 151 net tons
- Displacement: 907 tons
- Length: 49.7 m (163 ft)
- Beam: 10.1 m (33 ft)
- Draft: 3.4 m (11 ft) (maximum); 3.7 m (12 ft) (with IDSSS dome)
- Propulsion: Two geared 800-bhp (597-kW) General Motors diesel engines, two shafts, 4,300 U.S. gallons (16,277 liters fuel)
- Speed: 12.0 knots
- Range: 5,700 nm
- Endurance: 20 days
- Crew: 33 (8 officers, 25 other crew, 2 scientists) plus up to 6 temporarily embarked personnel

NOAAS Whiting (S 329), was an American survey ship that was in commission in the National Oceanic and Atmospheric Administration (NOAA) from 1970 to 2003. Previously, she had been in commission in the United States Coast and Geodetic Survey from 1963 to 1970 as USC&GS Whiting (CSS 29).

In 2005 the ship was transferred to Mexico, and she was commissioned in the Mexican Navy as ARM Río Tuxpan (BI-12), Mexico's first dedicated hydrographic survey ship, and then renamed ARM Amealco (BI-07) in 2023.

== Construction and commissioning ==
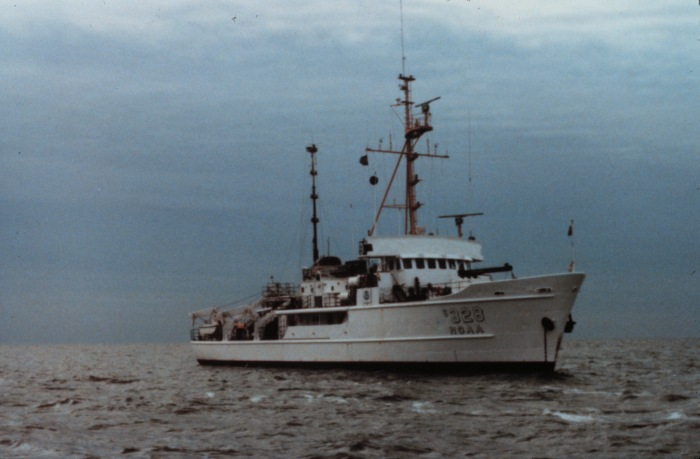
NOAAS Whiting (S 329)

Whiting was built at a cost of $2,300,000 (USD) as a "coastal survey ship" (CSS) for the U.S. Coast and Geodetic Survey by the Marietta Manufacturing Company at Point Pleasant, West Virginia. She was launched on 20 November 1962 and delivered in July 1963. The Coast and Geodetic Survey commissioned her on 8 July 1963 in a ceremony at New Orleans, Louisiana, as USC&GS Whiting (CSS 29), the first and only Coast and Geodetic Survey ship of the name. When the Coast and Geodetic Survey and other United States Government agencies merged to form NOAA on 3 October 1970, Whiting became a part of the NOAA fleet as NOAAS Whiting (S 329), thus far the only NOAA ship to bear the name.

== Capabilities ==
Whiting had a two-drum bathythermograph winch with a maximum pull of 1,000 pounds (454 kg). The lower drum had 3/16-inch (4.75-mm) wire rope, while the upper drum had 13,123 feet (4,000 meters) of 1/4-inch (6.4-mm) wire rope. She had a 27-foot (8.2-meter) telescoping boom with a lifting capacity of 2,500 pounds (1,100 kg) and a 27-foot (8.2-meter) articulating boom with a lifting capacity of 2,768 pounds (1,256 kg), as well as a 16-foot A-frame with a maximum load of 6,250 pounds (2,830 kg) and a working load of 5,000 pounds (2,300 kg).

For acoustic hydrography and bathymetry, Whiting had 12-Khz deep-water echosounder, a 100-kHz shallow-water echosounder-lOOKhz, a 24- and 100-kHz hydrographic survey sounder, and the Intermediate Depth Swath Survey System (IDSSS), which is a 36-kHz sidescan sonar. In 1989 she underwent a major upgrade involving the installation of Hydrochart II, which employed a Microvax computer system to acquire and process hydrographic data. Hydrochart II gave her the capability to generate bottom contour charts with a swath width of approximately two-and-a-half times the water depth, ranging from 10 to 1,000 meters (33 to 3,281 ft), in real time.

Whiting had an ice-strengthened steel hull.

Whiting carried two 29-foot (8.8-meter) aluminum-hulled diesel-powered Jensen survey launches. For utility and rescue purposes, she also carried two open boats with gasoline-powered outboard motors, a 16-foot (4.9-meter) Boston Whaler fiberglass-hulled boat and 17-foot (5.2-meter) Monark aluminum-hulled boat.

At the time of her decommissioning, Whiting was the most technologically advanced hydrographic survey platform in the world. She and her survey launches were outfitted with modern multibeam echosounders and sidescan sonars, allowing efficient and rapid hydrographic surveys. The data storage for survey data was close to 2 terabytes, and nine workstations allowed survey personnel to process the data with state-of-the-art software and create three-dimensional models of the ocean floor, side-scan mosaics, and imagery of historical wrecks.

== Operational career ==
Whiting conducted hydrographic and bathymetric surveys involving nautical charting and ocean mapping, primarily along the United States East Coast and United States Gulf Coast and off territories of the United States in the Caribbean. She also imaged historical wrecks like that of the United States Navy monitor USS Monitor and was used for oceanography, fisheries research, and homeland security surveys. During her 39-year career, her operations took her from as far north as Duluth, Minnesota, to as far south as Honduras in Central America.

=== John F. Kennedy Jr., crash ===
After receiving word that the Piper Saratoga II HP flown by John F. Kennedy Jr. had disappeared during a flight on the evening of 16 July 1999 and was feared to have crashed in the Atlantic Ocean off Martha's Vineyard, Massachusetts, Whiting, under the command of Lieutenant Commander Gerd F. Glang, interrupted her survey operations in the Delaware Bay on 18 July to make a 24-hour voyage at about 12 knots (14 mph; 22 km/h) to the search area and participate in the search for the aircraft and its passengers. Arriving on the scene on the morning of 19 July 1999, Whiting joined the NOAA survey ship NOAAS Rude (S 590), which had been searching for the wreckage of the aircraft since 17 July using sidescan sonar and multibeam sonar. Whiting brought a more advanced sidescan sonar – only recently installed aboard the ship – to the effort that allowed a higher resolution and a higher search speed. While Whiting searched one area in dense fog, dodging lobster pots, Rude found and marked a high-confidence target in another area that appeared to be the missing Saratoga and radioed the United States Navy rescue and salvage ship USS Grasp (ARS-51) about the discovery; Whiting then searched the same area to gain higher-resolution images of the target. Late on 20 July, U.S. Navy divers from Grasp confirmed that the target was the missing aircraft. Whiting and Rude competed their survey of the crash area on 21 July 1999, then assisted the United States Coast Guard in maintaining security in the area. Later on 21 July, the two ships were released from duty in the crash area, and Whiting set course for Washington, D.C., to take part in the assumption-of-command ceremony for incoming NOAA Corps Director Rear Admiral Evelyn J. Fields at the Washington Navy Yard on 27 July. On 30 July 1999, the U.S. Coast Guard presented personnel involved in the search-and-rescue effort, including the crews of Whiting and Rude, with a commendation

... for exceptionally meritorious service from 17 July 1999 to 23 July 1999 in the search and recovery of the downed aircraft carrying John F. Kennedy, Jr.; his wife, Carolyn Bessette-Kennedy; and her sister Lauren Bessette. Members of the Unified Command distinguished themselves during this complex operation with their professional expertise and poise.

=== Egyptair Flight 990 ===
Whiting again was operating in the Delaware Bay under Lieutenant Commander Glang's command when Egyptair Flight 990, a Boeing 767-300ER, crashed in the Atlantic Ocean about 40 miles (64 kilometers) south of Nantucket Island, Massachusetts, on 31 October 1999. The U.S. Coast Guard requested her support in the search for the downed aircraft, and she soon got underway for Naval Station Newport, Rhode Island, where she replenished her supplies and refueled before proceeding to the crash area. Arriving on the scene early on 2 November, she put her sidescan sonar to use and discovered the debris field of the crash on the ocean bottom on her first surveying pass, only 12 hours after arriving. After only a day of search operations, however, a gale with 50-knot (58-mph; 93-km/h) winds and 20-foot (6.1-meter) seas forced Whiting and U.S. Navy survey ships in the area to return early on 3 November to Newport, where Whiting's crew compared their survey data with data collected by U.S. Navy ships. A break in the weather allowed Whiting to return on 5 November to continue her bottom-mapping operations; although she had to suspend mapping operations briefly when the towfish containing her sidescan sonar became entangled in a lobster pot and was damaged, her crew was able to improvise a night repair in difficult weather conditions and put the sonar back into service. Whiting's bottom map combined with charts provided by NOAA's Office of Coast Survey allowed the U.S. Navy rescue and salvage ship USS Grapple (ARS-53) to anchor safely over the debris field without disturbing the wreckage. Having completed her Egyptair Flight 990 work and turned over continued mapping and search operations to U.S. Navy remotely operated vehicles, Whiting departed Naval Station Newport on 11 November 1999 to return to her home port at Norfolk, Virginia.

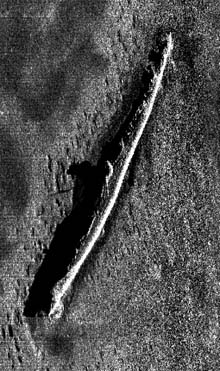
Whiting's first sonar image of the wreck of the U.S. Navy submarine USS S-5 (SS-110) on the bottom of the Atlantic Ocean, made in late July 2001 when Whiting discovered the wreck's exact location for the first time.

=== USS S-5 ===
In July 2001, NOAA's Office of Ocean Exploration asked Whiting to search for the wreck of the U.S. Navy submarine USS S-5 (SS-110), which sank 15 nautical miles (28 kilometres) off Cape May, New Jersey, in September 1920. Whiting, which had just completed a summer in port at Norfolk, Virginia, and was bound for Boston, Massachusetts, to conduct hydrographic survey operations in New England, paused off Cape May in late July 2001 to search for the wreck. Whiting's survey department approached the project as it would any typical hydrographic survey. Information on snags – obstructions on the ocean bottom that snarl fishing nets and gear – that local recreational fishermen had reported and reports of possible locations of the wreck from divers that had visited it provided Whiting with possible targets for her search. After her crew had prepared a plan for a systematic search, Whiting moved from target cluster to target cluster, mapping the ocean bottom using sidescan sonar. After eight hours of searching, Whiting found the wreck of S-5 directly over one of the suspected targets, made a sonar image of the wreck, and recorded its exact location. Whiting then made several more passes over the wreck to acquire additional images of it at various angles before leaving the scene. NOAA donated the sonar data NOAAS Whiting gathered to the Submarine Force Library and Museum in Groton, Connecticut, for archiving and display.

=== Decommissioning ===
Whiting made her final cruise in NOAA service in 2002, when she deployed to the United States Virgin Islands, the Gulf of Mexico, and the southeast coast of the United States in support of homeland security and nautical charting. She returned in November 2002, bringing an end to 39 years of service.

Finding the aging Whiting no longer economical to operate, NOAA decommissioned her on 2 May 2003. NOAA replaced her with the survey ship NOAAS Thomas Jefferson (S 222).

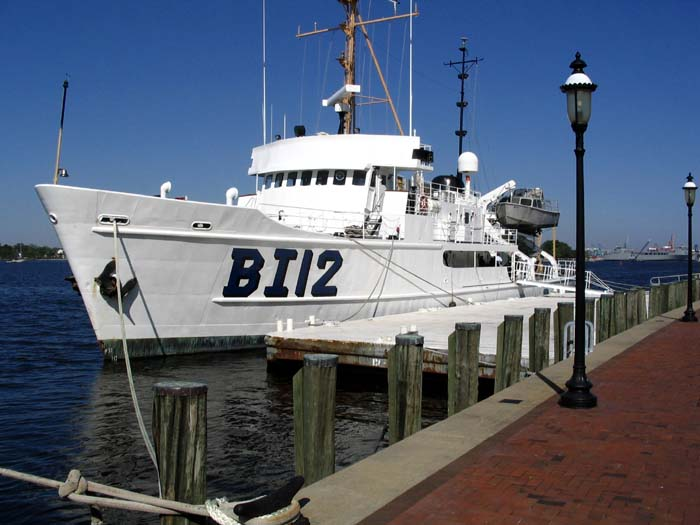
ARM Río Tuxpan (BI-12) pierside on the Elizabeth River at Town Point Park in Norfolk, Virginia, on 28 April 2005, the day of her transfer to Mexico and commissioning into Mexican Navy service.

== Mexican Navy service ==
After Whiting was decommissioned, the United States Congress authorized her transfer to Mexico with the stipulation that Mexico employ her in supporting the hydrographic activities of the United States-Mexico Cooperative Charting Advisory Committee so as to enhance cooperation between the United States and Mexico in surveying and charting the border waters of both countries in the Gulf of Mexico and in the Pacific Ocean. Accordingly, by the authority of the United States Secretary of Commerce, Whiting was transferred to Mexico in a ceremony at Norfolk, Virginia, on 28 April 2005. Mexico immediately commissioned her into service in the Mexican Navy as ARM Río Tuxpan (BI-12), Mexico's first dedicated hydrographic survey ship. In 2023 the ship was renamed ARM Amealco (BI-07).

== See also ==
- NOAA ships and aircraft
