= World Hydrography Day =

Publicate the importance of hydrographer

World Hydrography Day, 21 June, was adopted by the International Hydrographic Organization as an annual celebration to publicise the work of hydrographers and the importance of hydrography.

== Origins ==
The International Hydrographic Bureau was established in 1921 for the purpose of providing a mechanism for consultation between governments on such matters as technical standards, safe navigation and the protection of the marine environment. In 1970 the name was changed to the International Hydrographic Organization (IHO). The IHO is actively engaged in developing standards and interoperability, particularly in relation to the challenges brought about by digital technologies.

In 2005 the IHO adopted the concept of a World Hydrography Day, which was "welcomed" by the United Nations General Assembly in Resolution A/RES/60/30 Oceans and the law of the sea.

The date chosen for World Hydrography Day is the anniversary of the founding of the International Hydrographic Organization.

== Purpose ==
World Hydrography Day was adopted, in the words of the United Nations, with the aim of:

... giving suitable publicity to its [IHO's] work at all levels and of increasing the coverage of hydrographic information on a global basis ...

Translation of this aim through World Hydrography Day is achieved by the nomination of a theme for each year's celebration. Once a theme is agreed, the IHO Member States, international and national hydrographic organisations and services develop activity programs and events that highlight the annual theme.

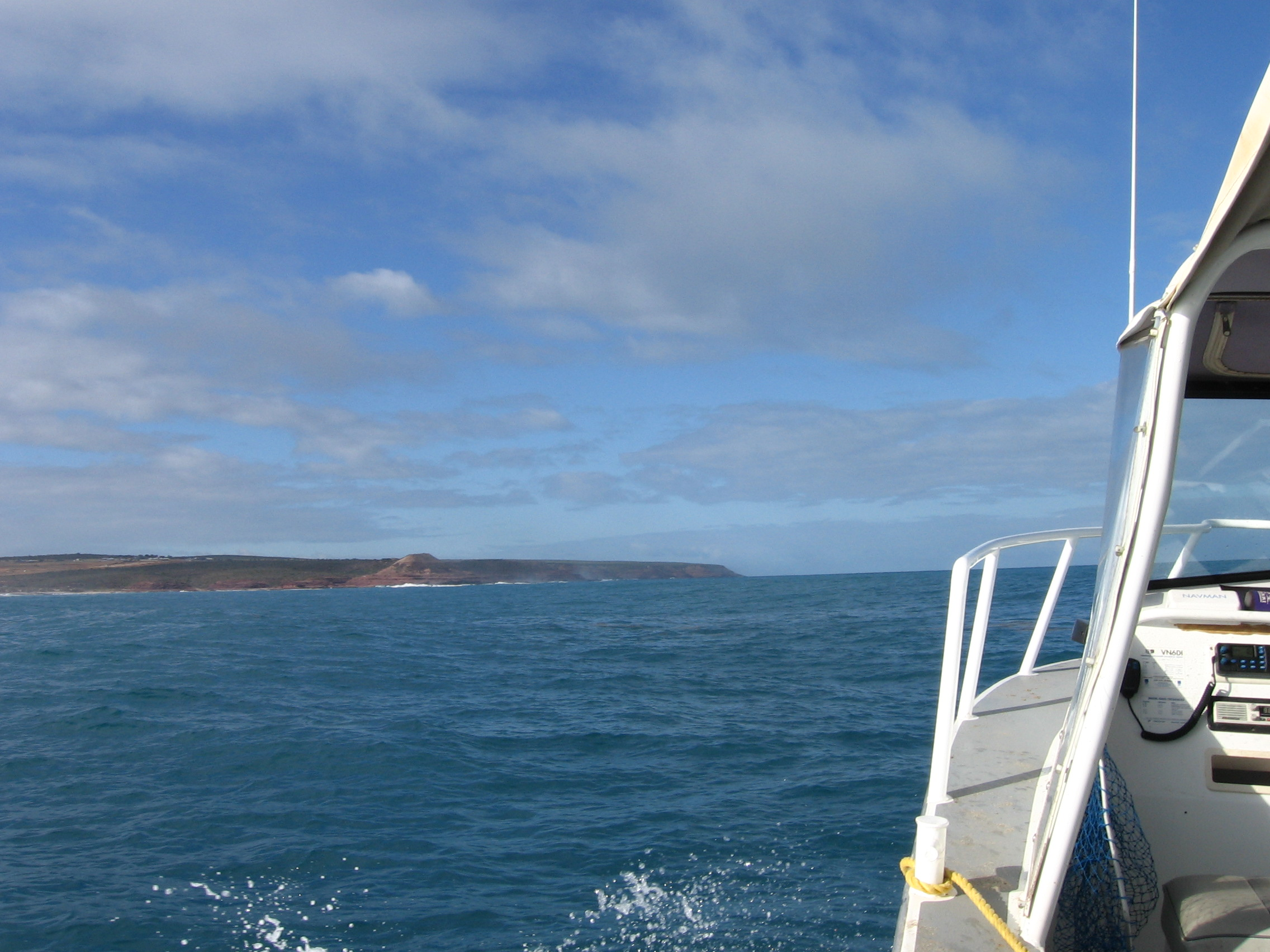
Safety at sea and protection of sensitive areas

== Themes ==
A theme for each World Hydrography Day is determined by the Member States of the International Hydrographic Organization and is intended to promote the importance of hydrography internationally, multilateral cooperation and effective collaboration in data exchange, charting and standards development.

The theme for 2022 is: "Hydrography - contributing to the United Nations Ocean Decade"

Previous themes were:

- 2022: Hydrography - contributing to the United Nations Ocean Decade
- 2021: 100 years of international cooperation in hydrography
- 2020: Hydrography enabling autonomous technologies
- 2019: Hydrographic information driving marine knowledge
- 2018: Bathymetry - the foundation for sustainable seas, oceans and waterways
- 2017: Mapping our seas, oceans and waterways - more important than ever
- 2016: Hydrography - the key to well-managed seas and waterways
- 2015: Our seas and waterways - yet to be fully charted and explored
- 2014: Hydrography - much more than just nautical charts
- 2013: Hydrography - underpinning the Blue Economy
- 2012: International Hydrographic Cooperation - supporting safe navigation
- 2011: Human Resources - The important element to the success of hydrography
- 2010: Hydrographic Services - the essential element for maritime trade
- 2009: Hydrography - Protecting the marine environment
- 2008: Capacity Building, a vital tool to assist the IHO in achieving its mission and objectives
- 2007: Electronic Navigational Charts (ENCs); an essential element of safety at sea and efficient maritime operations

== Activities ==
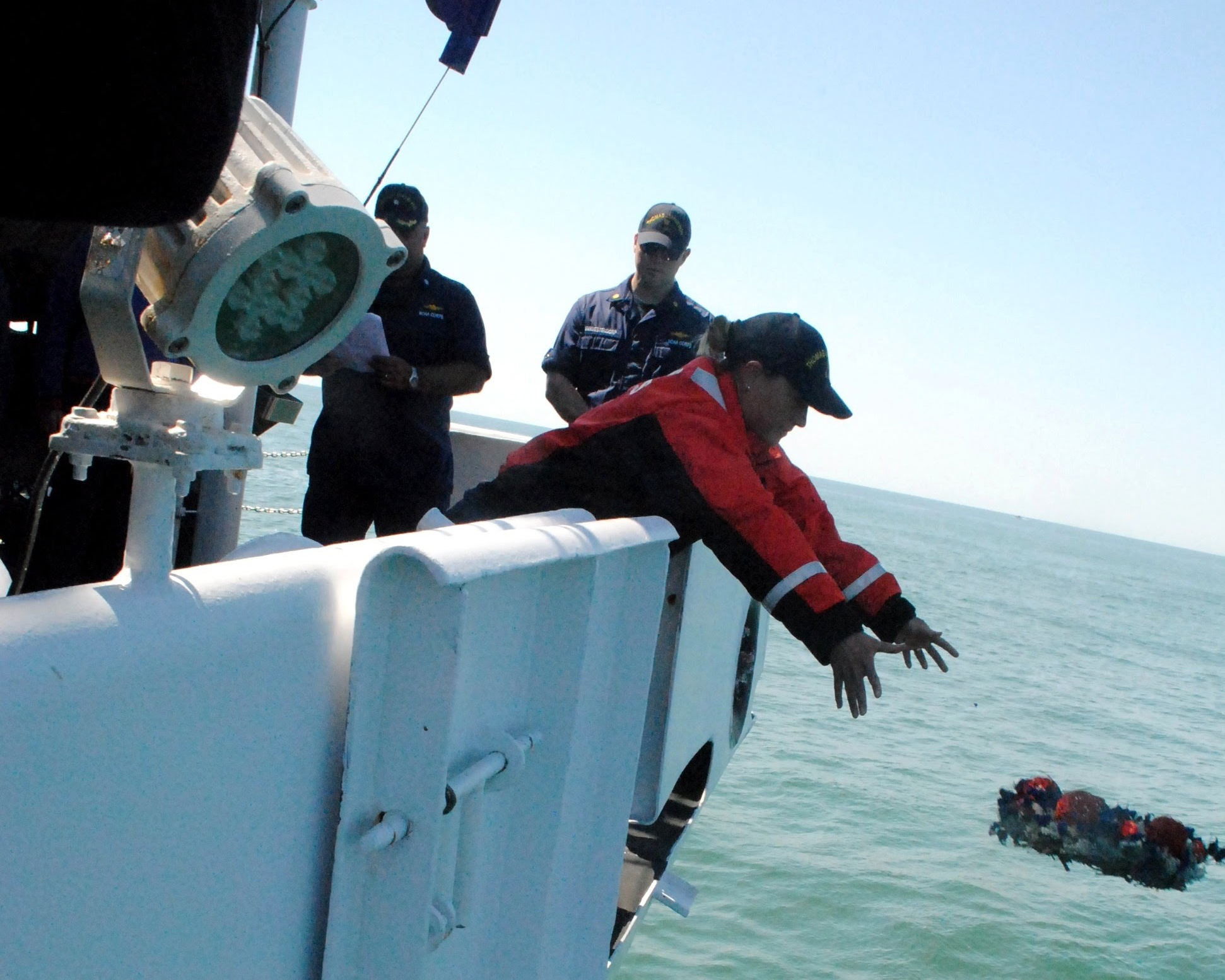
On World Hydrography Day in 2013, a NOAA Commissioned Officer Corps ensign lays a wreath from NOAAS Thomas Jefferson over the waters of the Atlantic Ocean off New Jersey where the United States Coast Survey ship USCS Robert J. Walker sank on 21 June 1860.

Member states of the IHO, as well as international and national hydrographic organisations and services worldwide, engage in a range of activities on or around 21 June each year to mark World Hydrography Day. These include:

- Awards
- Conferences
- Seminars
- Workshops
- Lectures
- Dinners
- Public events
- Demonstrations
- Promotional material

In the United States on 21 June 2013, the National Oceanic and Atmospheric Administration (NOAA) observed World Hydrography Day by holding a wreath-tossing ceremony from the survey ship NOAAS Thomas Jefferson (S 222) on the 153rd anniversary of the sinking of the United States Coast Survey steamer USCS Robert J. Walker, which sank after a collision on 21 June 1860 in the Atlantic Ocean off New Jersey. It was the first commemoration ever held for the 20 men lost in the sinking and an additional crewman who died of his injuries the following day, the largest loss of life in a single incident in the history of NOAA and its ancestor agencies.
