= USCS Varina =

American survey schooner

History

United States
- Name: Varina
- Namesake: Probably Varina Davis (1826-1906), second wife of then-United States Secretary of War Jefferson Davis (1808-1889)
- Builder: Fardy Brothers, Baltimore, Maryland
- Completed: 1854
- Commissioned: 1854
- Decommissioned: 1875

General characteristics
- Type: Survey ship; Schooner
- Length: 91.5 ft (27.9 m)
- Beam: 23.5 ft (7.2 m)
- Draft: 4 ft (1.2 m)
- Propulsion: Steam engine

USCS Varina was a schooner that served as a survey ship in the United States Coast Survey, a predecessor of the United States Coast and Geodetic Survey, from 1854 to 1875.

Varina was built in 1854 by Fardy Brothers at Baltimore, Maryland. She entered Coast Survey service that year.

On more than one occasion, Varina assisted mariners in distress. In December 1856, at the request of the American consul in Havana, Cuba, Varina called at Nassau on New Providence in the Bahama Islands to take on board the crew and steerage passengers of the American ship Julia Howard, which a short time earlier had wrecked on the Bahama Banks, leaving her crew and passengers destitute at New Providence. Varina transported Julia Howard's crew to Havana, and then took her passengers and any crew who preferred it to Pensacola, Florida.

In February 1858, in response to a request for help by the consignees of the schooner Georgia, which had stranded a few days earlier about 30 nautical miles (56 kilometers) from Pensacola, Varina proceeded to the site of the wreck, but the combined efforts of the crews of Varina and Georgia failed to free Georgia.

On the night of 20 January 1858, Varina was at Pensacola, Florida, when a major fire broke out at the United States Army's Fort Pickens. Her hydrographic party, along with men and boats of the Coast Survey steamer USCS Robert J. Walker, promptly assisted in fighting the fire. The next day, Varina's commanding officer received a communication from Captain John Newton of the Army Corps of Engineers, commanding the harbor of Pensacola, acknowledging the important firefighting service rendered by Varina.

On the morning of 21 February 1860, the Russian bark Vesta ran aground on the north breaker at the Ossabaw entrance to the Savannah River off the coast of Georgia and was wrecked. Varina took Vesta's officers and crew aboard and gave them shelter for the night, and Varina's crew was able to assist in ultimately saving Vesta's cargo and stores for Vesta's and the cargo's owners. The Russian vice consul at Savannah acknowledged Varina's assistance to Vesta.

Varina was retired from Coast Survey service in 1875.
