= USCS Robert J. Walker =

Coordinates: 39.27904°N 74.25659°W

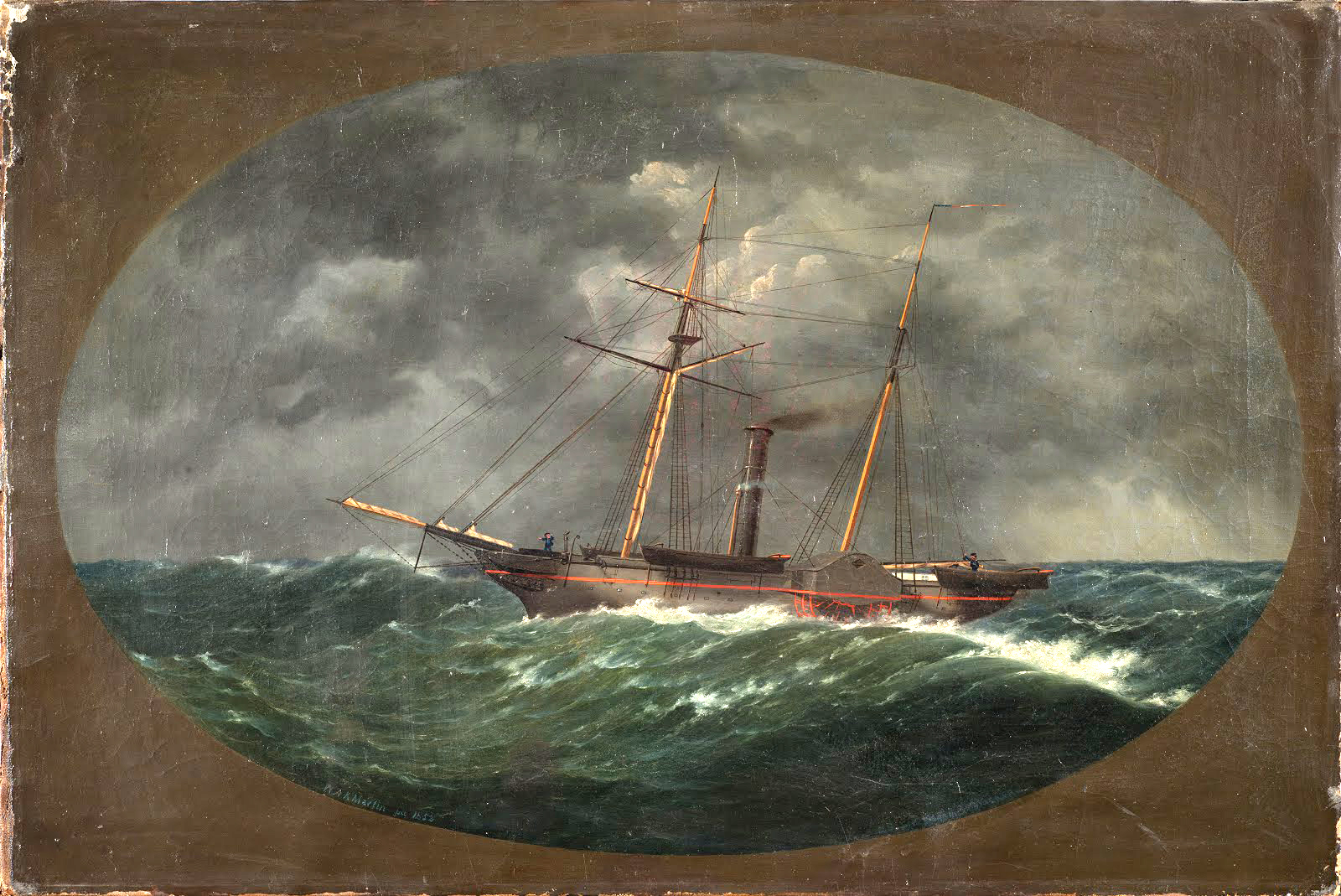
- An 1852 painting of Robert J. Walker by W. A. C. Martin in the collection of the Mariners' Museum in Newport News, Virginia

History

United States
- Name: USRC Robert J. Walker
- Namesake: Robert J. Walker (1801–1869), United States Senator from Mississippi (1836–1845), Secretary of the Treasury (1845–1849), and Governor of Kansas Territory (1857)
- Operator: United States Revenue-Marine
- Awarded: January 1845 or in 1846
- Builder: Tomlinson & Co., Pittsburgh, Pennsylvania
- Cost: US$104,825.53
- Laid down: March 1847
- Launched: 27 November 1847
- Completed: December 1847
- Fate: Transferred to U.S. Coast Survey 11 February 1848

United States
- Name: USCS Robert J. Walker
- Namesake: Previous name retained
- Operator: United States Coast Survey
- Acquired: 11 February 1848
- Fate: Sunk in collision 21 June 1860

General characteristics (U.S. Revenue-Marine)
- Type: Revenue cutter
- Tonnage: 358
- Length: 133 ft (41 m)
- Beam: 31 ft (9.4 m)
- Draft: 9 ft 3 in (2.82 m)
- Propulsion: Steam engine, sidewheel
- Sail plan: Two masts, brigantine rig
- Armament: 32-pounder guns

General characteristics (U.S. Coast Survey)
- Type: Survey ship
- Tonnage: 358
- Length: 133 ft (41 m)
- Beam: 31 ft (9.4 m)
- Draft: 9 ft 3 in (2.82 m)
- Propulsion: Steam engine, sidewheel
- Sail plan: Two masts, brigantine rig
- Robert J. Walker shipwreck and remains
- U.S. National Register of Historic Places
- NRHP reference No.: 14000064
- Added to NRHP: March 19, 2014

USCS Robert J. Walker was a survey ship that served in the United States Coast Survey, a predecessor of the United States Coast and Geodetic Survey, from 1848 until sinking in 1860 after a collision at sea. Her loss resulted in the death of 21 men, the greatest loss of life in single incident ever to befall the National Oceanic and Atmospheric Administration or any of its ancestor agencies. It was added to the National Register of Historic Places on March 19, 2014.

== Construction and acquisition ==
Robert J. Walker was a 358-ton sidewheel paddle steamer built in 1844 by Joseph Tomlinson at Pittsburgh, Pennsylvania, as one of the United States Government's first iron-hulled steamers. She was among eight steamers originally intended for the United States Revenue Marine (renamed the United States Revenue Cutter Service in 1893). Robert J. Walker was one of two experimental sidewheel designs created by United States Navy officer William W. Hunter. She was launched on 27 November 1847. Richard Evans, the commandant of the Revenue Marine, was also her first commanding officer, called her "the finest iron vessel ever built in this country."

== Operational history ==
Robert J. Walker departed Pittsburgh bound for her intended home port at Mobile, Alabama, in December 1847, but never entered her home port and instead was transferred in 1848 to the United States Coast Survey (renamed the United States Coast and Geodetic Survey in 1878). The Revenue Marine had decided that the steamers were too expensive to maintain and operate due to leaky hulls and excessive coal consumption.

In Coast Survey service, Robert J. Walker's first operations involved conducting hydrographic surveys of the waters of Mobile Bay on the coast of Alabama in 1848. Her first Coast Survey commanding officer, Carlile P. Patterson, reported that year on her performance and capabilities compared with those of sailing ships.

Robert J. Walker spent the 1850s charting the waters of the United States Gulf Coast. She suffered deaths among her crew in 1852 when two men — her second and third assistant engineers — died of disease during an epidemic along the Gulf Coast.

On the night of 20 January 1858, Robert J. Walker was at Pensacola, Florida, when a major fire broke out at the United States Army's Fort Pickens. Her men and boats, along with the hydrographic party of the Coast Survey steamer USCS Varina, promptly assisted in fighting the fire. The next day, Robert J. Walker's commanding officer received a communication from Captain John Newton of the United States Army Corps of Engineers, commanding the harbor of Pensacola, acknowledging the important firefighting service rendered by Robert J. Walker.

== Loss ==
Early on the morning of 21 June 1860, Robert J. Walker had completed her most recent hydrographic survey work in the Gulf of Mexico and was bound from Norfolk, Virginia, to New York City in rough seas with a crew of 72 and the wife of the executive officer on board. At 02:20, a commercial schooner, identified as Fanny by Robert J. Walker's crew, collided with her. She sank in less than 30 minutes in the Atlantic Ocean off the coast of New Jersey approximately 12 nautical miles (22 km; 14 mi) southeast of Absecon Inlet Light, with a loss of 20 men, as well the death of a 21st crewman who died of his injuries the following day. It was the greatest disaster ever to occur in any ancestor agency of what later became the National Oceanic and Atmospheric Administration (NOAA). The commercial schooner R. G. Porter came to Robert J. Walker's assistance, recovered her survivors, searched for her missing men, and brought the survivors into May's Landing, New Jersey, later in the day. Fanny, meanwhile, arrived at Cape May, New Jersey, that day with damage consistent with a collision with Robert J. Walker.

With the American Civil War approaching, no inquiry into the cause of the Robert J. Walker disaster ever took place, and the Coast Survey did not pursue the matter of Fanny's presumed culpability in the sinking. No official ceremony in honor of the lost crewmen was held.

== Discovery of wreck and commemoration ==
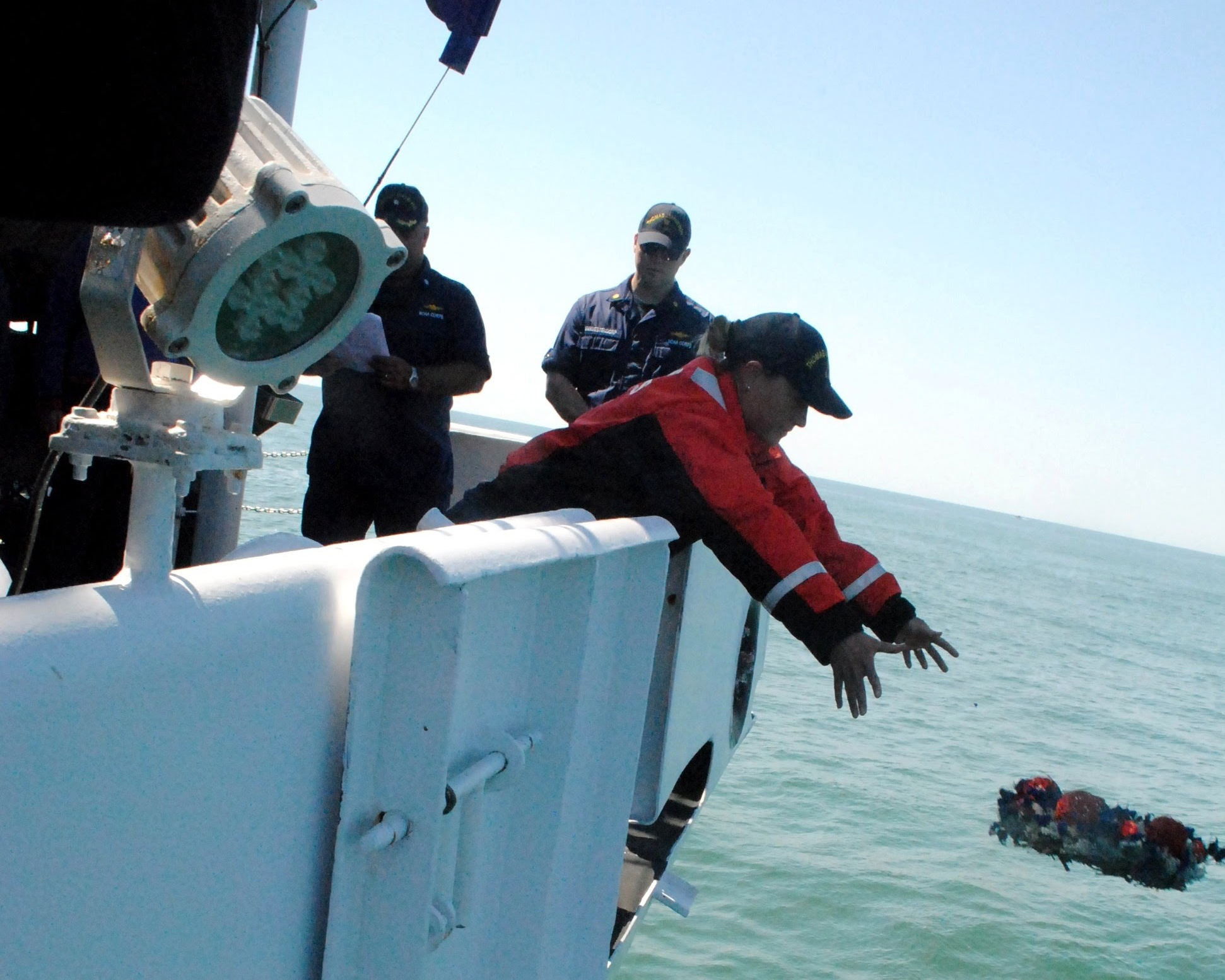
On 21 June 2013, Ensign Eileen Pye, NOAA Corps, lays a wreath from the survey ship NOAAS Thomas Jefferson over the waters where Robert J. Walker sank on 21 June 1860.

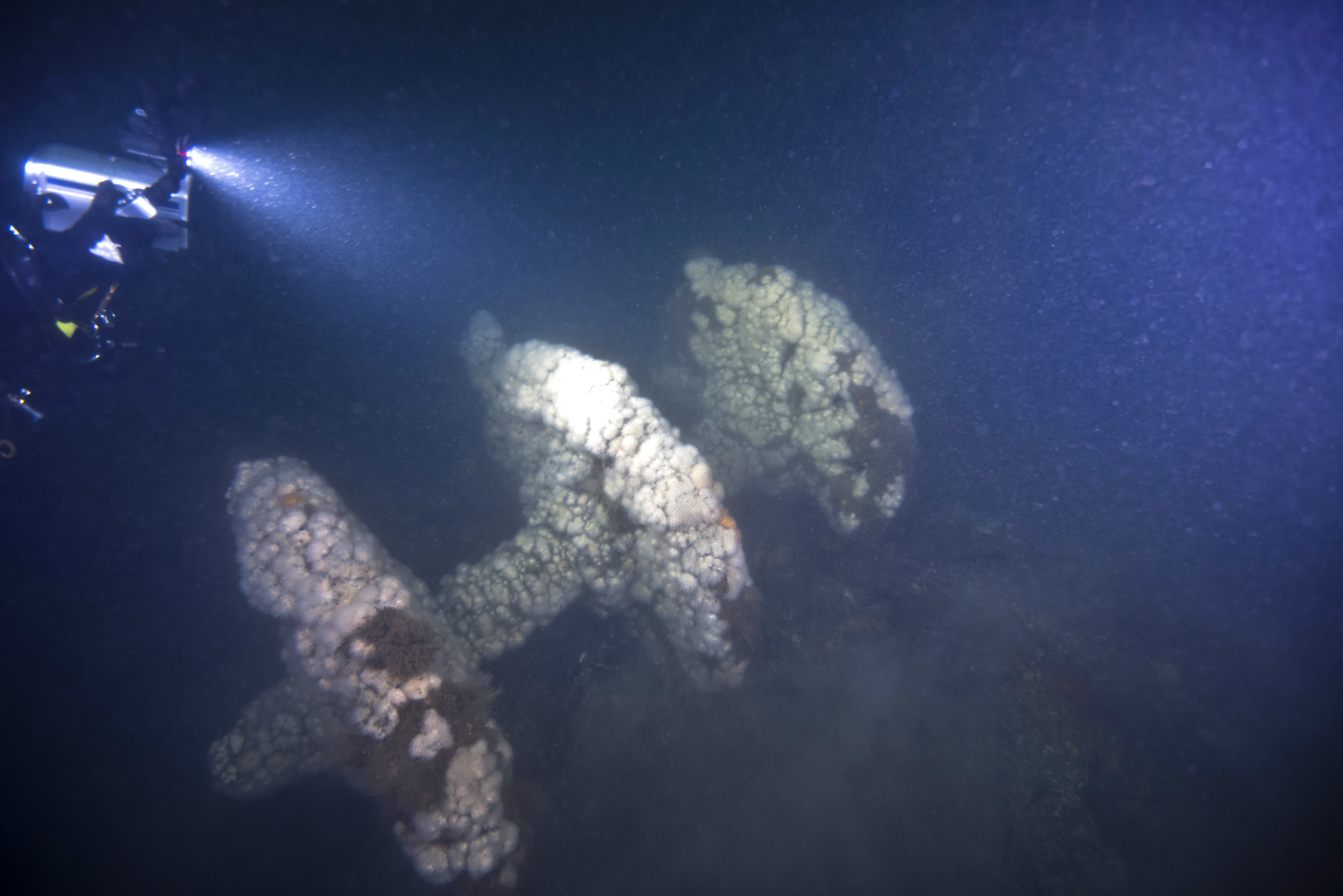
The sidewheel flange of Robert J. Walker on the bottom of the Atlantic Ocean, photographed by a National Oceanic and Atmospheric Administration dive team on 23 June 2013.

A commercial fisherman found the wreck of Robert J. Walker in the 1970s, 10 nautical miles (19 km; 12 mi) off the New Jersey coast in 85 feet (26 m) of water, and divers visited it regularly thereafter, but it remained unidentified until 2013, when NOAA announced that a positive identification had been made. On 21 June 2013, the NOAA survey ship NOAAS Thomas Jefferson, operating in the area to conduct hydrographic surveys for navigation safety after Hurricane Sandy, held a wreath-tossing ceremony in the general area of the wreck to honor Robert J. Walker's dead on the 153rd anniversary of her sinking – the first official commemorative ceremony ever held for them – then collected survey data using multibeam sonar and sidescan sonar later in the day that established with 80 percent certainty the identity and location of the wreck. A NOAA Maritime Heritage dive team, also in the area for post-Hurricane Sandy operations, confirmed the wreck's identity on 23 June 2013. NOAA used several key clues to confirm the identity of the ship including the size and layout of the iron hull, unique engines, and rectangular portholes.

After the wreck's identification, NOAA made no plans to raise it. The Maritime Heritage Office of NOAA's Office of National Marine Sanctuaries also opted not to nominate it for consideration as a National Marine Sanctuary — concerned that a sanctuary designation would place too many restrictions on recreational diving at the wreck site by limiting it to researchers — and the Maritime Heritage Office instead nominated the wreck site for inclusion in the National Register of Historic Places (NRHP). The National Park Service included it in the NRHP on 19 March 2014, and NOAA announced its inclusion in the NRHP on 2 April 2014. NOAA also made plans to work with the New Jersey diving community to increase understanding of the wreck.
