= USS Littlehales (AGSC-15) =

YF-852-class of the United States Navy

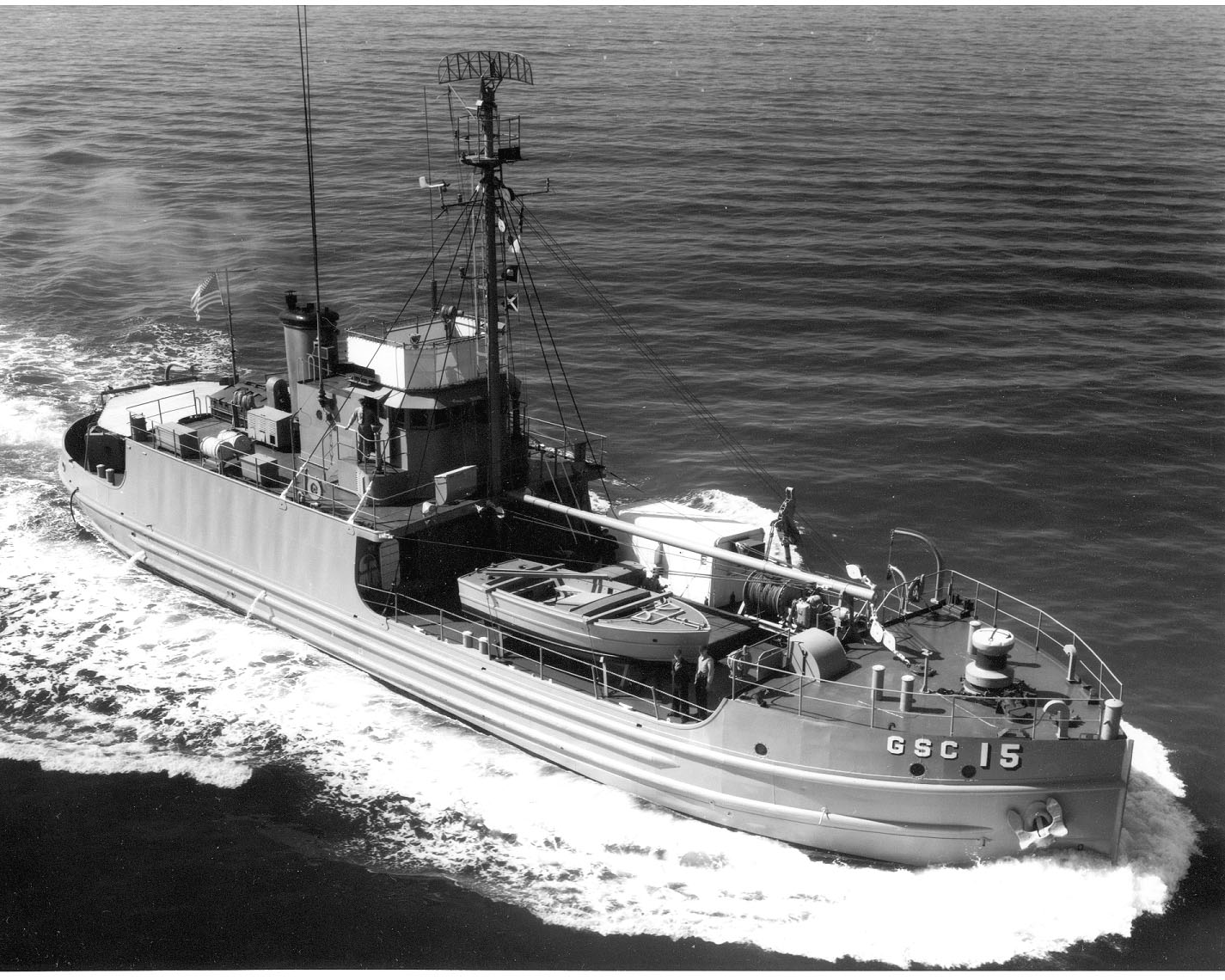
- USS Littlehales

History

United States
- Name: YF-854
- Builder: Erie Concrete & Steel Co.
- Laid down: 31 May 1945
- Launched: 28 August 1945
- Commissioned: 17 December 1952
- Renamed: Littlehales
- Namesake: George W. Littlehales
- Decommissioned: 1 April 1968
- Stricken: 20 February 1968
- Identification: Callsign: NHPM; Hull number: AGSC-15
- Honors and awards: See Awards

General characteristics
- Class & type: YF-852-class lighter
- Displacement: 300 t (295 long tons)
- Length: 132 ft 6 in (40.39 m)
- Beam: 31 ft 0 in (9.45 m)
- Draft: 9 ft 0 in (2.74 m)
- Installed power: 2 × shafts; 3 × rudders; 600 bhp (450 kW)
- Propulsion: 2 × Union diesel engines
- Speed: 10 kn (19 km/h; 12 mph)
- Complement: 19 crew
- Sensors & processing systems: 1 × AN/SPS-10 surface-search radar

USS YF-854 was an American YF-852-class covered lighter built in 1945. She was later commissioned by the United States Navy and renamed USS Littlehales (AGSC-15) in 1959, serving as a coastal survey ship.

The ship is named after an American oceanographer George Washington Littlehales, an American chairman of the Section of Physical Oceanography, American Geophysical Union, and as vice president of the Section of Oceanography, International Union of Geodesy and Geophysics.

== Awards ==
- National Defense Service Medal
