= MIND Technology, Inc. =

Marketer of geophysical and other equipment

Mitcham Industries, Inc.
- Company type: Public
- Traded as: Nasdaq: MIND; Russell Microcap Component
- Industry: Technology – Scientific & Technical Instruments
- Founded: 1987; 39 years ago
- Headquarters: Huntsville, Texas, U.S.
- Key people: Billy F. Mitcham Jr. (CEO); Guy M. Malden (co-CEO, Executive vice president); Robert P. Capps (co-CEO, Principal Accounting Officer) (Dec 31, 2012)
- Revenue: $ 96.86M (Oct 31, 2013)
- Number of employees: 184 (Oct 31, 2013)
- Website: mitchamindustries.com

Mitcham Industries, Inc. is a company founded in 1987, and is based in Huntsville, Texas. The company markets geophysical and other equipment to seismic data acquisition contractors conducting surveys on land, marsh, and marine areas, both shallow and deep water. There are mainly two segments operating in the company, namely an Equipment Leasing segment (for the oil and gas industry) and an Equipment Manufacturing segment. In October 2011, the Company opened a new logistics and repair facility in Budapest, Hungary, and three months later, it opened two new subsidiaries, namely Mitcham Europe Ltd. and Mitcham Marine Leasing Pte Ltd. On September 21, 2015, Founder and CEO Billy F. Mitcham Jr. died, and Guy M. Malden and Robert P. Capps were installed as Co-Chief Executive Officers.

== Operations ==
The leasing business of Mitcham Industries is undertaken by its subsidiaries, namely MII, Mitcham Canada ULC (MCL), Seismic Asia Pacific Pty Ltd. (SAP), Mitcham Seismic Eurasia LLC (MSE) and Absolute Equipment Solutions, Inc. (AES). The manufacturing business of the company is undertaken by the Seamap (UK) Ltd (Seamap UK) and Seamap Pte. Ltd) subsidiaries.

In August 2013, Mitcham Industries entered a three-year, $50.0 million syndicated revolving credit facility with HSBC Bank USA, N.A., replacing First Victoria National Bank.

In October 2011, the company established a new warehouse, logistics and repair facility in Budapest, Hungary to facilitate the Eastern European market.

In June 2011, the company joined the Russell 3000 Index after for U.S. small-cap stocks.

In March 2011, the company purchased 3000 channels of Sercel's UNITE cable-free land acquisition system, following the purchase of 7,500 channels in September 2010.

In December 2007, the company completed the acquisition of all intellectual property rights related to the source controller software utilized in its GunLink product line by its Seamap unit from Tanglesolve Instrumentation Ltd. for about $1.5 million.

In July 2005, Mitcham Industries completed the acquisition of Seamap International Holdings Pte Ltd's three subsidiaries: Seamap Inc., Seamap (UK) Ltd and Seamap Pte Ltd for about $6.5 million and an earn-out component up to an additional $2 million. In November the same year, Seamap completed the trial of its new GunLink 3000 Hydrophone Acquisition and Gun Control System, providing enhanced source control and reducing diameter umbilicals.

== Products & Services ==
The equipment leasing segment provides short-term leasing of seismic equipment to seismic data acquisition contractors and oil field service providers. Its lease pool equipment sales includes seismic recording land channels, geophones and cables, air guns, streamer positioning equipment, and downhole equipment lease pool, heli-pickers and related equipment. In addition, the company also provides systems integration, hardware and software maintenance. Its Seamap Equipment Sales division markets products to the marine seismic industry, including GunLink seismic source acquisition and control systems, BuoyLink RGPS tracking systems.
