= Shōhei Takada =

Japanese shogi player (born 1962)

- Native name: 高田尚平
- Born: June 21, 1962 (age 63)
- Hometown: Tokyo Metropolis

Career
- Achieved professional status: April 1, 1989 (aged 26)
- Badge Number: 191
- Rank: 7 dan
- Retired: August 9, 2019 (30 years)
- Teacher: Mitsuyuki Aramaki

Websites
- JSA profile page

Shōhei Takada (高田 尚平, Takada Shōhei; June 21, 1962) is a Japanese retired professional shogi player who achieved the rank of 7-dan.

== Shogi professional ==
=== Theoretical contributions ===
Takada is the inventor of the Takada System.

Takada vs Suzuki 1995
☖ pieces in hand: –

9	8	7	6	5	4	3	2	1
香	桂	銀	金					香	1
	王			金	銀				2
	歩	歩	歩	歩		桂		角	3
歩						飛		歩	4
	歩	歩	歩		歩		歩		5
歩			角	歩					6
			銀	銀	歩	歩	歩	歩	7
	飛	玉		金		金			8
香	桂						桂	香	9

☗ pieces in hand: –
after 39 moves
