= Nanou ASMR =

Belgian ASMR internet personality (born 2007)

Nanou Philips
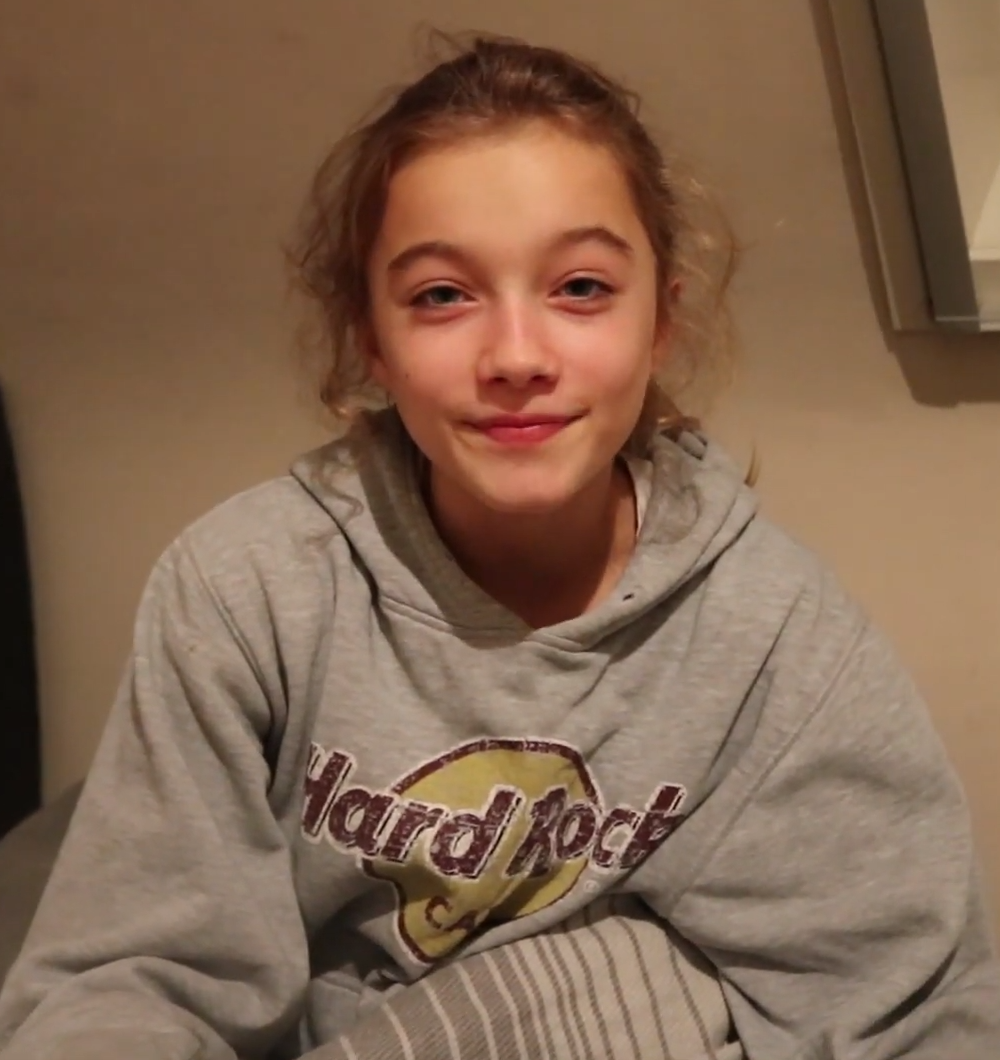
- Philips in 2018
- Born: June 21, 2007 (age 19); Damme, West Flanders, Belgium

Instagram information
- Pages: Nanou; N A N O U P H I L I P S
- Years active: 2017–present
- Genres: ASMR; vlogging; role-play
- Followers: 21.8 thousand (Nanou); 85.1 thousand (N A N O U P H I L I P S)

TikTok information
- Pages: Nanou ASMR; Nanou Philips
- Years active: 2020–present
- Genres: ASMR; vlogging; role-play
- Followers: 1.8 million (Nanou ASMR); 121.3 thousand (Nanou Philips)

Twitch information
- Channel: NanouASMR
- Years active: 2023–present
- Genres: ASMR; role-play
- Followers: 27.5 thousand

YouTube information
- Channels: Nanou ASMR; Nanou ASMR +; Nanou Philips (Nederlands); Nanou Philips
- Years active: 2016–present
- Genres: ASMR; role-play; vlogging
- Subscribers: 1.9 million (Nanou ASMR ) 437 thousand (Nanou ASMR +); 54.1 thousand (Nanou Philips (Nederlands)); 31.6 thousand (Nanou Philips)
- Views: 559,226,404 (Nanou ASMR); 111,953,696(Nanou ASMR +); 2,972,277 (Nanou Philips (Nederlands)); 1,914,191 (Nanou Philips); Total: 676,066,568
- Last updated: January 21, 2026

Nanou Philips (born June 21, 2007) is a Belgian social media personality. Under the online handle Nanou ASMR, she produces ASMR content, which she is mostly known for, on YouTube, TikTok, and Instagram, in addition to other platforms. Besides ASMR, Philips also uploads vlogging content. Having done content creation since mid-childhood, she has amassed a large following online from her ASMR and vlogging content.

== Biography ==
Nanou Philips was born on June 21, 2007, in the Flemish city of Damme, West Flanders, Belgium, the daughter of Mario Philips and Isabelle Decramer Philips. She is the youngest in her family and has three brothers, Simon, Cédric, and Noah. She, along with her brothers, were homeschooled. As a child, she had a keen interest in acting and presenting. Her brother Noah also has an interest in film and video, and this led to her asking him to make videos of her to put online. Although Noah initially was skeptical of making videos featuring his sister, thinking that she would get bullied for it, the subsequent success of her online made him support the endeavor.

She discovered an interest in ASMR around this time via being recommended ASMR videos on YouTube, swiftly becoming obsessed with it. She began incorporating it into her videos from 2019 onwards, under a new channel dubbed "Nanou ASMR." Initially starting her channel as a joke, by the time she turned 13 in 2020, Philips had already accumulated 200,000 subscribers on her YouTube channel. Her ASMR content, which has led to her becoming known as the "whisper girl," (Note: Dutch: fluistermeisje) includes elements of role-play. Philips creates soothing sounds from things such as keyboards to cleaning out a plastic ear. Her mother Isabelle serves as her de facto manager, with Noah filming and editing, and Cédric managing the "behind-the scenes" process.

In 2023, she signed a partnership with Twitch. As of January 2026, she has nearly 2 million followers on TikTok and YouTube individually, with her also having 22 thousand on Instagram and 27.5 thousand on Twitch. Additionally, Philips has various social media handles devoted to vlogging on the first three of those sites, in both Flemish and English.

Philips, building on her online success, has also embarked upon other endeavors; in 2019, she debuted her own clothing line, TWLV (named after her then-age of 12). She and her brothers (namely Cédric) launched a sustainable clothing line in 2020, dubbed Oceans. The brand sells swim trunks made from recycled plastic from the world's oceans. In August 2021, the municipal police of Knokke-Heist and Damme in the Arrondissement of Bruges launched an anti-cybercrime campaign, with Philips serving as the face of the program, alongside her mother. She's appeared in an advertisement for the popular Belgian brand Kipling, promoting their school bags, however, her mother states that they generally avoid sponsorships to keep the video-making process "fun." She was one of a variety of West Flemish influencers to come out and oppose fellow Belgian YouTuber Acid's court-ordered ban on video-making in 2025.
