= George W. Littlehales =

American oceanographer and civil engineer

George Washington Littlehales
- Born: October 14, 1860; Pottsville, Pennsylvania
- Died: August 12, 1943 (aged 82); Washington, D.C.
- Burial place: Rock Creek Cemetery
- Military career
- Allegiance: United States of America
- Branch: United States Navy
- Service years: 1883–1885

George Washington Littlehales (October 14, 1860, in Pottsville, Pennsylvania – August 12, 1943) was an American oceanographer and civil engineer, known for his work with the United States Hydrographic Office.

== Biography ==
Littlehales graduated from the United States Naval Academy on June 9, 1883, but resigned from the Navy two years later to join the United States Hydrographic Office, with which he was associated until his retirement. There he served as Chief of the Division of Chart Construction and Chief of the Research Division, and contributed to the design of the non-magnetic ship Carnegie.

He compiled many publications in navigation, terrestrial magnetism, and oceanography, and served as chairman of the Section of Physical Oceanography, American Geophysical Union, and as vice president of the Section of Oceanography, International Union of Geodesy and Geophysics.

Littlehales was a member of the Philosophical Society of Washington (and its president during 1905), the American Society of Naval Engineers, and the Washington Academy of Sciences.

From 1919 until retirement, Littlehales represented the United States at numerous hydrographic congresses and councils throughout the world.

== Death ==
Littlehales died on August 12, 1943, in Washington, D.C.

== Namesakes ==
Three U.S. Navy hydrographic survey ships have been named in his honor. The most recent was USNS Littlehales (T-AGS-52) serving 1992–2003 before being transferred to the National Oceanic and Atmospheric Administration (NOAA) and renamed.
