= Karl Zittel =

German theologian

Karl Zittel (21 June 1802, Schmieheim – 28 August 1871, Karlsruhe) was a German theologian, who was a prominent figure in 19th century Liberal Protestantism. He was the father of paleontologist Karl Alfred von Zittel (1839–1904).

He studied theology at the University of Jena, and in 1834 became a pastor in Bahlingen. From 1842 onward, he was a member of the second chamber in the Baden Ständeversammlung, where in September 1845, he made a proposal in favor of Religionsfreiheit (freedom of religion), a motion that gained notoriety at the time. In 1848 he became a pastor in Heidelberg, and during the same year, became a member of the Frankfurt Parliament as a representative of Karlsruhe.

He was co-founder of the Protestantenvereins (German Protestant Association), of which, he was a committee member up until his death in 1871. From 1857 to 1865, he was an editor of the popular journal Der Sonntagabend.

== Principal works ==
- Zustände der evangelisch-protestantischen Kirche in Baden, 1843 – Conditions of the Evangelical Protestant Church in Baden.
- Motion auf Gestattung einer Religionsfreiheit, 1846 – Action for clearance of religious freedom.
- Der Bekenntnissstreit in der protestantischen Kirche, 1852 – The commitment dispute in the Protestant church.
- Das Badische Concordat und die Conferenz in Durlach, (with Ludwig Häusser and Daniel Schenkel) 1860 – The Baden Concordat and the Durlach Conference.
