= Side-scan sonar =

Tool for seafloor mapping

Diagram of sidescan sonar

Side-scan sonar (also sometimes called side scan sonar, sidescan sonar, side imaging sonar, side-imaging sonar and bottom classification sonar) is a category of sonar system that is used to efficiently create an image of large areas of the sea floor.

== Uses ==
Side-scan sonar is used to image large areas of the seafloor quickly. Applications include surveys for marine archaeology, shipwreck hunting, search and recovery (SAR), and environmental monitoring. In conjunction with seafloor samples, it is able to provide an understanding of the differences in material and texture type of the seabed. Side-scan sonar imagery is also a commonly used tool to detect debris items and other obstructions on the seafloor that may be hazardous to shipping or to seafloor installations by the oil and gas industry. In addition, the status of pipelines and cables on the seafloor can be investigated using side-scan sonar. Side-scan data are frequently acquired along with bathymetric soundings and sub-bottom profiler data, thus providing a glimpse of the shallow structure of the seabed. Side-scan sonar is also used for fisheries research, dredging operations and environmental studies. It also has military applications including mine detection.

== How it works ==
Side-scan uses a sonar device that emits conical or fan-shaped pulses down toward the seafloor across a wide angle perpendicular to the path of the sensor through the water, which may be towed from a surface vessel or submarine (called a “towfish”), or mounted on the ship's hull. The intensity of the acoustic reflections from the seafloor of this fan-shaped beam is recorded in a series of cross-track slices. When stitched together along the direction of motion, these slices form an image of the sea bottom within the swath (coverage width) of the beam. The sound frequencies used in side-scan sonar usually range from 100 to 500 kHz; higher frequencies yield better resolution but less range.

== History ==
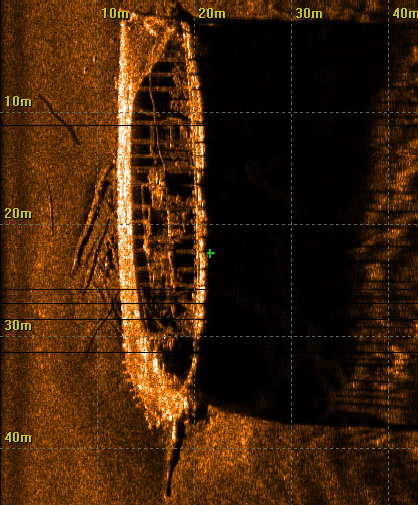
Side-scan sonar image of shipwreck "Aid" in Estonia

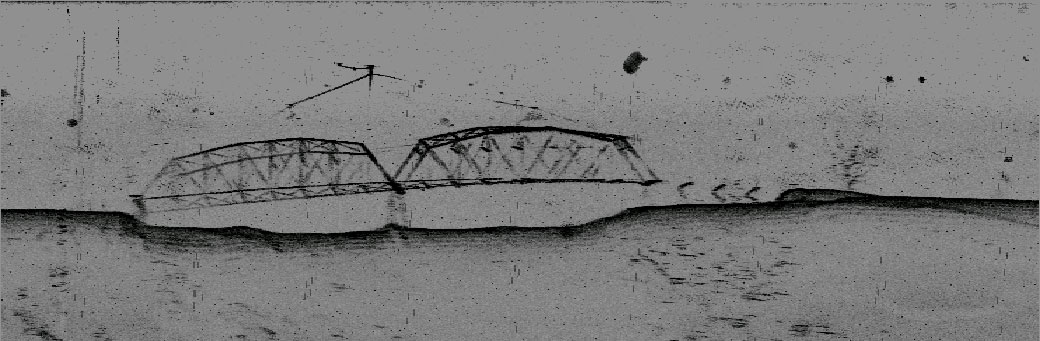
Side-scan sonar image of submerged bridge at the bottom of Lake Murray in South Carolina

=== Technology ===
The earliest side-scan sonars used a single conical-beam transducer. Next, units were made with two transducers to cover both sides. The transducers were either contained in one hull-mounted package or with two packages on either side of the vessel. Next the transducers evolved to fan-shaped beams to produce a better "sonogram" or sonar image. In order to get closer to the bottom in deep water the side-scan transducers were placed in a "tow fish" and pulled by a tow cable.

Up until the mid-1980s, commercial side scan images were produced on paper records. The early paper records were produced with a sweeping plotter that burned the image into a scrolling paper record. Later plotters allowed for the simultaneous plotting of position and ship motion information onto the paper record. In the late 1980s, commercial systems using the newer, cheaper computer systems developed digital scan-converters that could mimic more cheaply the analog scan converters used by the military systems to produce TV and computer displayed images of the scan, and store them on video tape. Currently data is stored on computer hard drives or solid-state media - the data is typically displayed in grayscale or color images, known as side scan sonograms, which provide a visual representation of the underwater environment.

=== Military application ===
One of the inventors of side-scan sonar was German scientist, Dr. Julius Hagemann, who was brought to the US after World War II and worked at the US Navy Mine Defense Laboratory, Panama City, FL from 1947 until his death in 1964. His work is documented in US Patent 4,197,591 which was first disclosed in Aug 1958, but remained classified by the US Navy until it was finally issued in 1980. Experimental side-scan sonar systems were made during the 1950s in laboratories including Scripps Institution of Oceanography and Hudson Laboratories and by Dr. Harold Edgerton at MIT.

Military side-scan sonars were made in the 1950s by Westinghouse. Advanced systems were later developed and built for special military purposes, such as to find H-Bombs lost at sea or to find a lost Russian submarine, at the Westinghouse facility in Annapolis up through the 1990s. This group also produced the first and only working Angle Look Sonar that could trace objects while looking under the vehicle.

=== Commercial application ===
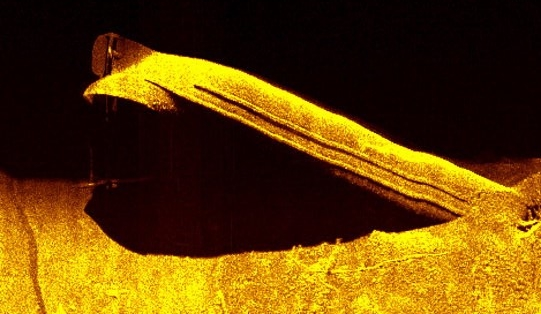
side-scan image of the freighter Choctaw

The first commercial side-scan system was the Kelvin Hughes "Transit Sonar", a converted echo-sounder with a single-channel, pole-mounted, fan-beam transducer introduced around 1960. In 1963 Dr. Harold Edgerton, Edward Curley, and John Yules used a conical-beam 12 kHz side-scan sonar to find the sunken Vineyard Lightship in Buzzards Bay, Massachusetts. A team led by Martin Klein at Edgerton, Germeshausen & Grier (later E.G. & G., Inc.) developed the first successful towed, dual-channel commercial side-scan sonar system from 1963 to 1966. Martin Klein is generally considered to be the "father" of commercial side-scan sonar. In 1967, Edgerton used Klein's sonar to help Alexander McKee find Henry VIII's flagship Mary Rose. That same year Klein used the sonar to help archaeologist George Bass find a 2000-year-old ship off the coast of Turkey. In 1968 Klein founded Klein Associates (now KLEIN - A MIND Technology Business) and continued to work on improvements including the first commercial high frequency (500 kHz) systems and the first dual-frequency side-scan sonars, and the first combined side-scan and sub-bottom profiling sonar. In 1985, Charles Mazel of Klein Associates (now Klein Marine Systems, Inc.) produced the first commercial side-scan sonar training videos and the first Side Scan Sonar Training Manual and two oceanographers found the wreck of the RMS Titanic.

For surveying large areas, the GLORIA sidescan sonar was developed by Marconi Underwater Systems and the Institute of Oceanographic Sciences (IOS) for NERC. GLORIA stands for Geological Long Range Inclined Asdic. It was used by the US Geological Survey and the IOS in the UK to obtain images of continental shelves worldwide. It operated at relatively low frequencies to obtain long range. Like most side-scan sonars, the GLORIA instrument is towed behind a ship. GLORIA has a ping rate of two per minute, and detects returns from a range of up to 22 km either side of the sonar fish.

== See also ==
- Aperture synthesis – Mixing signals from many telescopes to produce images with high angular resolution
- Beamforming – Signal processing technique for sensor arrays
- Phased array – Array of antennas creating a steerable beam
- Sonar 2087 – Towed array sonar
- Synthetic aperture sonar – Form of sonar using post-processing of sonar data
