= Bowditch =

Bowditch may refer to:

== Books ==
- Bowditch's American Practical Navigator, an encyclopedia of navigation

== People ==
- Ben Bowditch (born 1984), English footballer
- Brian Bowditch (born 1961), British mathematician
- Charles Pickering Bowditch (1842 – 1921), grandson of Nathaniel Bowditch, brother of Henry Pickering Bowditch, American archaeologist and specialist in Mayan linguistics
- Clare Bowditch (born 1975), Australian musician
- Dean Bowditch (born 1986), English footballer
- Henry Ingersoll Bowditch (1808–1892), American abolitionist, physician, public reformer
- Henry Pickering Bowditch (1840–1911), American physiologist, Dean of Harvard Medical School
- Ian Bowditch (1939–2008), Australian fencer
- Nathaniel Bowditch (1773–1838), American mathematician and author of Bowditch's American Practical Navigator
- Steve Bowditch (born 1955), Australian squash player
- Steven Bowditch (born 1983), Australian professional golfer
- William Ingersoll Bowditch (1819–1909), American lawyer, abolitionist, suffragist, writer

== Ships ==
- USCS Bowditch, a United States Coast Survey schooner in service from 1854 to 1874
- USNS Bowditch, the name of more than one United States Navy Military Sealift Command ship
- USS Bowditch (AG-30), later AGS-4, a United States Navy survey ship in commission from 1940 to 1947

== Others ==
- Bowditch (crater), a lunar crater
- Bowditch Field, sports venue in Massachusetts, United States
- Bowditch School, historic school in Boston, Massachusetts, United States
