= Memorial Hall (Harvard University) =

Building in Cambridge, Massachusetts

- Memorial Hall, Harvard University
- U.S. National Register of Historic Places
- U.S. National Historic Landmark
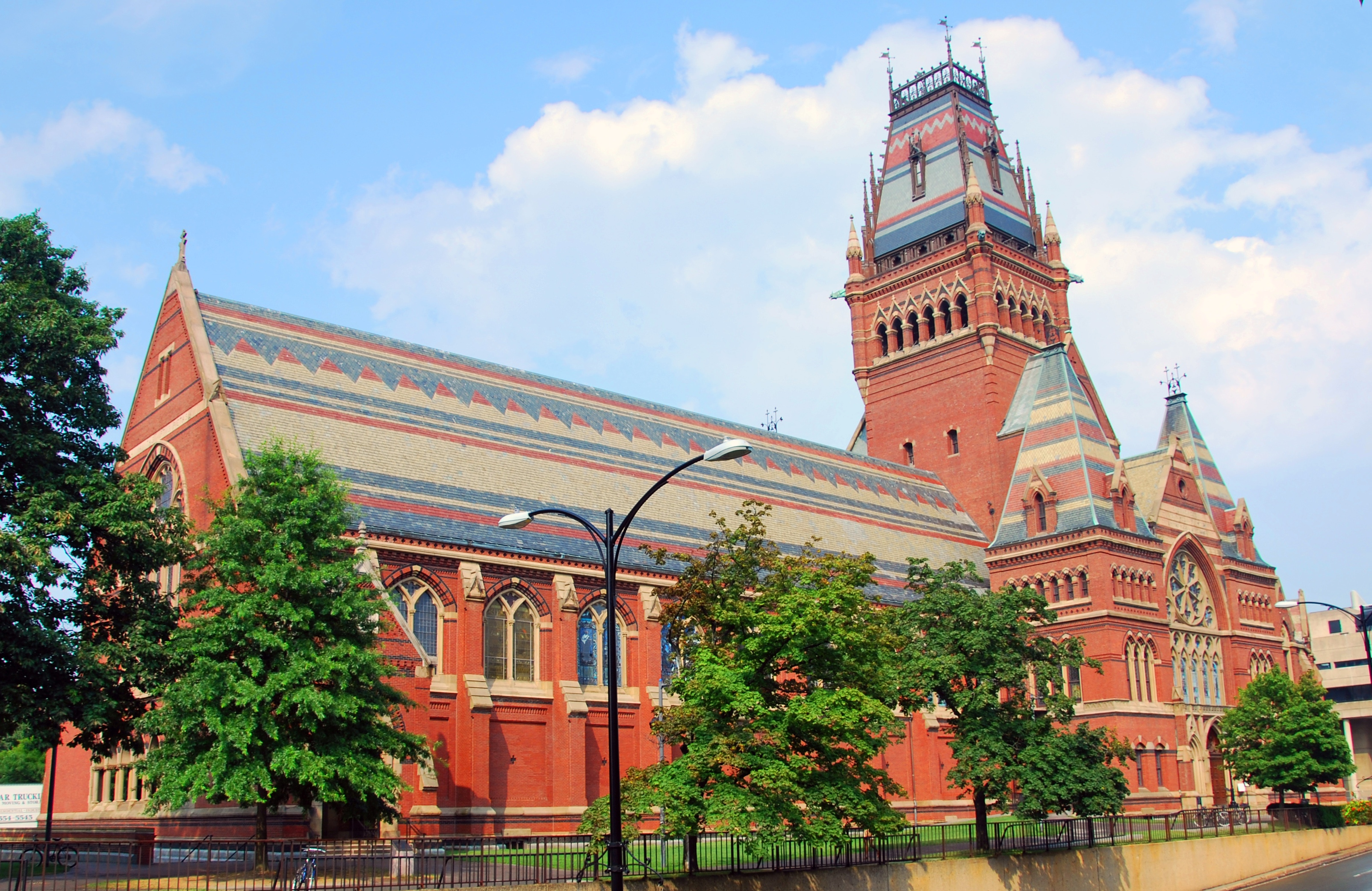
- View from southwest showing Annenberg Hall (foreground) and Memorial Transept (right). Sanders Theatre is out of view beyond Memorial Transept.
- Location: Cambridge, Massachusetts, U.S.
- Coordinates: 42°22′33.2″N 71°6′53.7″W
- Built: 1870–1877
- Architect: William Robert Ware, Henry Van Brunt
- Architectural style: Neo-Gothic
- NRHP reference No.: 70000685

Memorial Hall, immediately north of Harvard Yard on the Harvard University campus in Cambridge, Massachusetts, is a High Victorian Gothic building honoring Harvard University alumni's sacrifices in defending the Union during the American Civil War‍—‌"a symbol of Boston's commitment to the Unionist cause and the abolitionist movement in America".

Built on a former playing field known as the Delta, the structure was intended to be imposing.

It was described by Henry James as having

three main divisions: one of them a theater, for academic ceremonies; another a vast refectory, covered with a timbered roof, hung about with portraits and lighted by stained windows, like the halls of the colleges of Oxford; and the third, the most interesting, a chamber high, dim and severe, consecrated to the sons of the university who fell in the long Civil War.

James's "three divisions" are Sanders Theatre, Annenberg Hall (formerly Alumni Hall or the Great Hall), and Memorial Transept. Beneath Annenberg Hall, Loker Commons offers a number of student facilities.

== Conception and construction ==
Memorial Hall is, in the opinion of the President and Fellows, the most valuable gift the University has ever received, with respect alike to cost, daily usefulness, and moral significance.

— President's Report for 1877–78

This happy commemorative creation of the Union ... the great bristling brick Valhalla of the early "seventies," that house of honor and of hospitality which [dispenses] laurels to the dead and dinners to the living.

— Henry James (1905)

A huge Victorian Gothic barn.

— Life (1941)

Between 1865 and 1868, an alumni "Committee of Fifty" raised $370,000 (equal to one-twelfth of Harvard's entire endowment at the time) toward a new building in memory of Harvard men who had fought for the Union in the American Civil War, particularly the 136 dead (Note: Harvard University (1949). "Memorial Hall". Education, bricks and mortar: Harvard buildings and their contribution to the advancement of learning. The University. p. 81. ISBN 9780674238855.)‍—‌a "Hall of Alumni in which students and graduates might be inspired by the pictured and sculpted presence of her founders, benefactors, faculty, presidents, and most distinguished sons". When, about the same time, a $40,000 bequest was received from Charles Sanders (class of 1802) for "a hall or theatre to be used on [any] public occasion connected with the College, whether literary or festive", a vision was formed of a single building containing a large theater as well as a large open hall, and thus meeting both goals.

A site was found on the "Delta", the triangle bounded by Cambridge, Kirkland, and Quincy Streets. (Note: "During the nineteenth century, Kirkland street went by the name of 'Professors' Row' ... On the south side of the street was the college playground, the 'Delta,' so called from its shape being that of the Greek letter, bounded by Kirkland, Cambridge and Quincy streets. Here the football games took place." To take over the Delta's prior role, Jarvis Field was purchased‍—‌about five acres, or 2 ha, bounded by Massachusetts Avenue, Oxford Street, Everett Street, and now-defunct Jarvis Street; it is now the site of Harvard Law School. In 1874, Harvard played McGill there in the first rugby-style football game played in the United States. In the 1960s Kirkland Street was truncated in conjunction with construction of the Science Center, so that the Delta no longer exists as an isolated city block.) The project was formally named Memorial Hall in September 1870, and on October 6 the cornerstone was laid, Oliver Wendell Holmes Sr. composing a hymn for the occasion. (Note: Holmes' hymn: Not with the anguish of hearts that are breaking / Come we as mourners to weep for our dead; Grief in our breasts has grown weary with aching, / Green is the turf where our tears we have shed. While o'er their marbles the mosses are creeping / Stealing each name and its record away. Give their proud story to memory's keeping, / Shrined in the temple we hallow today. Hushed are their battlefields, ended their marches. / Deaf are their ears to the drumbeat of morn-- Rise from the sod ye far columns and arches! / Tell their bright deeds to the ages unborn. Emblem and legend may fade from the portal, / Keystone may crumble and portal may fall; They were the builders whose work is immortal, / Crowned with the dome that is over us all.)

In May 1878, the Committee of Fifty notified the President and Fellows that the project was complete and the premises ready for formal transfer to the university. On July 8 the President and Fellows unanimously voted to "accept with profound gratitude this splendid and precious gift".

== Architecture and facilities ==
The building's High Victorian Gothic design, by Harvard alumni William Robert Ware and Henry Van Brunt, was selected in a blind competition. A 1907 publication gives dimensions of 305 by 113 feet, with a height of 190 feet at the tower; a 2012 source gave a height of 195 feet, making it the ninth-tallest building in Cambridge at that time. Its 1970 National Historic Landmark designation recognized it one of the nation's most dramatic examples of High Victorian Gothic architecture.

A general restoration was carried out between 1987 and 1996.

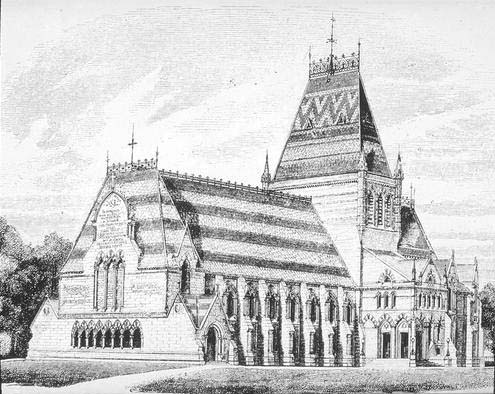
An unadopted early design, viewed from the southwest

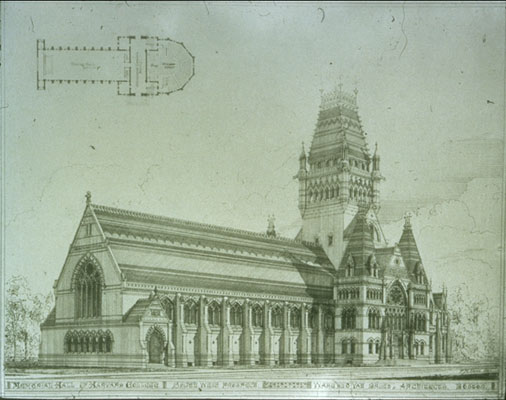
Memorial Hall as originally built. Inset plan shows Alumni Hall (left and center), Memorial Transept (center-right), and Sanders Theatre (right).

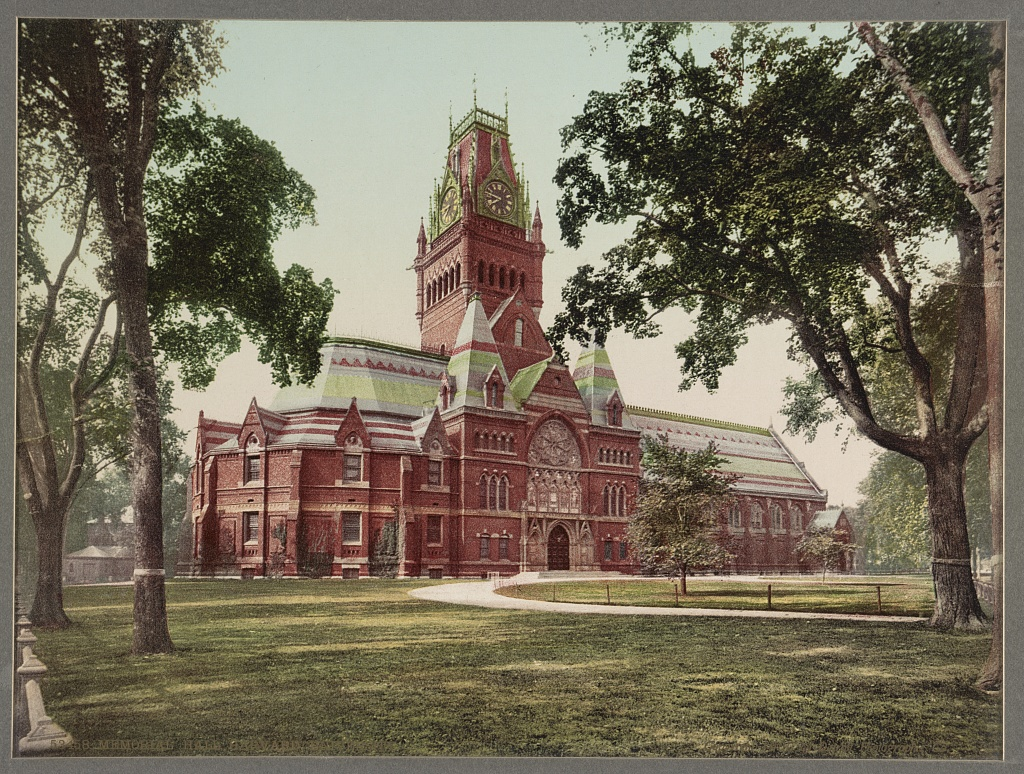
View from northeast, showing four-faced clock added in 1897 and destroyed by fire 1956.

=== Annenberg Hall ===
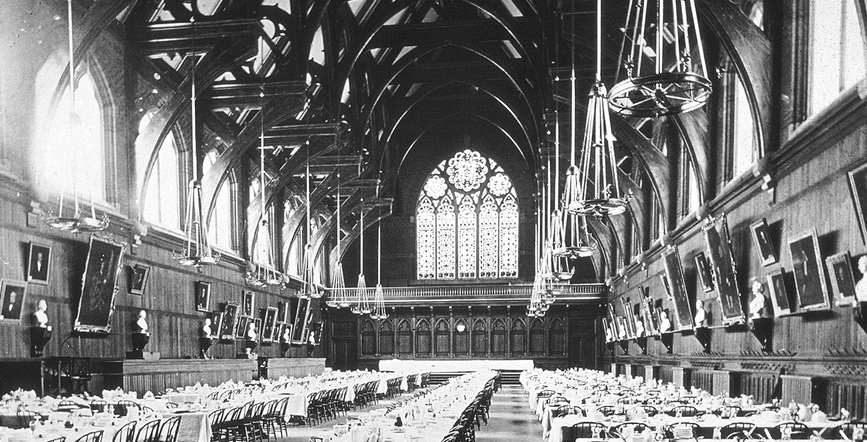
Alumni (now Annenberg) Hall in 1878‍—‌"in which students and graduates might be inspired by the pictured and sculpted presence of [Harvard's] founders, benefactors, faculty, presidents, and most distinguished sons". A 1916 guide described it as "very impressive; in spite of the mistake of ill-placed rows of hat-racks ..."

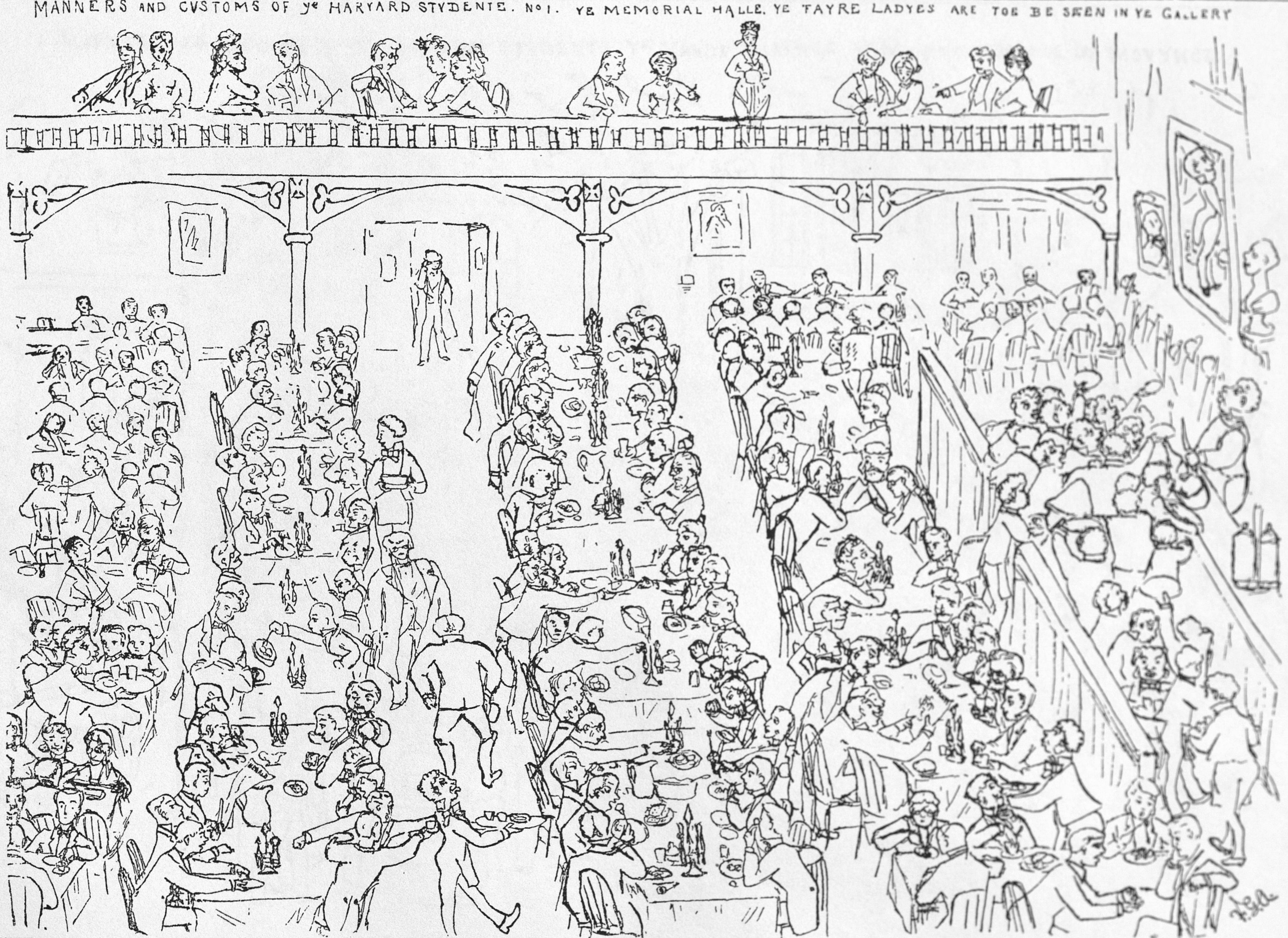
Drawing by F.~G. Attwood for the Harvard Lampoon (1877), "Manners And Customs Of Ye Harvard Studente". Donald Harnish Fleming wrote, "If you are stuck with a friend or relative who wants to see the sights of Cambridge ... treat him to a view of the animals feeding in Mem. Hall", but another observer claimed, "In the great Memorial Hall ... the best of deportment is always to be seen".

What was originally known as Alumni Hall—nine thousand square feet shaped by massive wooden trusses, walnut paneling, and a blue, stenciled ceiling—was dedicated in 1874.

Originally intended for formal occasions such as alumni dinners, it was almost immediately converted to a dining commons, and was for fifty years the college's main dining hall (charging, in 1884, $3.97 for a month's meals). In 1893, Harvard Graduates Magazine described "the throngs of men who, at one o'clock, are to be seen racing across the yard from Harvard, Boylston, and Sever [Halls], striving to reach [Memorial] Hall ahead of slower competitors for vacant seats at the overtaxed tables". But "as the center of University life moved south toward the Charles, [the dining commons] became less popular and closed in 1925" (see Harvard College § House system), after which Alumni Hall saw mostly light use, typically as a venue for dances, banquets, examinations, and the like. In 1934, The New York Times reported that Harvard officials had "at last found a use for Memorial Hall" by siting a rifle range in the basement.

During World War II, the Crimson reported that "the Great Hall" was being used "in winter-time for the 6 o'clock in the morning calisthenics of the [military] Chaplain's School" (though without explaining why Harvard Divinity students had been singled out for this treatment) and intimated that Stevens Laboratory, in the basement, "is doing secret work in acoustics".

After extensive renovations, in 1996 the space was renamed Annenberg Hall and supplanted, as the freshman dining hall, the Harvard Union, which had performed that function during most of the intervening time.

=== Sanders Theatre ===
Sanders Theatre, completed in 1875 and first used for Harvard's 1876 commencement, was inspired by Christopher Wren's Sheldonian Theatre. Known for its acoustics, and with 1,000 seats one of Harvard's largest classrooms, Sanders is in demand for lectures, concerts, ceremonies and conferences. Winston Churchill, Theodore Roosevelt, Martin Luther King Jr., and Mikhail Gorbachev have all spoken there.

Sanders features John La Farge's stained-glass window Athena Tying a Mourning Fillet; statues of James Otis (by Thomas Crawford) and Josiah Quincy III (by William Wetmore Story) flank the stage. The exterior gables display busts of great orators: Demosthenes, Cicero, John Chrysostom, Jacques-Bénigne Bossuet, William Pitt, 1st Earl of Chatham, Edmund Burke, and Daniel Webster.

Sanders Theatre contributed in an unusual way to the early work of Wallace Sabine, considered the founder of architectural acoustics. In 1895, tasked with improving the dismal acoustical performance of the Fogg Museum's lecture hall, Sabine carried out a series of nocturnal experiments there, using hundreds of seat cushions borrowed from nearby Sanders as sound-absorbent material; his work each night was limited by the requirement that the cushions be returned to Sanders in time for morning lectures there. The scientific unit of sound absorption, the sabin, is very close to the absorption provided by one Sanders Theatre cushion.

=== Memorial Transept ===
The Memorial Transept [2,600 square feet (240 m^{2})] serves as a vestibule for Sanders Theatre. It consists of a 60-foot-high (18 m) gothic vault above a marble floor, with black walnut paneling and stenciled walls, a large stained glass window over each of two exterior doors, and twenty-eight white tablets listing the 136 Harvard men who died fighting for the Union:

Down the lofty and impressive main corridor there are tablets to one after another of the many who thus died‍—‌a thrilling list. One sees such old New England names as Peabody, Wadsworth, and Bowditch; one sees the name of Fletcher Webster; one sees that an Edward Revere died at Antietam and a Paul Revere at Gettysburg.

Confederate deaths are not represented.

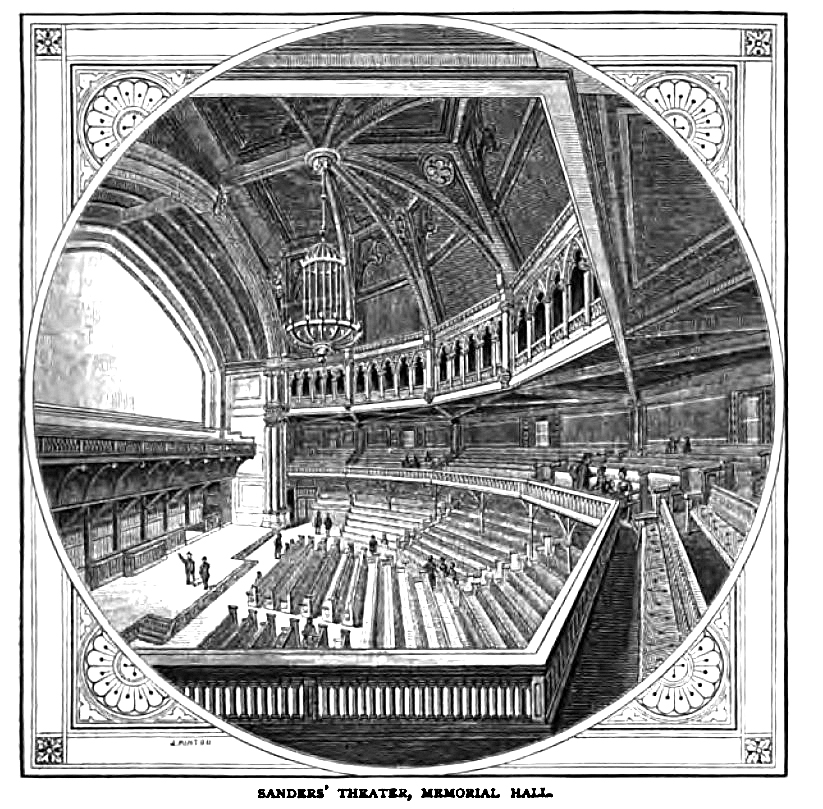
Sanders Theatre, c. 1876

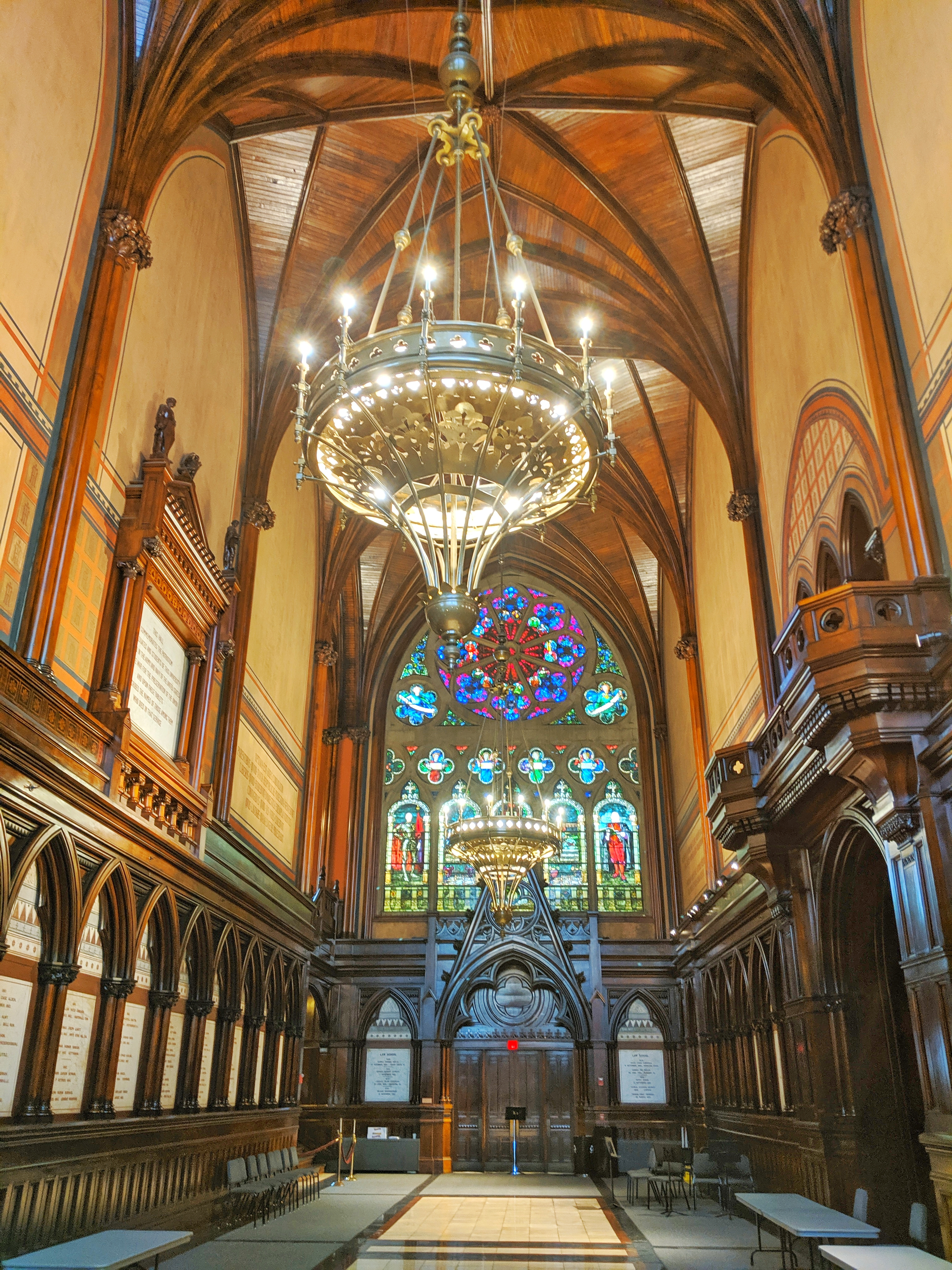
Memorial Transept seen from the north door

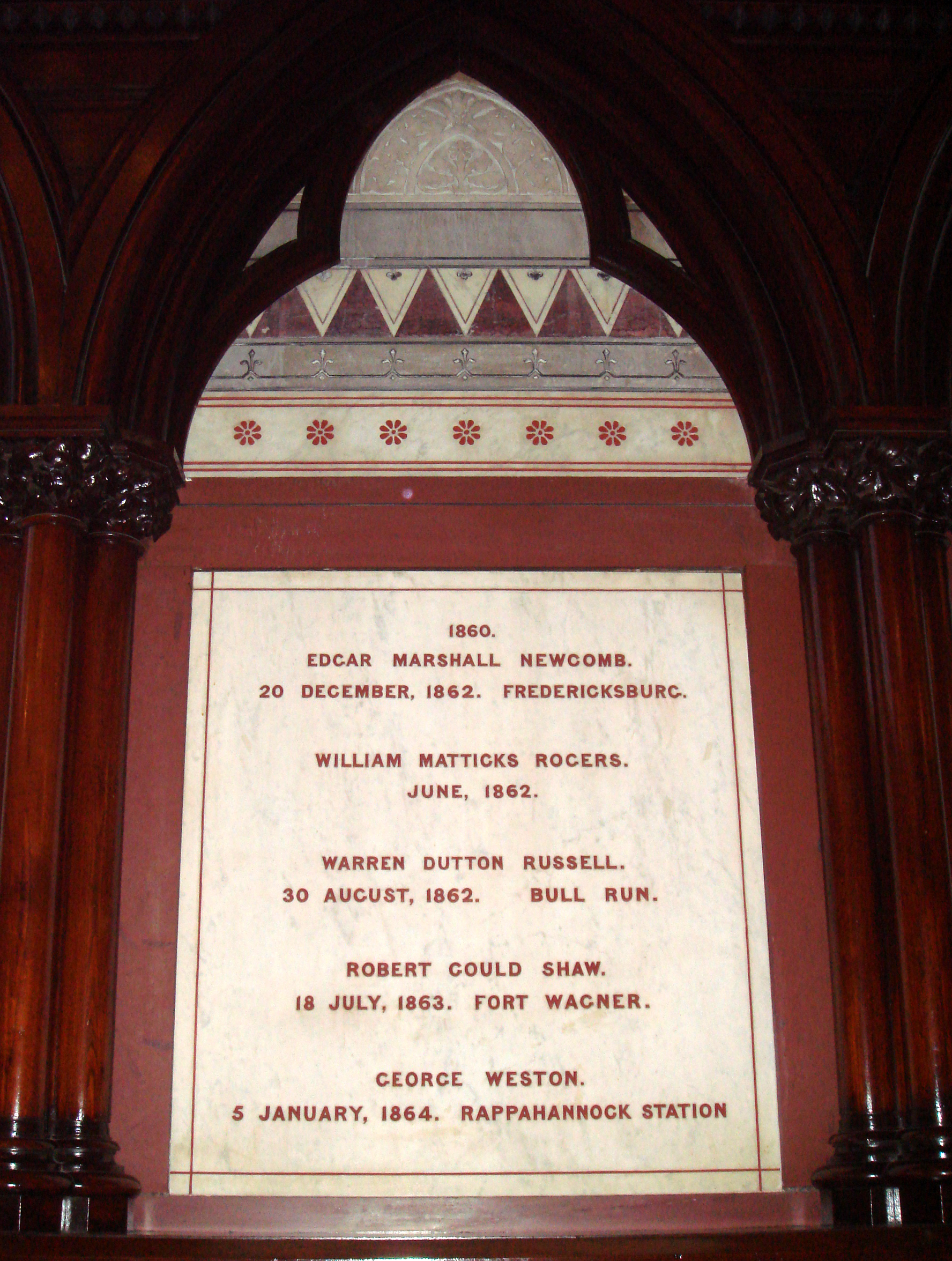
Twenty-eight marble tablets honor Harvard's Union dead. This one lists Robert Gould Shaw, Class of 1860.

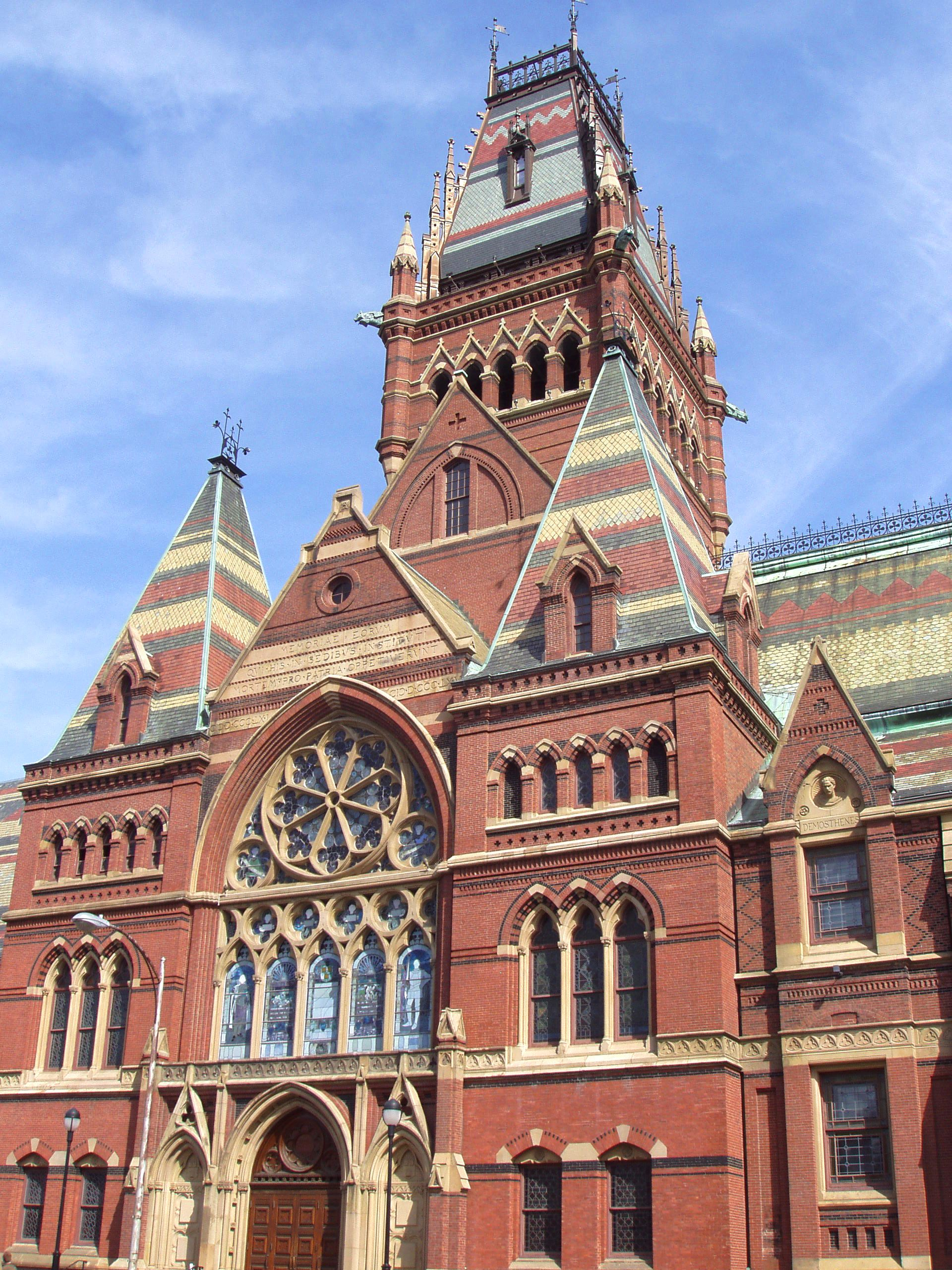
The tower following its 1996 restoration to its 1877–1897 appearance

=== Loker Commons ===
Beneath Annenberg Hall, Loker Commons offers a student pub, music practice spaces, and other facilities.

=== Fenestration ===
Twenty-two stained-glass windows, installed between 1879 and 1902, include several by John La Farge, Louis Comfort Tiffany Studios, Donald MacDonald, Sarah Wyman Whitman, and Charles Mills.

=== Tower and clock ===
The central tower was nearly complete by 1876, but criticism convinced Van Brunt and Ware to revise it in 1877. In 1897, added was what a 1905 guidebook described as "an enormous [four-faced clock which] detonates the hours in a manner which is by no means conducive to the sleep of the just and the rest of the weary", and which Kenneth John Conant termed "railroad Gothic".

In 1932, the clock's driving works, and the associated 155-pound (70 kg) bell-clapper, were somehow lowered 115 feet (35 m) to the ground without attracting attention; visiting Yale students were suspected but the clapper was never found. Three years later the disappearance of the replacement clapper, under similar circumstances, was rumored to be Yale University's revenge for the theft of its mascot, Handsome Dan.

The upper half of the tower was destroyed by fire in 1956 and rebuilt, to its 1877–1897 appearance, in 1996.

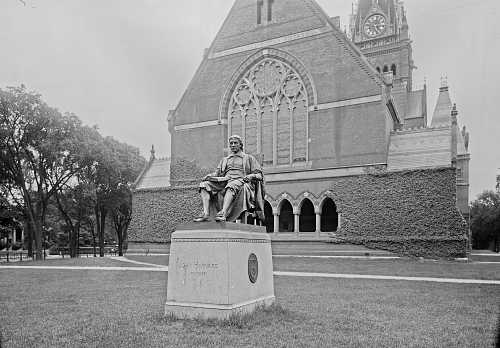
The John Harvard statue stood before Memorial Hall's west façade from 1884 to 1924, when it was moved to Harvard Yard.

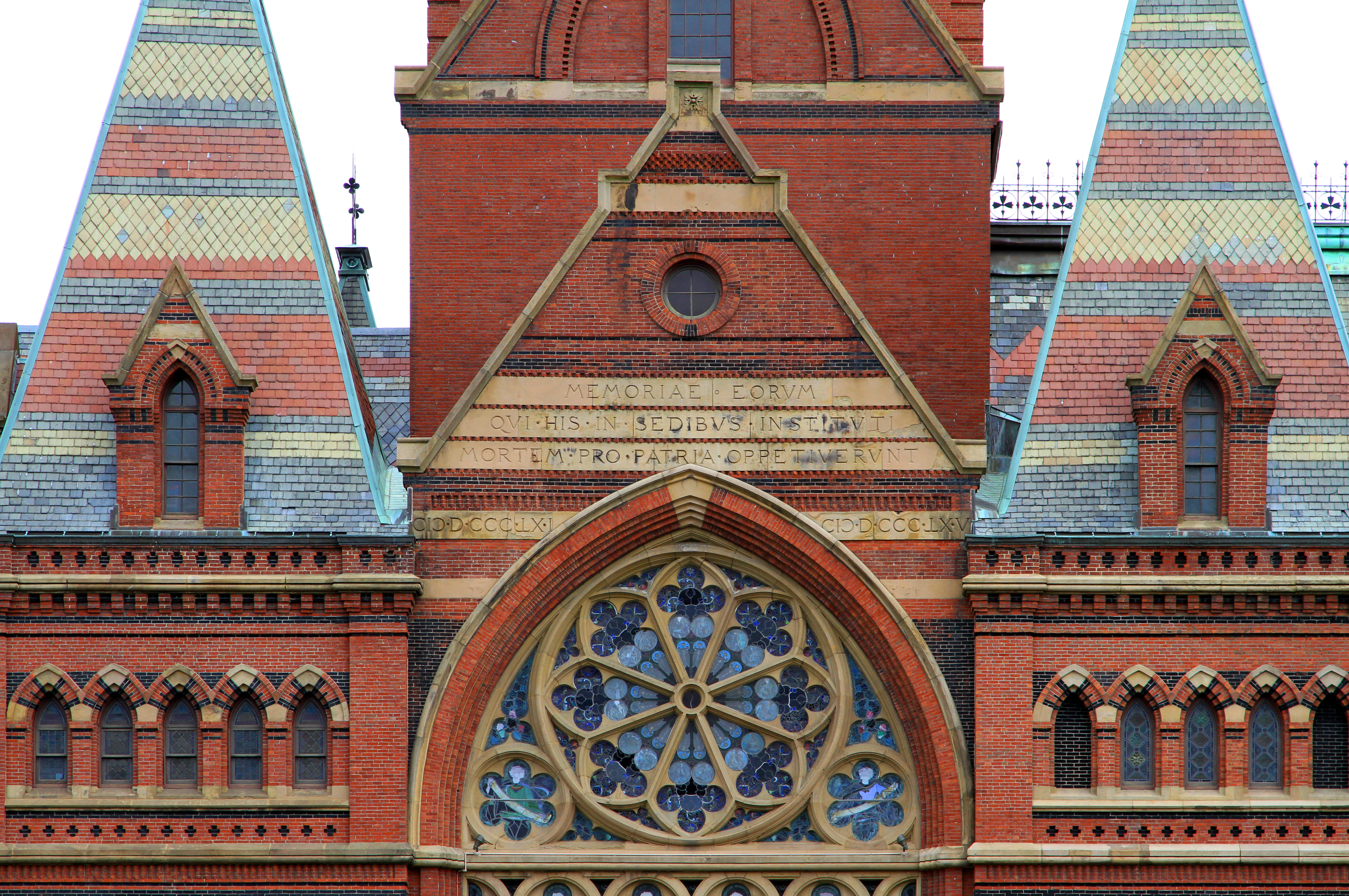
Rose window above south entrance to Memorial Transept

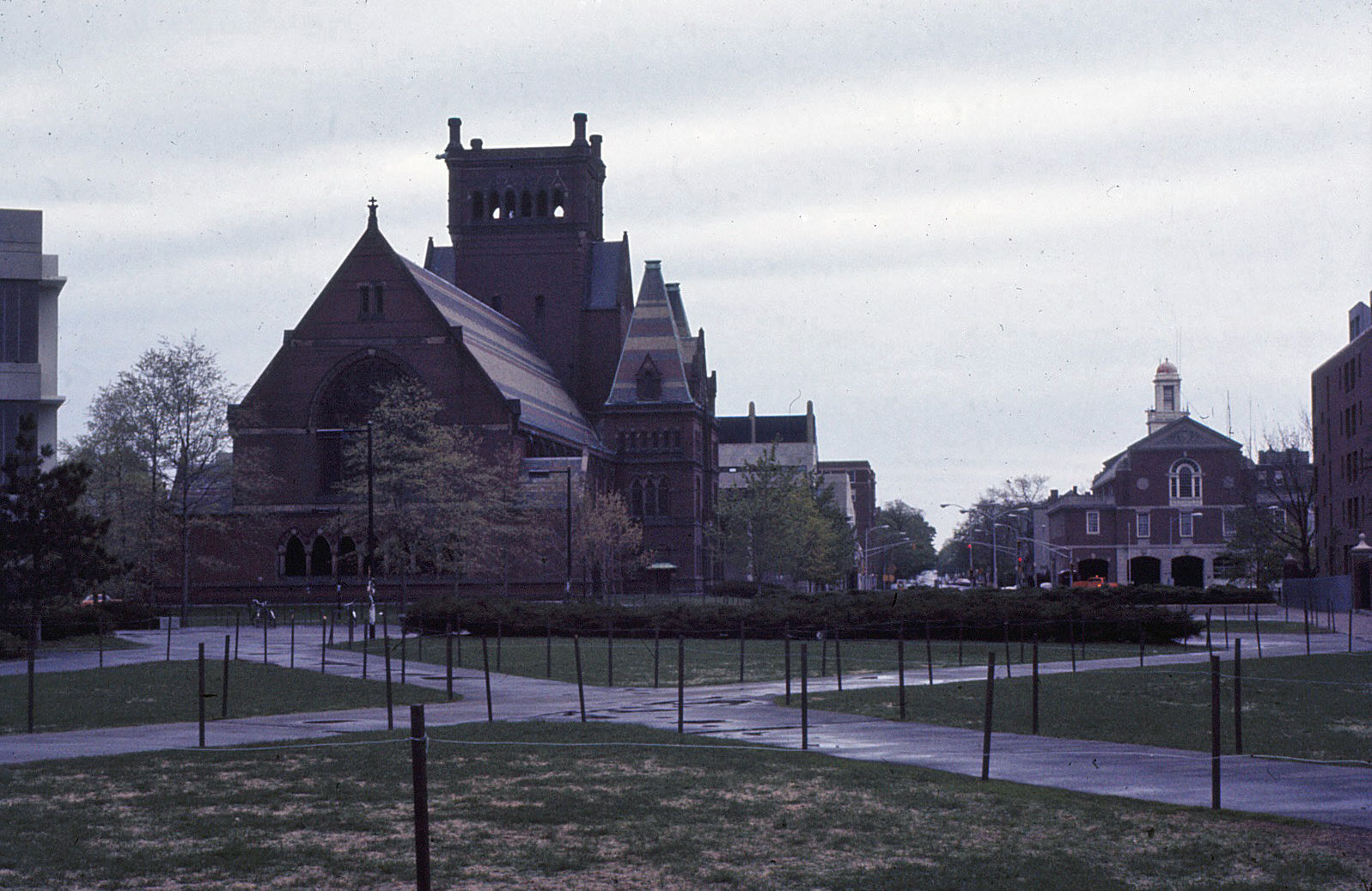
Much of the tower was destroyed in a 1956 fire. The Colonial Revival building at right is a city fire station.

== See also ==
- List of National Historic Landmarks in Massachusetts
- National Register of Historic Places listings in Cambridge, Massachusetts
