= Traité de mécanique céleste =

Treatise by Pierre-Simon Laplace

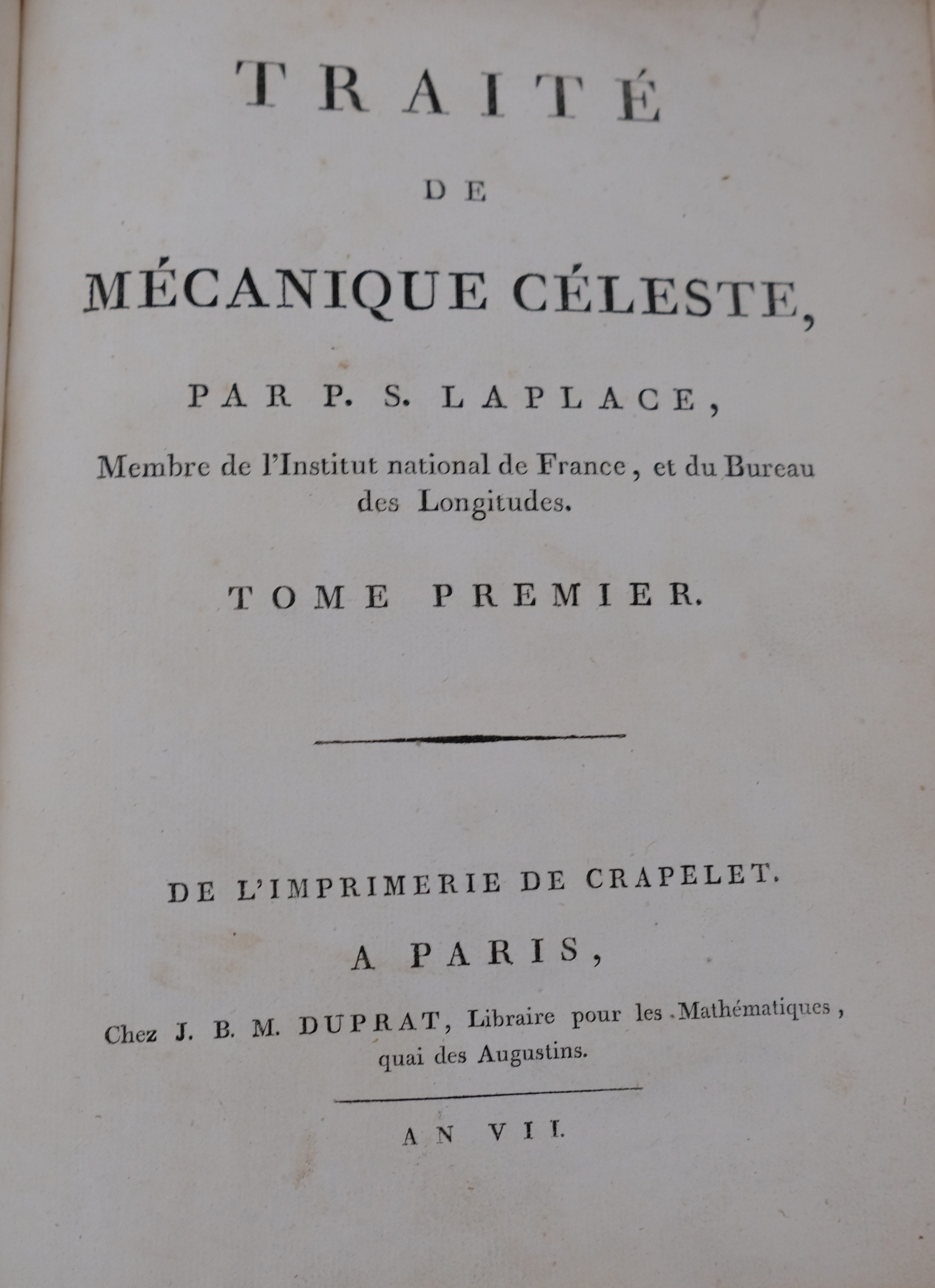
- Author: Pierre-Simon Laplace
- Language: French
- Published: 1798 to 1825

Traité de mécanique céleste (transl. "Treatise of celestial mechanics") is a five-volume treatise on celestial mechanics written by Pierre-Simon Laplace and published from 1798 to 1825 with a second edition in 1829. In 1842, the government of Louis Philippe gave a grant of 40,000 francs for a 7-volume national edition of the Oeuvres de Laplace (1843–1847); the Traité de mécanique céleste with its four supplements occupies the first 5 volumes.

Newton laid the foundations of Celestial Mechanics, at the close of the seventeenth century, by the discovery of the principle of universal gravitation. Even in his own hands, this discovery led to important consequences, but it has required a century and a half, and a regular succession of intellects the most powerful, to fill up the outline sketched by him. Of these, Laplace himself was the last, and, perhaps after Newton, the greatest; and the task commenced in the Principia of the former, is completed in the Mécanique Céleste of the latter. In this last named work, the illustrious author has proposed to himself his object, to unite all the theories scattered throughout the various channels of publication, employed by his predecessors, to reduce them to one common method, and present them all in the same point of view.

If one were asked to name the two most important works in the progress of mathematics and physics, the answer would undoubtedly be, the Principia of Newton and the Mécanique Céleste of Laplace. In their historical and philosophical aspects these works easily outrank all others, and furnish thus the standard by which all others must be measured. The distinguishing feature of the Principia is its clear and exhaustive enunciation of fundamental principles. The Mécanique Céleste, on the other hand, is conspicuous for the development of principles and for the profound generality of its methods. The Principia gives the plans and specifications of the foundations; the Mécanique Céleste affords the key to the vast and complex superstructure.

== Tome I. (1798) ==
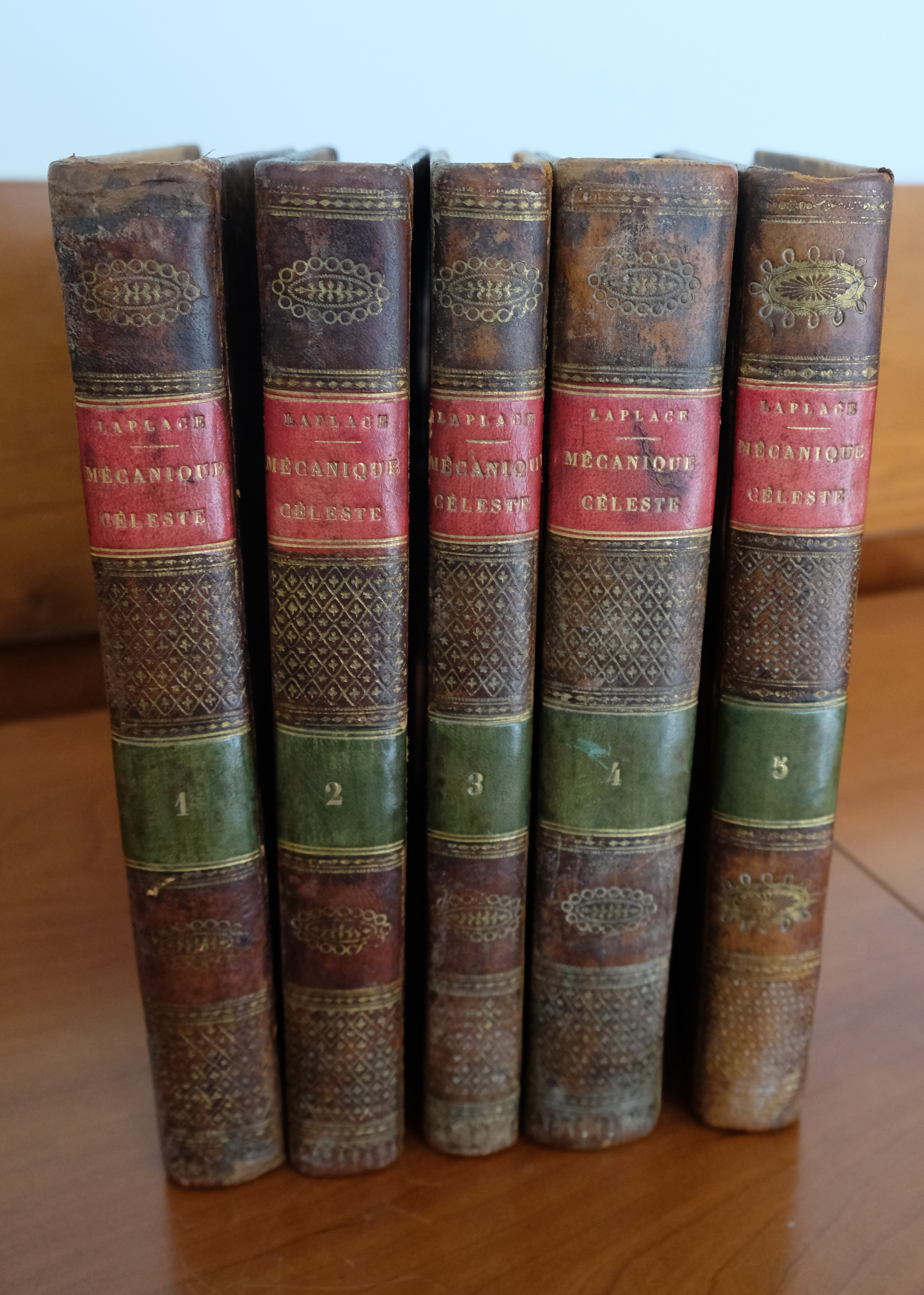
Volumes 1-5 of Pierre-Simon Laplace's "Traité de mécanique céleste" (1799)

=== Livre I. Des lois générales de l'équilibre et du mouvement ===
- Chap. I. De l'équilibre et de la composition des forces qui agissent sur un point matériel
- Chap. II. Du mouvement d'un point matériel
- Chap. III. De l'équilibre d'un système de corps
- Chap. IV. De l'équilibre des fluides
- Chap. V. Principes généraux du mouvement d'un système de corps
- Chap. VI. Des lois du mouvement d'un système de corps, dans toutes les relations mathématiquement possibles entre la force et la vitesse
- Chat. VII. Des mouvemens d'un corps solide de figure quelconque
- Chap. VIII. Du mouvement des fluides

== Tome IV. (1805) ==
=== Livre X. Sur différens points relatifs au système du monde ===
This book contains a discussion of continued fractions and a computation of the complementary error function in terms that came to be called the Laplace continued fraction, 1/(1+q/(1+2q/(1+3q/(...))).

== English translations ==
During the early nineteenth century at least five English translations of Mécanique Céleste were published. In 1814 the Reverend John Toplis prepared a translation of Book 1 entitled The Mechanics of Laplace. Translated with Notes and Additions. In 1821 Thomas Young anonymously published a further translation into English of the first book; beyond just translating from French to English he claimed in the preface to have translated the style of mathematics:

The translator flatters himself, however, that he has not expressed the author's meaning in English words alone, but that he has rendered it perfectly intelligible to any person, who is conversant with the English mathematicians of the old school only, and that his book will serve as a connecting link between the geometrical and algebraical modes of representation.

The Reverend Henry Harte, a fellow at Trinity College, Dublin translated the entire first volume of Mécanique Céleste, with Book 1 published in 1822 and Book 2 published separately in 1827. Similarly to Bowditch (see below), Harte felt that Laplace's exposition was too brief, making his work difficult to understand:

... it may be safely asserted, that the chief obstacle to a more general knowledge of the work, arises from the summary manner in which the Author passes over the intermediate steps in several of his most interesting investigations.

=== Bowditch's translation ===
The famous American mathematician Nathaniel Bowditch translated the first four volumes of the Traité de mécanique céleste but not the fifth volume; however, Bowditch did make use of relevant portions of the fifth volume in his extensive commentaries for the first four volumes.

The first four volumes of Dr. Bowditch's Translation and Commentary were published successively, in 1828, 1832, 1834, and 1839, at the sacrifice of one quarter of his whole property. The expense was largely increased by the voluminous commentary. This was really of the nature of an original work, and was rendered necessary by the frequent gaps which Laplace had left in his own publication. Mr. N. I. Bowditch says, in his biography of his father, that Dr. Bowditch was accustomed to remark, "Whenever I meet in Laplace with the words, Thus it plainly appears, I am sure that hours, and perhaps days, of hard study will alone enable me to discover how it plainly appears."

Bowditch's translation of the first four volumes of Laplace's Traité de mécanique céleste was completed by 1818 but he would not publish it for many years. Almost certainly the cost of publication caused the delay, but Bowditch did not just put the work on one side after 1818 but continued to improve it over the succeeding years. Bowditch was helped by Benjamin Peirce in this project and his commentaries doubled the length of the book. His purpose was more than just an English translation. He wanted to supply steps omitted in the original text; to incorporate later results into the translation; and to give credits omitted by Laplace.

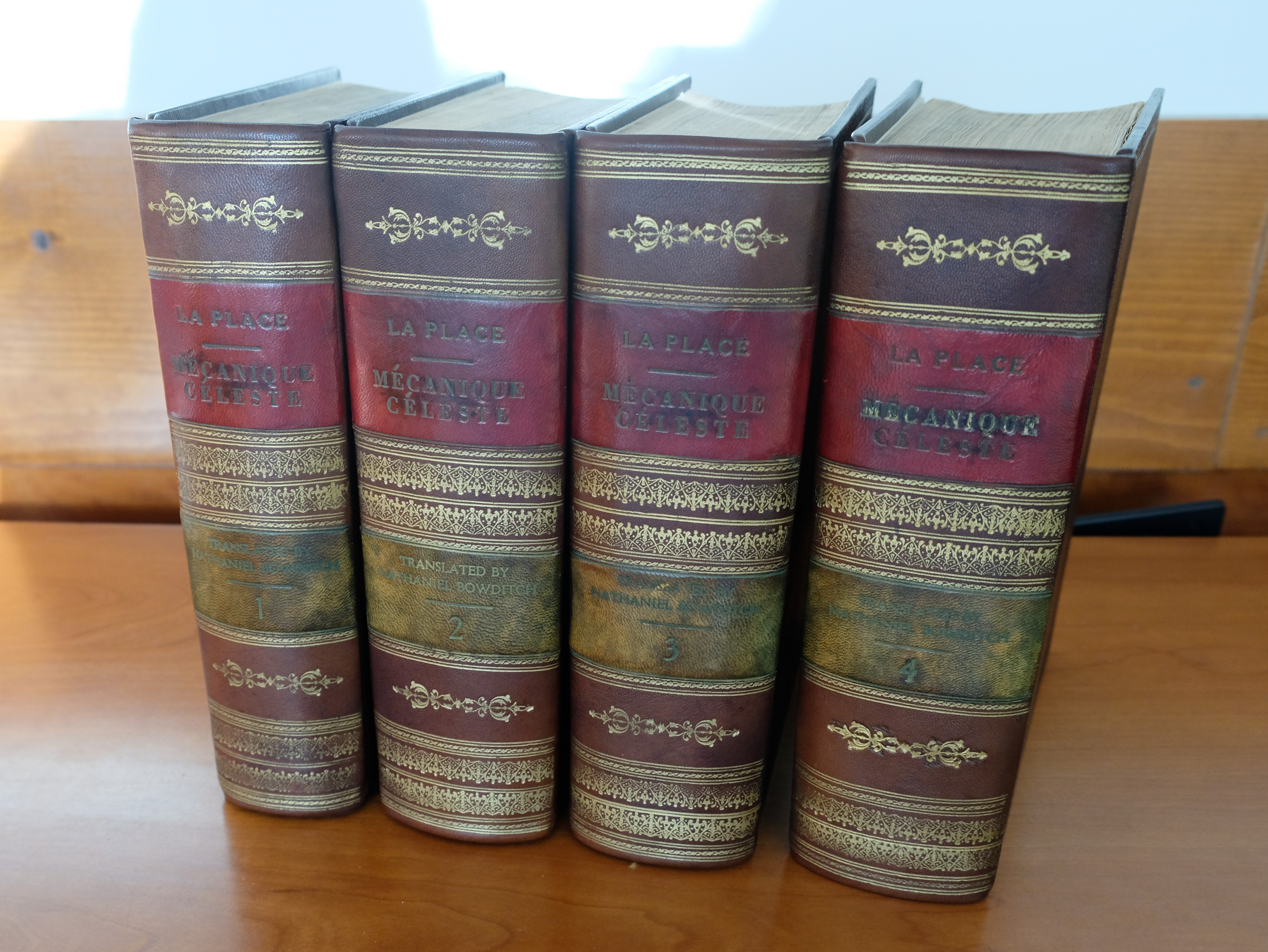
Volumes 1-4 of "Mécanique céleste" translated by Nathaniel Bowditch(1829)

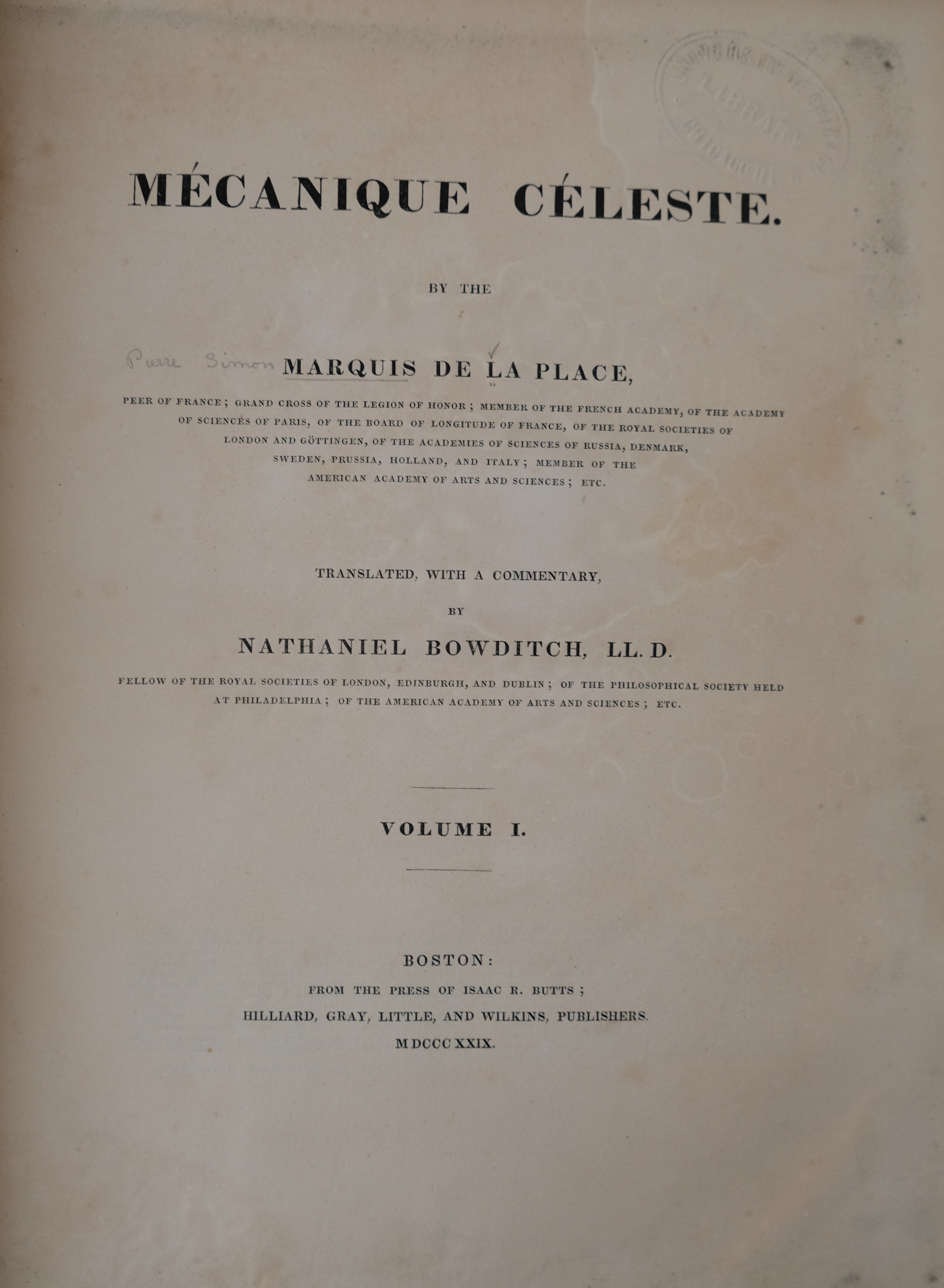
Title page of Volume 1 of "Mécanique céleste" translated by Nathaniel Bowditch(1829)

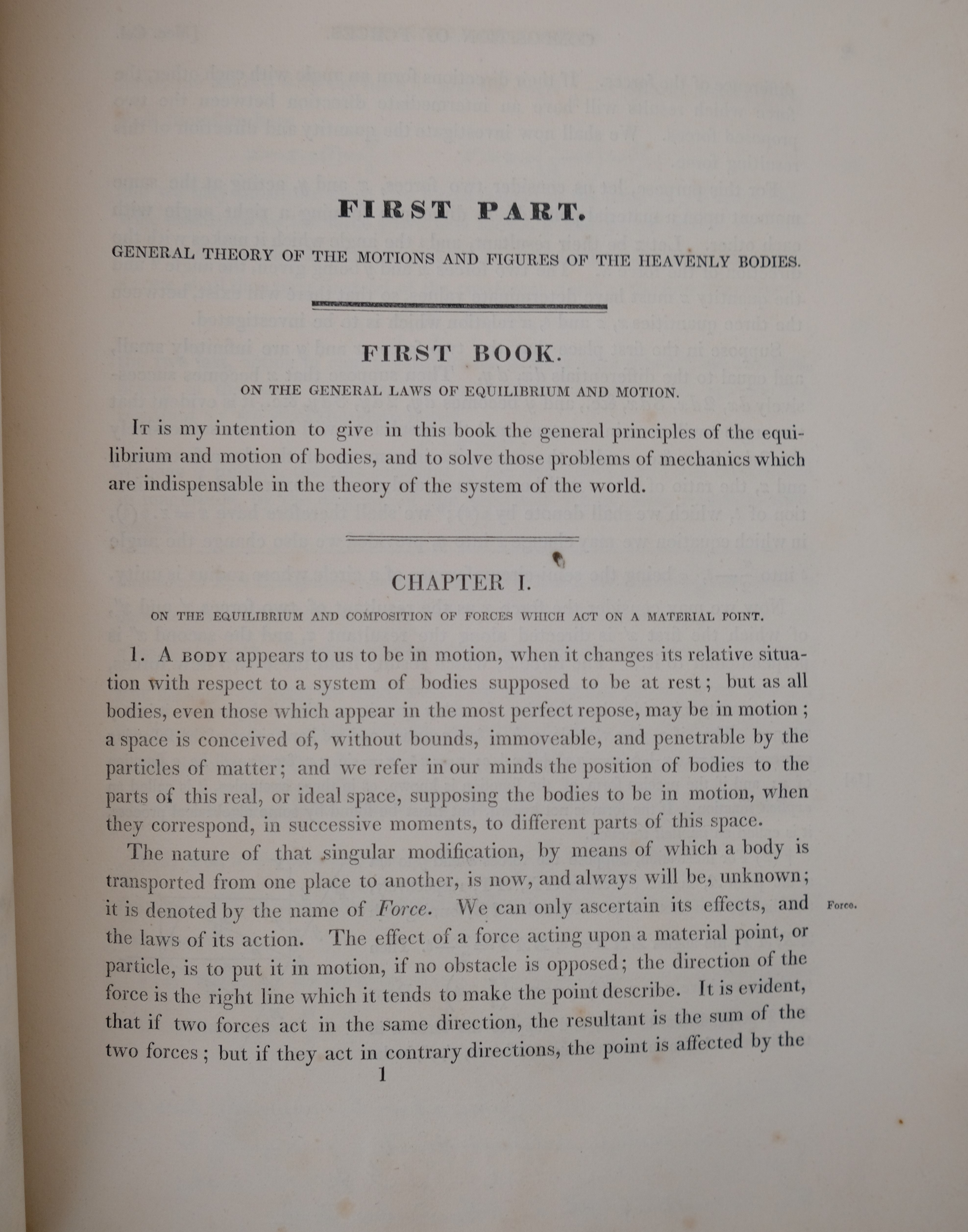
First page of Volume 1 of "Mécanique céleste" translated by Nathaniel Bowditch(1829)

=== Somerville's translation ===
In 1826, it was still felt by Henry Brougham, president of the Society for the Diffusion of Useful Knowledge, that the British reader was lacking a readable translation of Mécanique Céleste. He thus approached Mary Somerville, who began to prepare a translation which would "explain to the unlearned the sort of thing it is—the plan, the vast merit, the wonderful truths unfolded or methodized—and the calculus by which all this is accomplished". In 1830, John Herschel wrote to Somerville and enclosed a copy of Bowditch's 1828 translation of Volume 1 which Herschel had just received. Undeterred, Somerville decided to continue with the preparation of her own work as she felt the two translations differed in their aims; whereas Bowditch's contained an overwhelming number of footnotes to explain each mathematical step, Somerville instead wished to state and demonstrate the results as clearly as possible.

A year later, in 1831, Somerville's translation was published under the title Mechanism of the Heavens. It received great critical acclaim, with complimentary reviews appearing in the Quarterly Review, the Edinburgh Review, and the Monthly Notices of the Royal Astronomical Society.
