= Nathaniel Bowditch House =

Historic house in Massachusetts, United States

- U.S. National Register of Historic Places
- U.S. National Historic Landmark
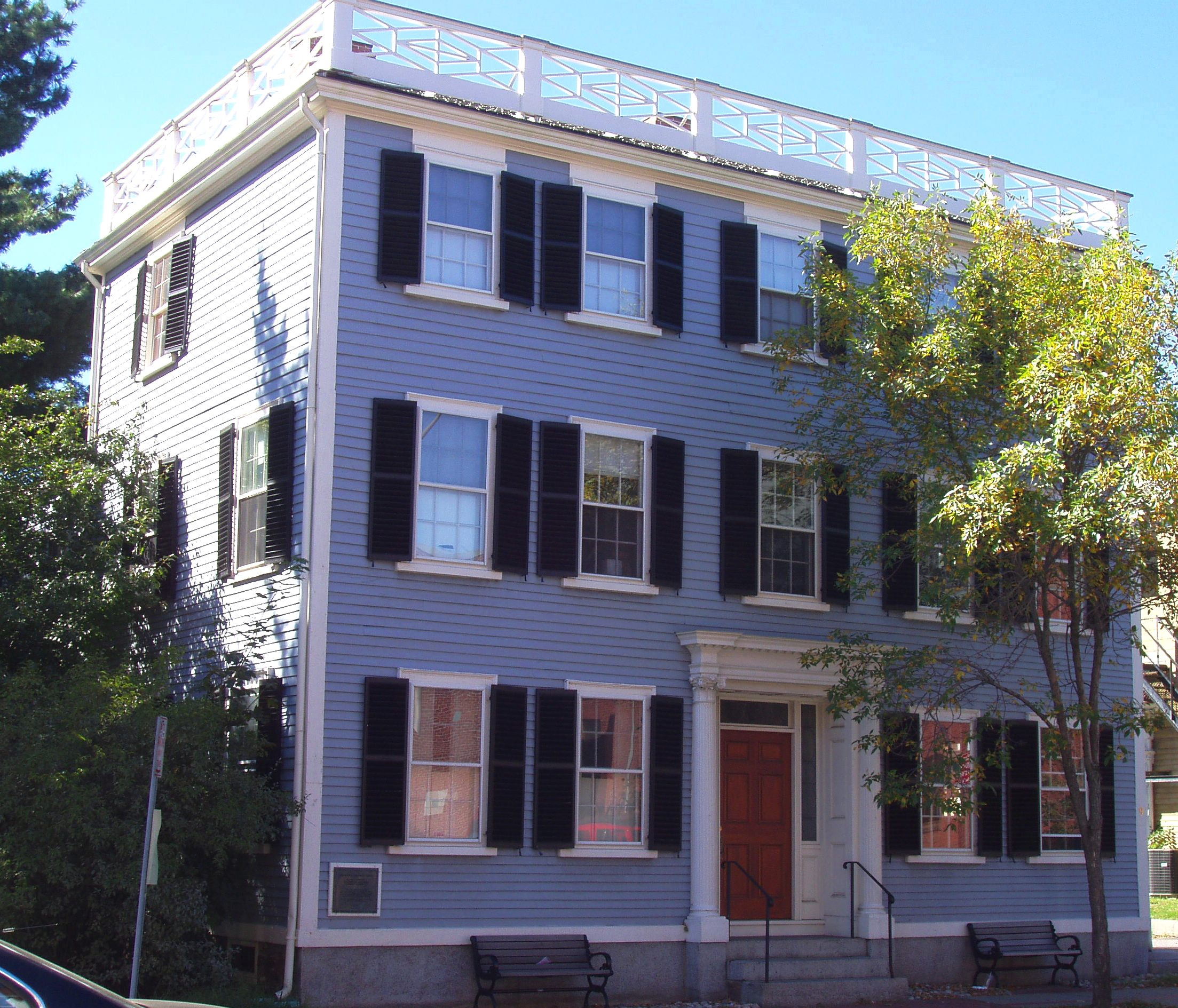

- Location within Massachusetts Location within the United States
- Location: 9 North St. Salem, Massachusetts
- Coordinates: 42°31′18.3″N 70°53′55.9″W
- Built: c. 1759–60
- Architectural style: Federal
- NRHP reference No.: 66000135

Significant dates
- Added to NRHP: October 15, 1966
- Designated NHL: January 12, 1965

The Nathaniel Bowditch House, sometimes called the Bowditch-Osgood House and the Curwen-Ward-Bowditch House, is a historic house and National Historic Landmark at 9 North Street in Salem, Massachusetts. With a construction history apparently dating to 1759–60, the house is distinctive as having been owned by three families important in the maritime history of Salem. Its landmark designation in 1965 stems from its association with Nathaniel Bowditch (1773–1838), the founder of modern navigation, who lived here from 1811 to 1823. The house now serves as the headquarters of Historic Salem, Inc., which was responsible for its rescue from demolition and eventual restoration.

== Description and history ==
The Bowditch House is significant both architecturally and historically. It is a 3 1/2-story clapboarded house in the Federal style, five bays wide and two rooms deep, with a low-pitch hip roof. The building originally stood at 312 Essex Street, and was moved to its present location in the 1940s to avoid demolition as part of a road widening project. Its most elegant feature is its main entrance, which is centered on the front facade. The doorway is recessed from the facade in a paneled opening, and is flanked by sidelight windows and topped by a transom window. The opening is flanked by fluted pilasters with elaborately carved capitals, supporting a flat-roofed architrave. The roof is surrounded by a "chinese balustrade", a restoration of a feature the house was known to have earlier.

Although long believed to have been built c. 1805, researchers in 2000 uncovered evidence within the papers of Samuel Curwen strongly suggestive that the house was actually built in 1759–60. Curwen's diary identifies plans to build a 2 1/2-story structure otherwise dimensionally identical to the Bowditch house, suggesting that the third story may have been the result of alterations in 1805, at which time its Federal styling would also have been added.

The Curwen or Corwin family has a long history in Salem, as shipbuilders, merchants, and businessmen. Samuel Curwen, the builder of this house, was a Loyalist who fled the country at the outset of the American Revolutionary War, and whose estate was plundered during his absence. The childless Curwen left the house to his nephew Samuel Curwen Ward, to whom a young Nathaniel Bowditch was apprenticed as a ship chandler. Ward lost the house to foreclosure in 1800, after which it was bought by a cousin, William Ward. He was a captain of several merchant ships, and was responsible for the alterations that gave the house its present appearance, including the "chinese balustrade" which was representative of his involvement in the China Trade. The woodwork involved in this transformation is now attributed to Salem's master carver, Samuel McIntire.

The Wards sold the house to Nathaniel Bowditch in 1811. Bowditch had by then already published his New American Practical Navigator, a major revision and update of an earlier British work that was riddled with errors. This work provided up-to-date information on tides, currents, and astronomical tables, and has served as the basis for modern navigational guides ever since. This house is one of three in Salem to survive (the other two are the house in which he was born, and a second childhood house). The Bowditches lived here until 1823, when they moved to Boston. The next significant owner of the house was Joseph B. F. Osgood, a prominent Salem lawyer who was city mayor during the American Civil War. His family owned the house from 1858 to 1911. It thereafter was subdivided into apartments, and went through a succession of owners.

Plans by the city to widen North Street threatened the Bowditch House and the adjacent Corwin "Witch House". Concerned preservationists in the community formed Historic Salem, Inc. (HSI), in order to preserve them. The Bowditch House was moved to its present location in 1944, and the Witch House was moved within its lot to accommodate the widened road. It is believed that the original foundation of the Bowditch house may survive under the lawn of the Witch House. HSI restored the Witch House, but not the Bowditch House, which was taken over by the city in the 1960s for town offices. It was returned to HSI in 2000, and given a complete restoration. HSI also leases out several rooms as offices; one current tenant is an office of Orange Mountain Music, the personal record label of minimalist composer Philip Glass.

The Nathaniel Bowditch House was declared a National Historic Landmark in 1965, and was listed on the National Register of Historic Places in 1966.

== See also ==
- List of historic houses in Massachusetts
- National Register of Historic Places listings in Salem, Massachusetts
- List of National Historic Landmarks in Massachusetts

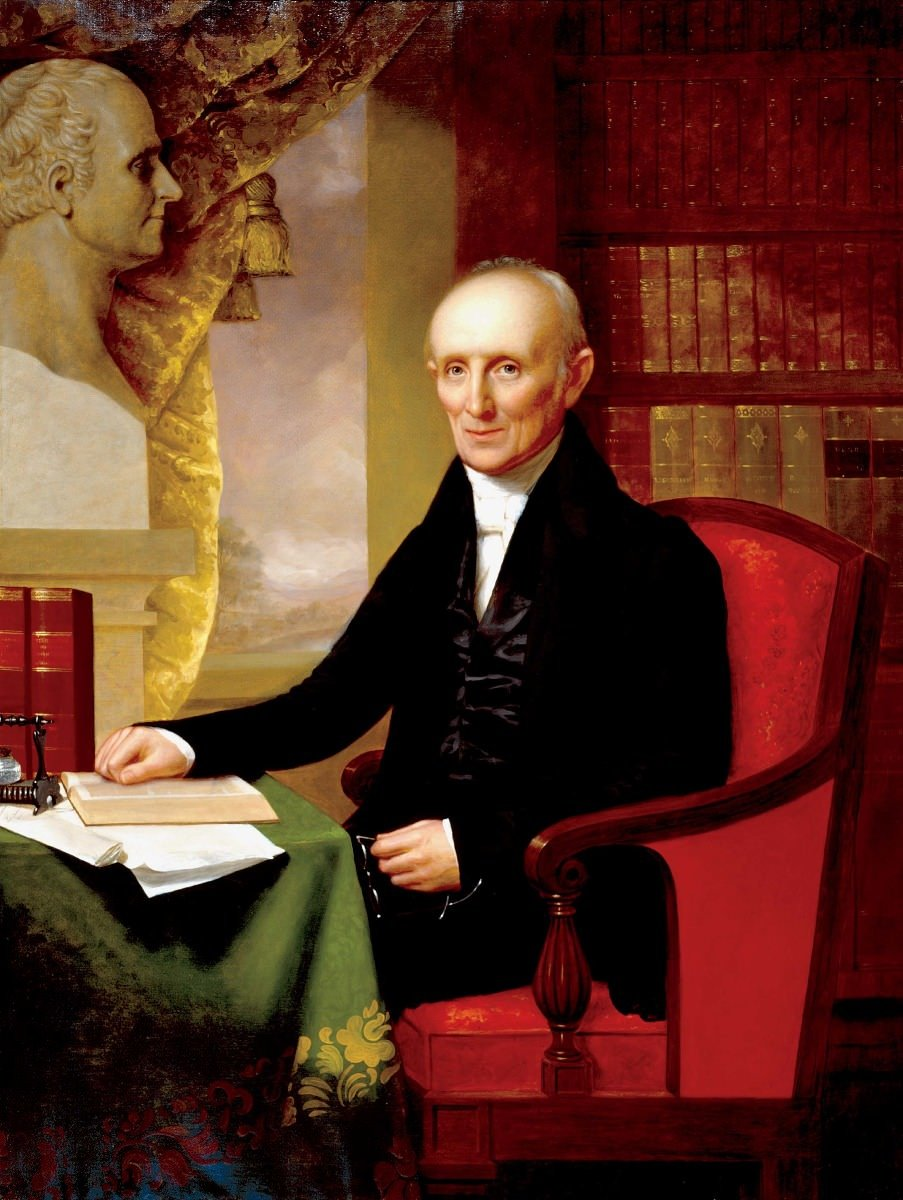
Nathaniel Bowditch

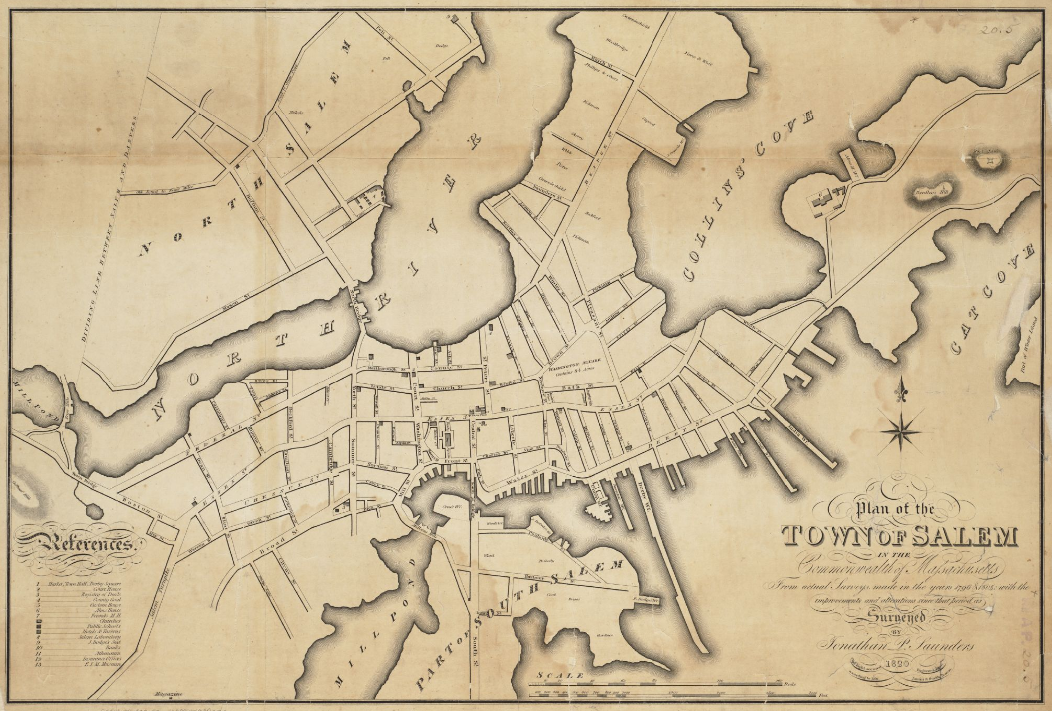
Salem, 1820
