= USNS Bowditch =

USNS Bowditch has been the name of more than one United States Navy ship, and may refer to:

- USNS Bowditch (T-AGS-21), an oceanographic survey ship in non-commissioned Military Sealift Command service from 1958 to c. 1988
- USNS Bowditch (T-AGS-62), an oceanographic survey ship in non-commissioned Military Sealift Command service since 1996

== See also ==
- USS Bowditch
