= Robert Ball Hughes =

British-American sculptor

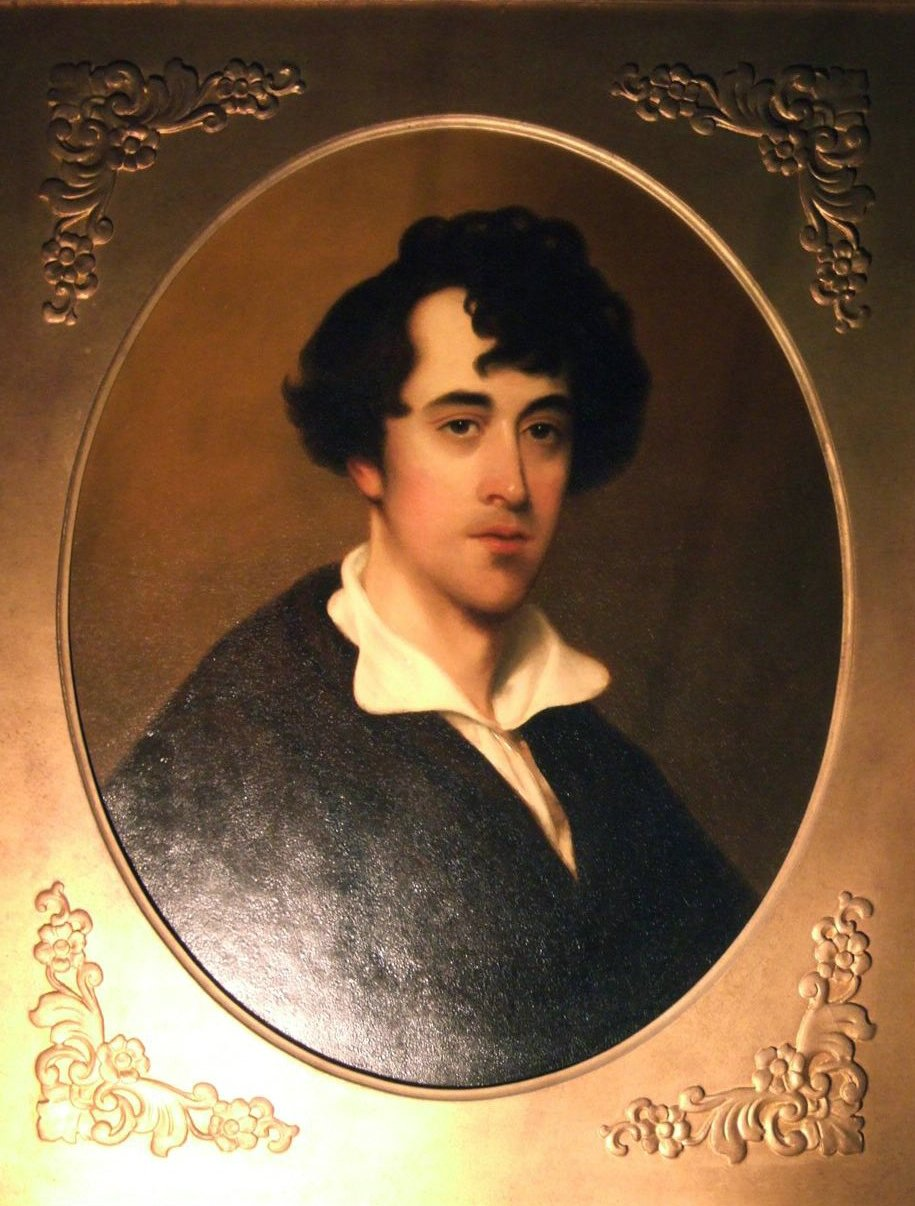
- portrait by John Trumbull
- Born: London
- Died: 5 March 1868; Boston
- Occupation: Sculptor
- Spouse(s): Eliza Ball Hughes

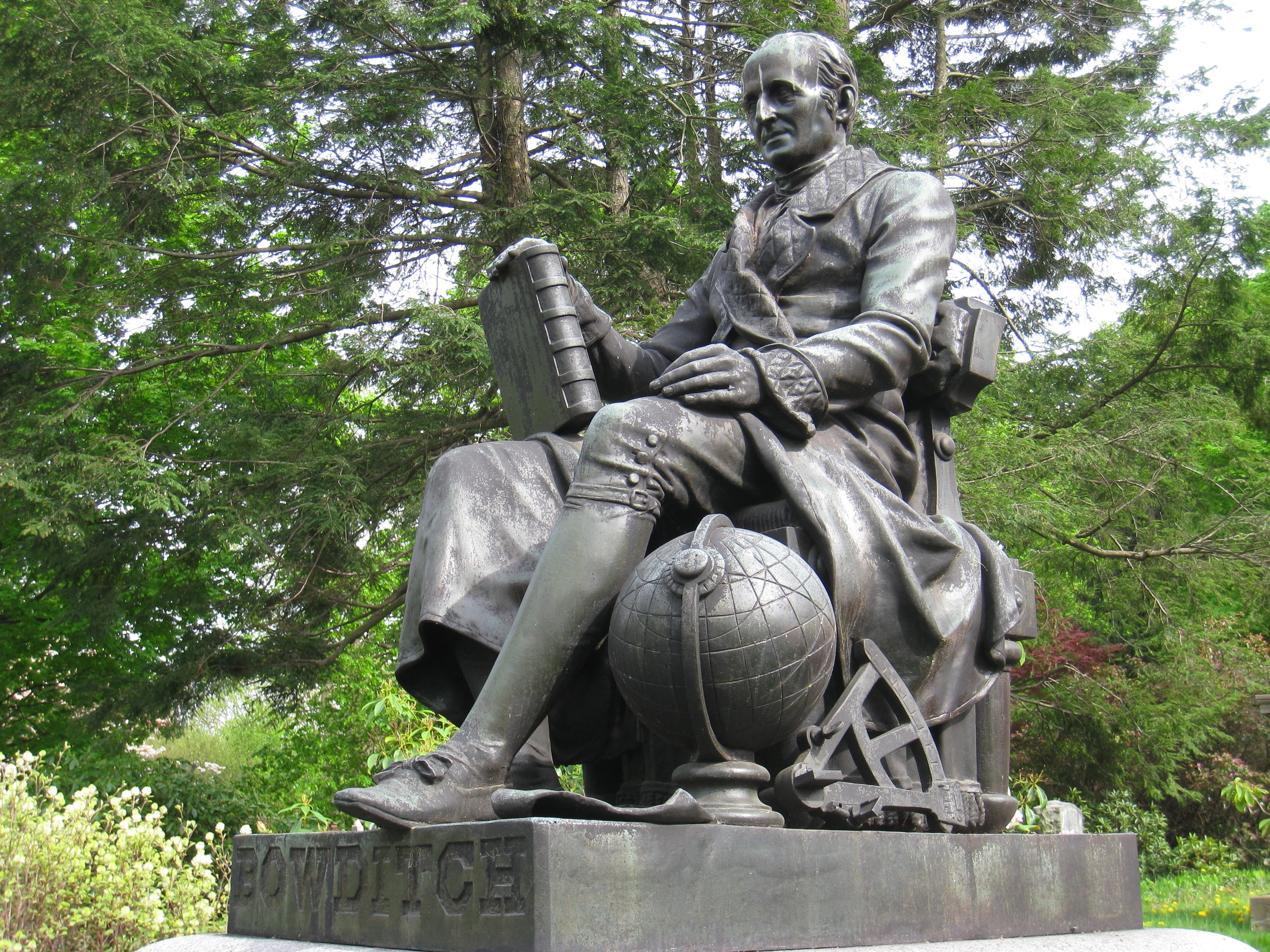
Ball Hughes' statue of Nathaniel Bowditch

Robert Ball Hughes (19 January 1804 – 5 March 1868), often known as Ball Hughes, was a British-American sculptor, born in England and active in the United States.

== Biography ==
Ball Hughes was born in London. His birth year has been confirmed to be 1804 according to his baptismal record on the International Genealogical Index, and not 1806 as has been widely reported. His given name was Robert Balls Hughes according to his baptismal record.

He early exhibited a decided taste for modelling, and at 12 years of age made out of wax candle ends a bas-relief copy of a picture representing the wisdom of Solomon, which was afterward cast in silver. He later studied under Edward Hodges Baily for seven years. During this time, the Royal Academy awarded him a large silver medal for the best copy in bas-relief of the Apollo Belvedere. He also received a silver medal from the Society of Arts and Sciences for a copy of the Barberini Faun, a large silver medal for the best original model from life, and a gold medal for an original composition, "Pandora brought by Mercury to Epimetheus." In 1830 he was elected into the National Academy of Design as an Honorary Academician.

Hughes was commissioned to sculpt busts of various members of Britains nobility and Royal family, including the Duke of Sussex, the Duke of Cumberland and most notably King George IV. Robert Ball Hughes emigrated to New York City in 1829. His first major commission in America, was a high-relief marble memorial to Bishop John H. Hobart for Trinity Church, New York, followed by a statue of New York Governor DeWitt Clinton, and subsequently a statue of Alexander Hamilton (placed atop of the Merchants' Exchange Building New York, but destroyed by fire in 1835). The original plaster study for that work is held by the Museum of the City of New York.

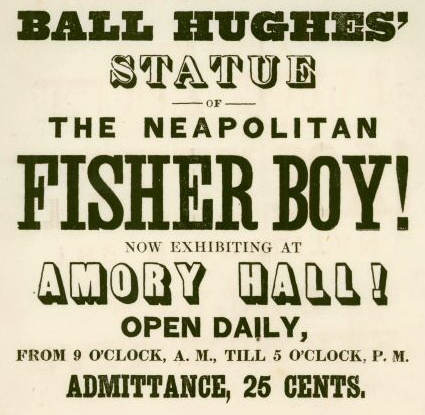
Advertisement for exhibition of Hughes' work at Amory Hall, Boston, ca.1840s

After a short stay in New York, and then Philadelphia, he settled in Boston, where he produced busts of Washington Irving (1836) and Edward Livingston, and a large bronze of mathematician Nathaniel Bowditch for Mount Auburn Cemetery (1847). Ball Hughes' statue of Nathaniel Bowditch was the first large bronze to be cast in America. He made Little Nell and the group Uncle Toby and Widow Wadman, whose plaster models went to the Boston Athenaeum, but were never carved in marble. Among his later works were a model of an equestrian statue of Washington, intended for the city of Philadelphia, a Crucifixion, and a Mary Magdalen.

Ball Hughes also designed numerous wax medallions, as well as coins for the United States mint, including modifications of Christian Gobrecht's design for the Seated Liberty quarter (1838), and the half dime (1859). In his final years, he began to produce burnt wood pictures (pyroengravings or "poker pictures"), including The Witches of MacBeth (c. 1840), Babylonian Lions (1856), Don Quixote in His Study (1863), The Trumpeter (1864), General Grant Proclaiming the Surrender of Richmond (1865), The Last Lucifer Match (1865), and The Monk (1866). He also lectured on art. Hughes is buried in the Cedar Grove Cemetery, Dorchester, Massachusetts.

The National Portrait Gallery contains Ball Hughes' busts of Nathaniel Bowditch, Washington Irving, James Kent, John Marshall, and his medallion of John Trumbull.
