= USCS Bowditch =

History

United States
- Name: Bowditch
- Namesake: Nathaniel Bowditch (1773-1878), a mathematician and author
- Commissioned: 1854
- Decommissioned: 1874

General characteristics
- Type: Schooner
- Length: 70 ft (21 m)
- Beam: 20 ft (6.1 m)
- Draft: 2.9 ft (0.88 m)
- Propulsion: Sails
- Sail plan: Schooner-rigged

USCS Bowditch was a schooner that served as a survey ship in the United States Coast Survey from 1854 to 1874.

Bowditch spent her entire Coast Survey career operating along the United States East Coast.
