= USS Bowditch =

USS Bowditch or USNS Bowditch may refer to:

- USCS Bowditch was a schooner that served as a survey ship in the United States Coast Survey from 1854 to 1874.
- USS Bowditch (AG-30), later AGS-4, a survey ship in commission from 1940 to 1947
- USNS Bowditch (T-AGS-21), an oceanographic survey ship in non-commissioned Military Sealift Command service from 1958 to ca. 1988
- USNS Bowditch (T-AGS-62), an oceanographic survey ship in non-commissioned Military Sealift Command service since 1996
