= Nathaniel Bowditch =

American astronomer and mathematician (1773–1838)

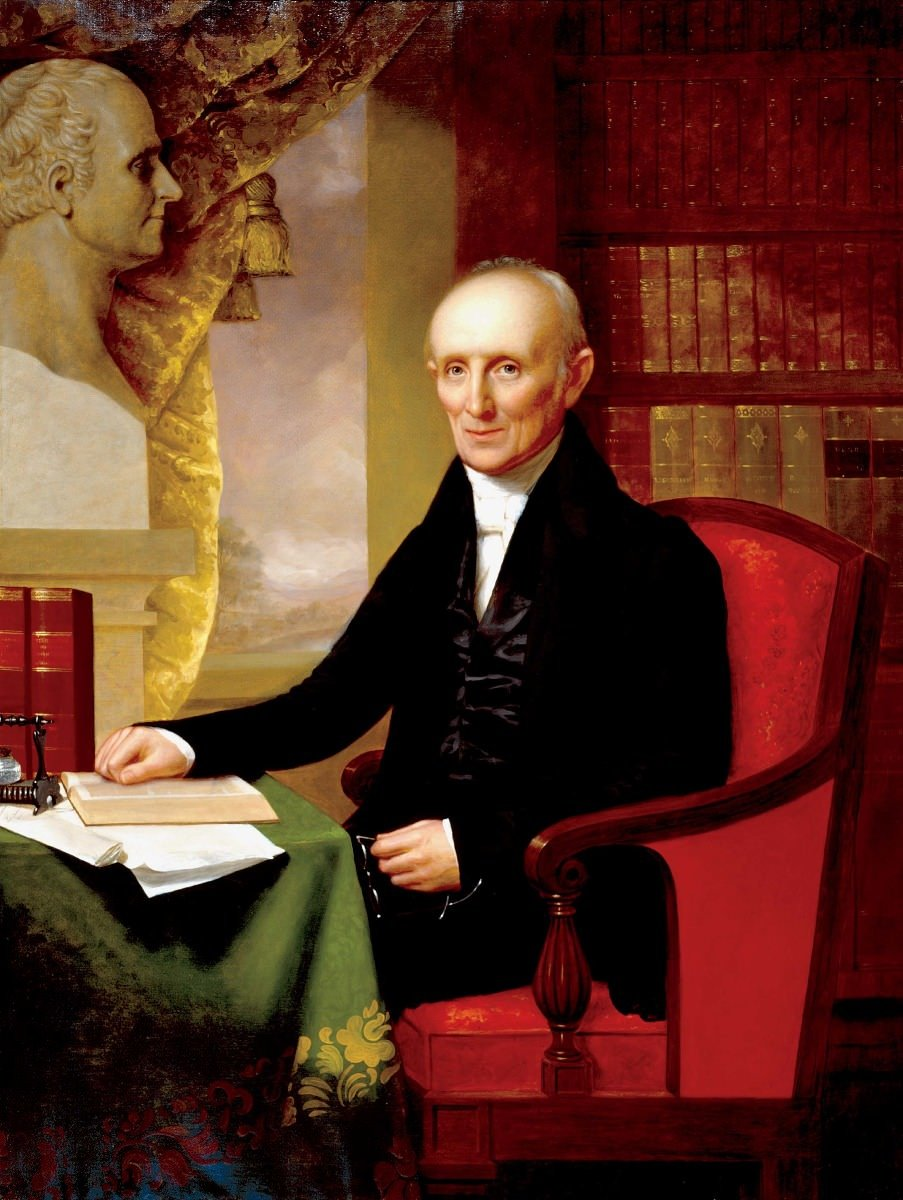
- Bowditch is often credited as the founder of modern maritime navigation.
- Born: March 26, 1773; Salem, Province of Massachusetts Bay
- Died: March 16, 1838 (aged 64); Boston, Massachusetts, US
- Occupations: Mathematician, ship's captain, and actuary
- Spouse(s): Elizabeth Boardman Bowditch, Mary Polly Ingersoll Bowditch

Signature
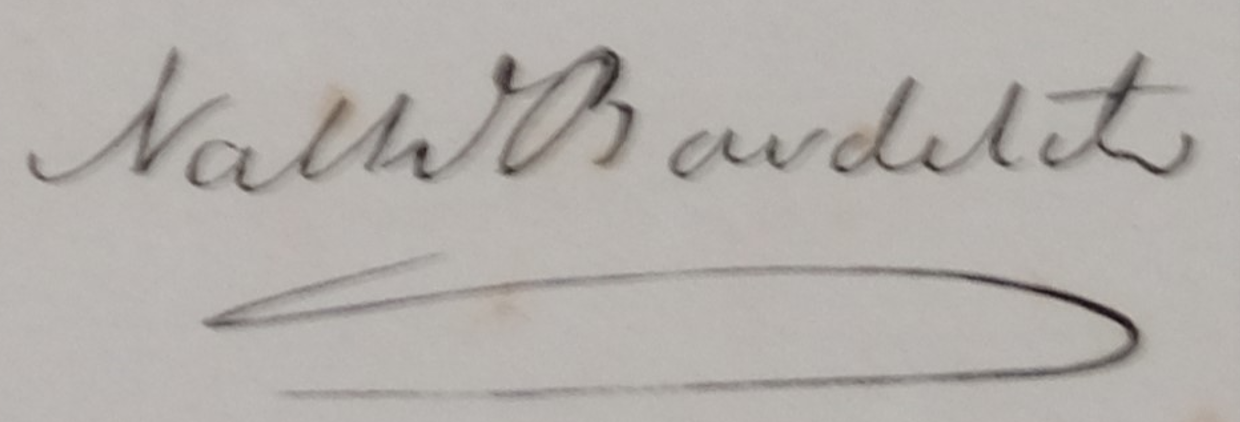

Nathaniel Bowditch (March 26, 1773 – March 16, 1838) was an early American mathematician remembered for his work on ocean navigation. He is often credited as the founder of modern maritime navigation; his book The New American Practical Navigator, first published in 1802, is still carried on board every commissioned U.S. Naval vessel.

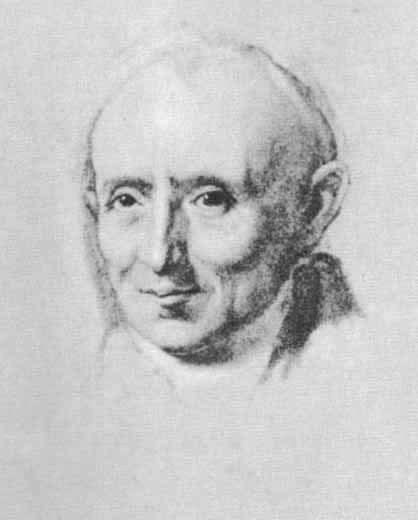
Nathaniel Bowditch (1773–1838), last and unfinished painting by Gilbert Stuart.

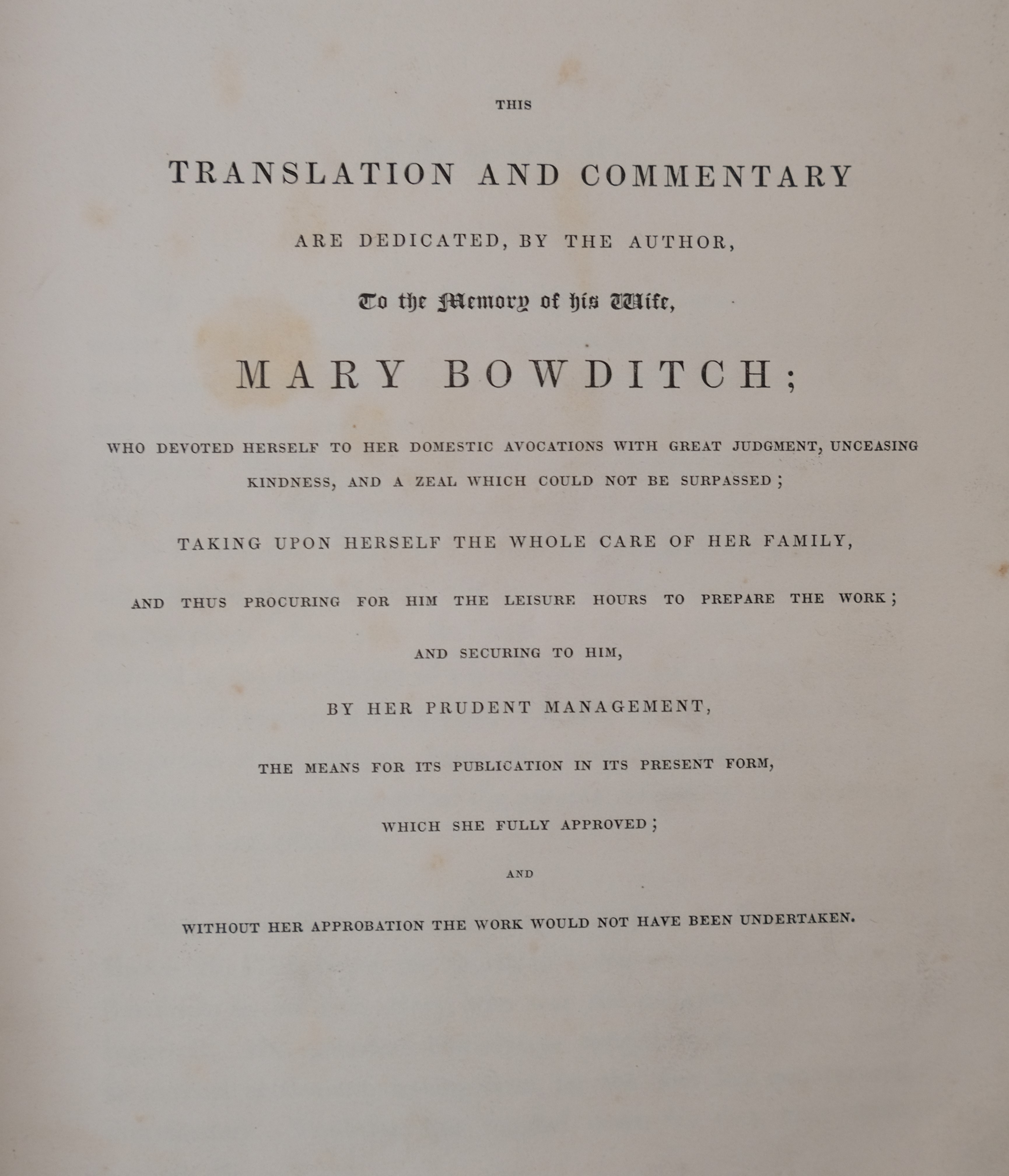
Dedication page by Nathaniel Bowditch in "Mécanique céleste"

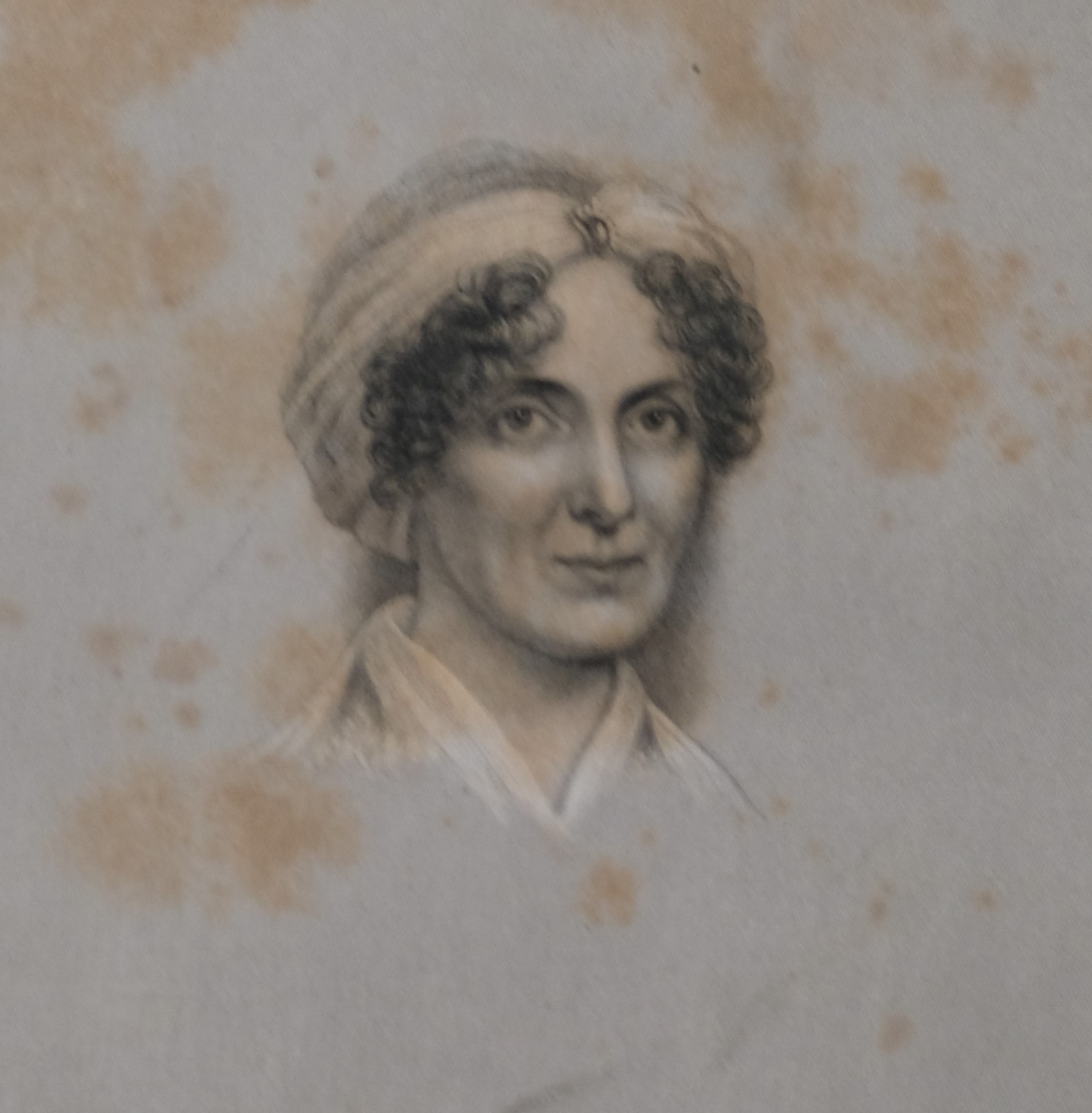
Portrait of Mary Bowditch in Volume 1 of Pierre-Simon Laplace's "Mécanique céleste" (1829), translated by Nathaniel Bowditch

== Life and work ==
Nathaniel Bowditch, the fourth of seven children, was born in Salem, Province of Massachusetts Bay, to Habakkuk Bowditch, a cooper who at one point was a sailor as well but stopped after his ship went aground in 1775, and Mary Ingersoll Bowditch. At the age of ten, he was made to leave school to work in his father's cooperage, before becoming indentured at twelve for nine years as a bookkeeping apprentice to a ship chandler. Here is where he first learned bookkeeping, an important step in his life.

In 1786, age fourteen, Bowditch began to study algebra and two years later he taught himself calculus. He also taught himself Latin in 1790 and French in 1792 so he was able to read mathematical works such as Isaac Newton's Philosophiae Naturalis Principia Mathematica. He found thousands of errors in John Hamilton Moore's The New Practical Navigator; at eighteen, he copied all the mathematical papers of the Philosophical Transactions of the Royal Society of London. Among his many significant scientific contributions would be a translation of Pierre-Simon de Laplace's Mécanique céleste, a lengthy work on mathematics and theoretical astronomy. This translation was critical to the development of astronomy in the United States.

Serendipity aided Bowditch's self-directed study, in as much as he found himself able to use the eminent Irish chemist Richard Kirwan's library: Hugh Hill, a privateer from Salem who captained the Pilgrim, had intercepted the ship carrying the library between Ireland and England and brought the library back to Salem in 1781.

In 1795, Bowditch went to sea on the first of four voyages as a ship's clerk and captain's writer. His fifth voyage was as master and part owner of a ship. Following this voyage, he returned to Salem in 1803 to resume his mathematical studies and enter the insurance business. One of his family homes in Salem, the Nathaniel Bowditch House, still exists and was restored in 2000. This house has been designated a National Historic Landmark.

In 1798 Bowditch married Elizabeth Boardman, who died seven months later. In 1800 Bowditch married his second wife and cousin, Mary "Polly" Ingersoll Bowditch (1781–1834). They had 2 daughters and 6 sons, including Henry Ingersoll Bowditch and William Ingersoll Bowditch. Among his grandchildren were Henry Pickering Bowditch and Charles Pickering Bowditch.

In 1802, his book The American Practical Navigator was first published. That same year, Harvard University awarded Bowditch an honorary degree.

In 1804, Bowditch became America's first insurance actuary as president of the Essex Fire and Marine Insurance Company in Salem. Under his direction, the company prospered despite difficult political conditions and the War of 1812.

Bowditch's mathematical and astronomical work during this time earned him a significant standing, including election to the American Academy of Arts and Sciences in 1799 and the American Philosophical Society in 1809. He was offered the chair of mathematics and physics at Harvard in 1806, but turned it down. In 1804, an article on his observations of the Moon was published and in 1806 he published naval charts of several harbors, including Salem. More scientific publications followed, including a study of a meteor explosion (1807), three papers on the orbits of comets (1815, 1818, 1820) and a study of the Lissajous figures created by the motion of a pendulum suspended from two points (1815).

In 1816, Harvard awarded Nathaniel Bowditch an honorary Doctor of Laws.

As well as Harvard, the United States Military Academy and the University of Virginia offered Bowditch chairs in mathematics. Bowditch again refused these offers, perhaps (in the case of the University of Virginia) because the $2,000 salary offered was two-thirds of the salary he received as president of the insurance company.

Bowditch's translation of the first four volumes of Laplace's Traité de mécanique céleste was completed by 1818. Publication of the work, however, was delayed for many years, most likely due to cost. Nonetheless, he continued to work on it with the assistance of Benjamin Peirce, adding commentaries that doubled its length.

By 1819, Bowditch's international reputation had grown to the extent that he was elected as a member of the Royal Societies of Edinburgh and London, and the Royal Irish Academy.

In 1823, Bowditch left the Essex Fire and Marine Insurance Company to become an actuary for the Massachusetts Hospital Life Insurance Company in Boston. There he served as a "money manager" (an investment manager) for wealthy individuals who made their fortunes at sea, directing their wealth toward manufacturing. Towns such as Lowell prospered as a result.

Bowditch's move from Salem to Boston involved the transfer of over 2,500 books, 100 maps and charts, and 29 volumes of his own manuscripts.

== Bowditch's American Practical Navigator ==
During his time at sea, Bowditch became intensely interested in the mathematics involved in celestial navigation. He worked initially with John Hamilton Moore's London-published Navigator, which was known to have errors. To have exact tables to work from, Bowditch recomputed all of Moore's tables, and rearranged and expanded the work. He contacted the US publisher of the work, Edmund March Blunt, who asked him to correct and revise the third edition on his fifth voyage. The task was so extensive that Bowditch decided to write his own book, and to "put down in the book nothing I can't teach the crew". On that trip, it is said that every man of the crew of 12, including the ship's cook, became competent to take and calculate lunar observations and to plot the correct position of the ship.

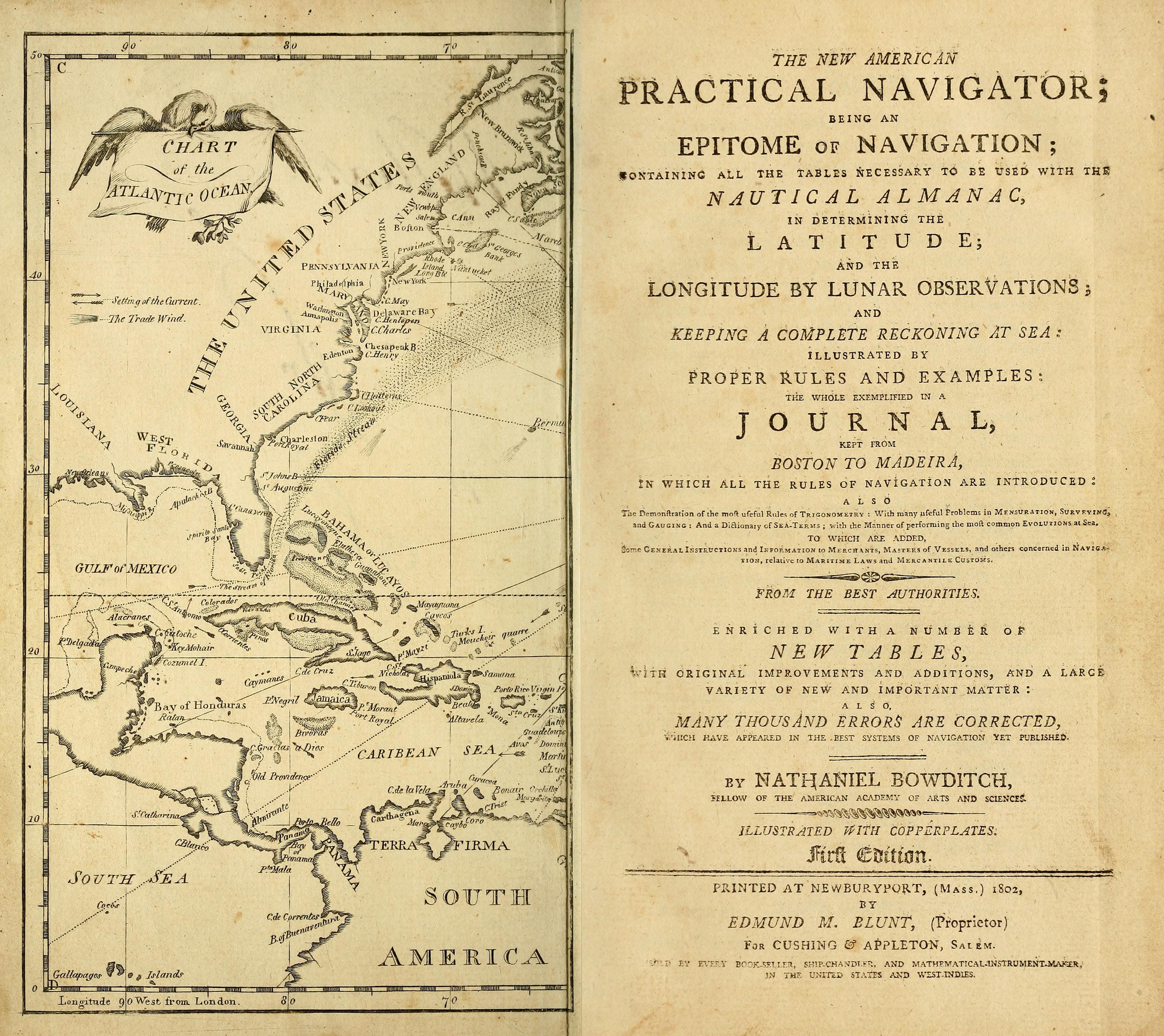
Frontispiece of the 1802 first edition of The American Practical Navigator.

In 1802 Blunt published the first edition of Bowditch's American Practical Navigator, which became the western hemisphere shipping industry standard for the next century and a half. The text included several solutions to the spherical triangle problem that were new, as well as extensive formulae and tables for navigation. In 1866, the United States Hydrographic Office purchased the copyright and since that time the book has been in continuous publication, with regular revisions to keep it current. Bowditch's influence on the American Practical Navigator was so profound that to this day mariners refer to it simply as Bowditch. Student Naval officers prior to the establishment of the Naval Academy referred to the work as "the immaculate Bowditch".

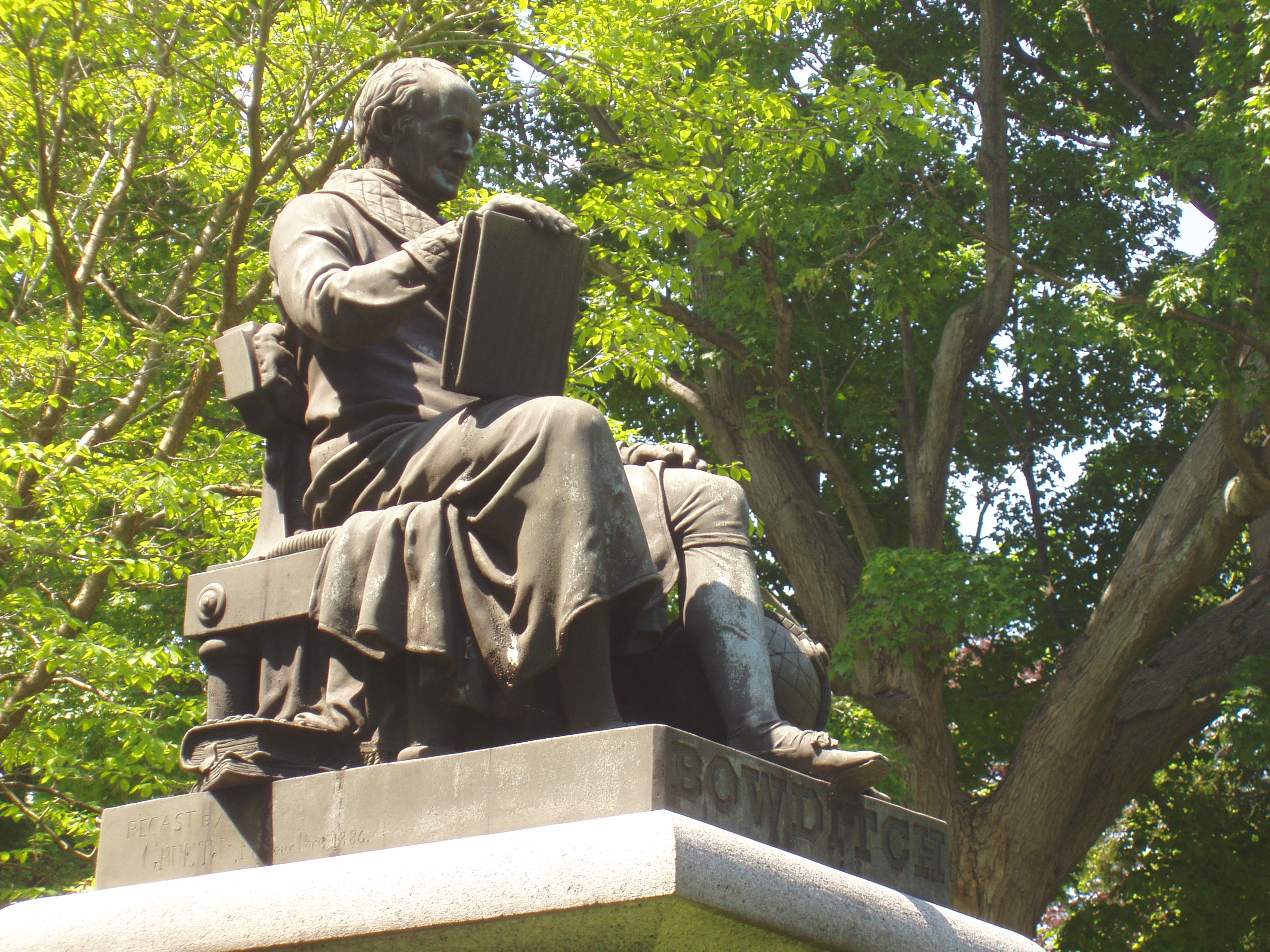
Nathaniel Bowditch's memorial statue by Robert Ball Hughes, in Mount Auburn Cemetery, Cambridge, Massachusetts.

Bowditch died in Boston in 1838 from stomach cancer. He is buried in Mount Auburn Cemetery, where a monument to him was erected through public collections.

The statue was the first life-size bronze to be cast in America. It was the creation of renowned sculptor Robert Ball Hughes.

The following eulogy was written by the Salem Marine Society:

In his death a public, a national, a human benefactor has departed. Not this community nor our country only, but the whole world has reason to do honor to his memory. When the voice of eulogy shall cease to flow, no monument will be needed to keep alive his memory among men; but as long as ships shall sail, the needle point to the north, and the stars go through their wonted courses in the heavens, the name of Dr. Bowditch will be revered as of one who has helped his fellowmen in time of need, who was and is a guide to them over the pathless oceans, and one who forwarded the great interests of mankind.

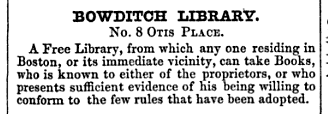
Listing for the "Bowditch Library", Boston Directory, 1848

In the 1840s and 1850s, Bowditch's son, H. I. Bowditch, ran the "Bowditch Library" on Otis Place in Boston's Financial District. It was "free to those who reside in Boston, or in the vicinity. ... This is the library of the late Nathaniel Bowditch, and is almost exclusively of a scientific character." In 1858 the family gave the collection, "which consists mostly of mathematical and astronomical works", to the Boston Public Library.

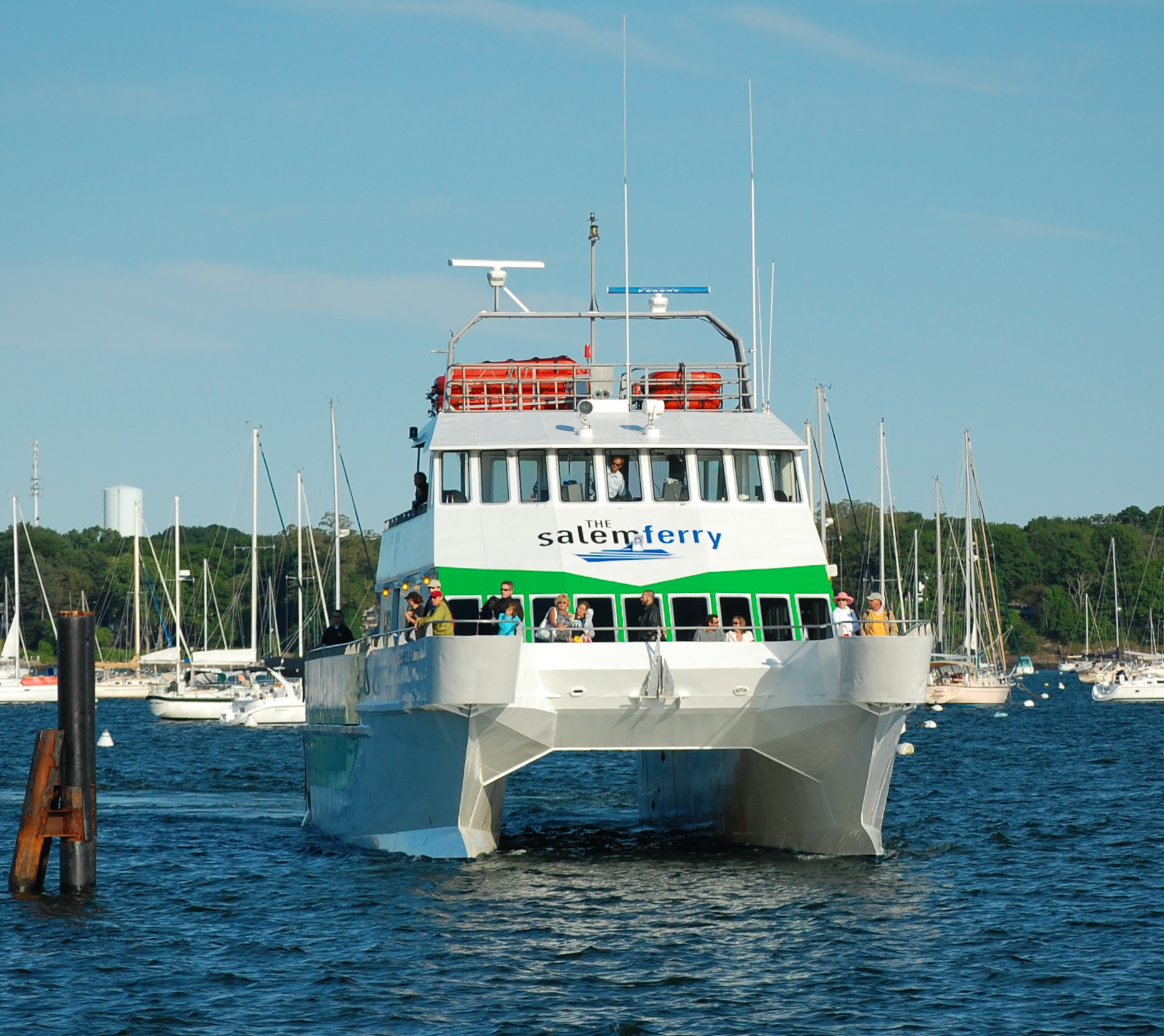
The Salem Ferry High Speed Catamaran named in honor of Nathaniel Bowditch is pictured as it is approaching its dock off Blaney Street in Salem, Massachusetts, where Nathaniel Bowditch was born

== Legacy ==
The Oceanographic Survey Ship USNS Bowditch and the Nathaniel Bowditch, a high-speed catamaran passenger ferry serving downtown Boston and Salem, were named for him, as was a lunar crater. Additionally, a William Hand–designed Schooner built in 1922, which is currently part of the Maine Windjammer fleet and sails out of Rockland, Maine, is also named after Nathaniel Bowditch.

In 1955, a book for younger readers, Carry On, Mr. Bowditch, was published by Jean Lee Latham, portraying Bowditch's life dramatized and fictionalized. A serious modern biography is Robert E. Berry's Yankee Stargazer, published in 1941. The television series Telephone Time (1956–1958) aired an episode titled "Arithmetic Sailor" which dramatized Bowditch's struggles to convince skeptical seafarers of his revolutionary method of navigation.

A grammar school, two middle schools and a dorm in America were also named for him, in Boston, Foster City, California (Bowditch Middle School), Salem, Massachusetts and Salem State College, respectively. The Department of Marine Transportation building on the grounds of the United States Merchant Marine Academy is named in his honor and houses classrooms, laboratories, and the 900-seat Ackerman Auditorium. He also gives his name to a street in Berkeley, California. Actor David Morse was named after him – David Bowditch Morse.

Bowditch Point Park, in Fort Myers Beach, Florida, is named for Bowditch.

Bowditch was inducted into the National Sailing Hall of Fame in 2014.

== See also ==
- Bowditch curve
- List of actuaries
- List of amateur mathematicians
- USS Bowditch
