= Michael S. Devany =

Former NOAA Corps Director

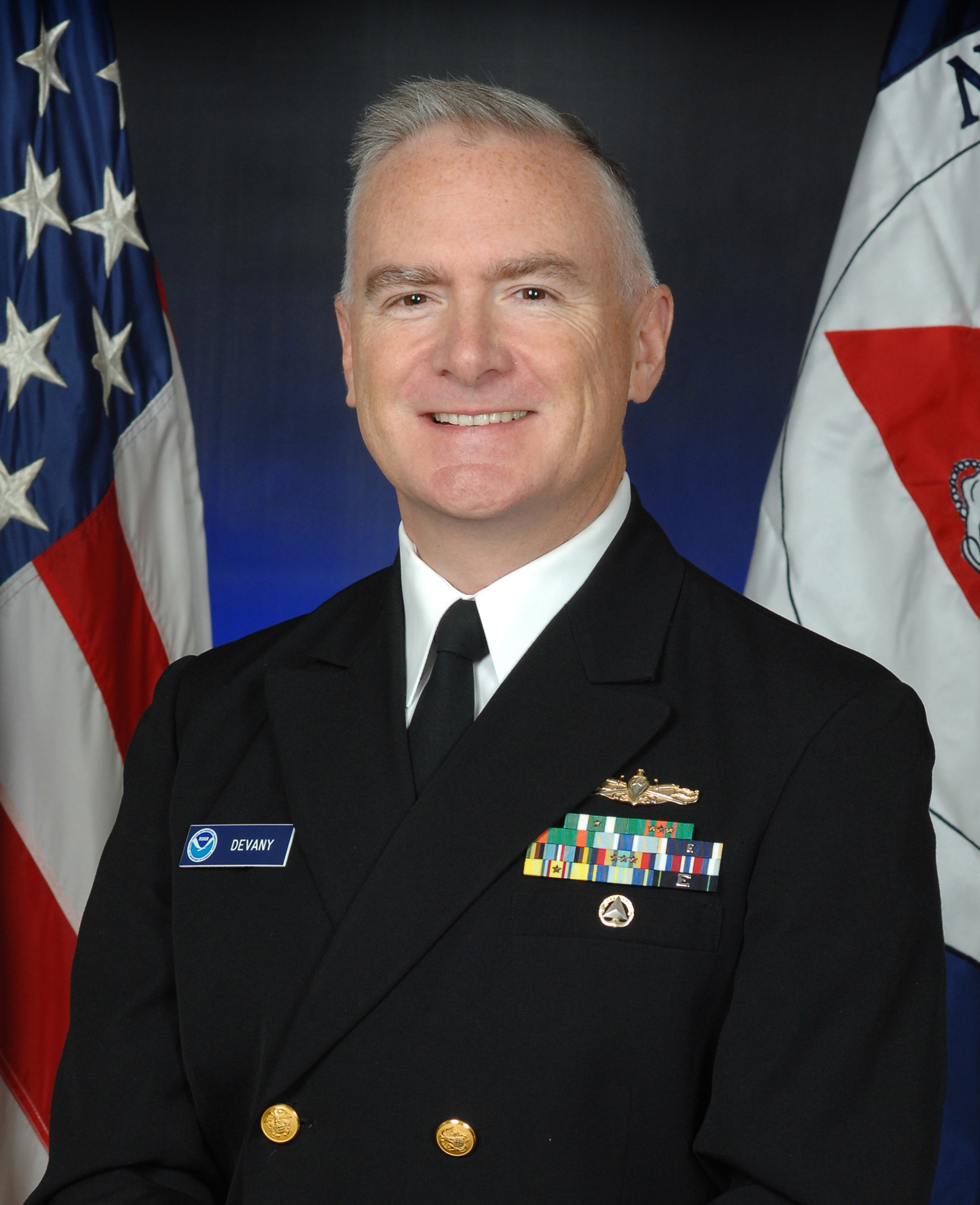
- Vice Admiral Michael S. Devany, NOAA
- Military career
- Allegiance: United States
- Branch: United States Navy; NOAA Commissioned Officer Corps
- Service years: 1986–1990 (U.S. Navy); 1990–2016 (NOAA Corps)
- Rank: Vice admiral
- Commands: NOAAS John N. Cobb (R 552); NOAAS Oscar Elton Sette (R 335); Director, NOAA Marine and Aviation Operations Centers; Director, NOAA Commissioned Corps; Deputy Under Secretary for Operations, NOAA
- Awards: NOAA Corps Meritorious Service Medal (2); NOAA Administrator's Award; NOAA Commendation Medal (3); NOAA Achievement Medal (5); Navy and Marine Corps Achievement Medal

Michael S. Devany is a former vice admiral in the NOAA Commissioned Officer Corps who last served as the Deputy Under Secretary for Operations at the National Oceanic and Atmospheric Administration from January 2, 2014 to April 2016. He previously served as director of the NOAA Commissioned Officer Corps from August 13, 2012 to January 1, 2014, succeeding RADM Jonathan W. Bailey. As deputy under secretary for operations, he was NOAA’s chief operating officer. VADM Devany was responsible for the day-to-day management of NOAA’s national and international operations for oceanic and atmospheric services, research, and coastal and marine stewardship. He is a key advisor to the under secretary of commerce for oceans and atmosphere/NOAA administrator on NOAA program and policy issues. Devany was the first NOAA Corps officer to achieve the rank of vice admiral since VADM Henry A. Karo in 1965, and the second NOAA Corps officer overall. Devany retired from NOAA in April 2016 after over 30 years of combined uniformed service.

== Career ==
Devany was an officer in the National Oceanic and Atmospheric Administration Commissioned Officer Corps (NOAA Corps), one of the eight uniformed services of the United States. He graduated from the NOAA Leadership Competencies Development Program and the Harvard University Senior Managers in Government program.

As Director, MAOC, RDML Devany was responsible for the safe, efficient, and effective operation of the NOAA ship and aircraft fleet. He oversaw NOAA’s multi-purpose oceanographic, fisheries, and hydrographic survey vessels and aircraft that operate across the globe in support of the program requirements of NOAA.

Devany received his commission in the United States Navy via the Navy ROTC in 1986. While in the Navy, he served as a surface warfare officer aboard the destroyer USS John Young (DD-973) in the Pacific and the Persian Gulf. He became an officer of the NOAA Commissioned Officer Corps in January 1990, when he transferred uniformed services. Devany received a bachelor's degree from the University of Washington in biology, and a master's degree from the University of South Florida in environmental health. He was promoted to lieutenant in April 1994, lieutenant commander in September 1999, commander in September 2004, and captain in May 2008.

Devany served aboard six NOAA ships: NOAAS Chapman (R 446), NOAAS Discoverer (R 102), NOAAS Miller Freeman (R 223), and NOAAS Hi'ialakai (R 334) in various capacities and as commanding officer of NOAAS Oscar Elton Sette (R 335) and NOAAS John N. Cobb (R 552). These vessels were involved in fisheries science and oceanographic research operations in the Atlantic, Pacific, and Gulf of Mexico. Ashore, heserved in a variety of staff, scientific, and management positions in the NOAA line offices National Marine Fisheries Service, Oceans and Atmospheric Research, Office of Marine and Aviation Operations, and National Ocean Service. He has spent a majority of his career working in assignments that directly interfaced with state and other federal agencies, using his project management and consensus building skills to achieve program objectives. VADM Devany has spent the last several years in senior Fleet operational positions, most recently as Commanding Officer, Marine Operations Center – Atlantic. He was promoted to rear admiral (lower half) in June 2011 and appointed Director, Marine and Aviation Operations Centers (MAOC), the operational arm of NOAA’s Office of Marine and Aviation Operations (OMAO). He was promoted to rear admiral in February 2012 and assumed command of the NOAA Commissioned Corps in August 2012. He was promoted to vice admiral on 2 January 2014 upon assuming duty as deputy undersecretary for operations, only the second officer to reach this rank in the combined history of the NOAA Commissioned Officer Corps and its predecessors, and the first since H. Arnold Karo in 1965.

Devany received multiple NOAA Corps Achievement Medals and the NOAA Corps Commendation Medal. Additionally, while serving in the U.S. Navy he received the Navy and Marine Corps Achievement Medal and the Armed Forces Expeditionary Medal for service in the Persian Gulf. He was a NOAA diver, and holds a United States Coast Guard 1,600-gross-ton Master, Oceans license.

== Personal life ==
VADM Devany is from the State of Washington, and he and his wife Tracy Bishop resided in Virginia with their three boys: Brendan, Kieran and Colin when he served as the deputy under secretary for operations at the NOAA. Currently, he and his wife run Lightning River Ranch outside Twisp, Washington.

== NOAA Corps dates of rank ==
Insignia									
Rank	Ensign	Lieutenant (junior grade)	Lieutenant	Lieutenant commander	Commander	Captain	Rear admiral (lower half)	Rear admiral	Vice admiral
Date of promotion	1990	1992	April 1994	September 1999	September 2004	May 2008	July 15, 2011	August 15, 2012	January 2, 2014
Reference									

== Awards and decorations ==
Navy Surface Warfare Officer badge
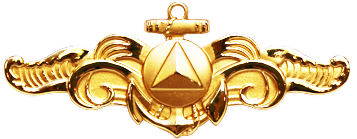
NOAA Deck Officer
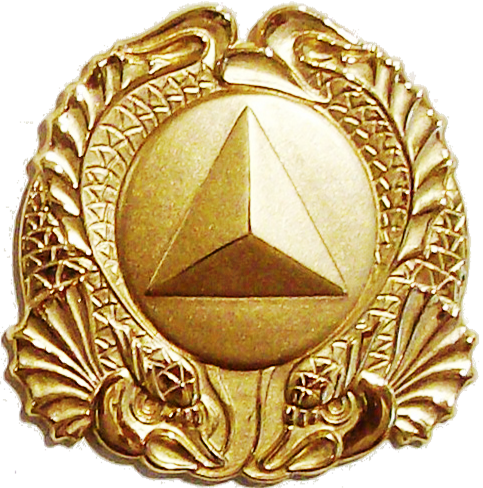
NOAA Diver insignia
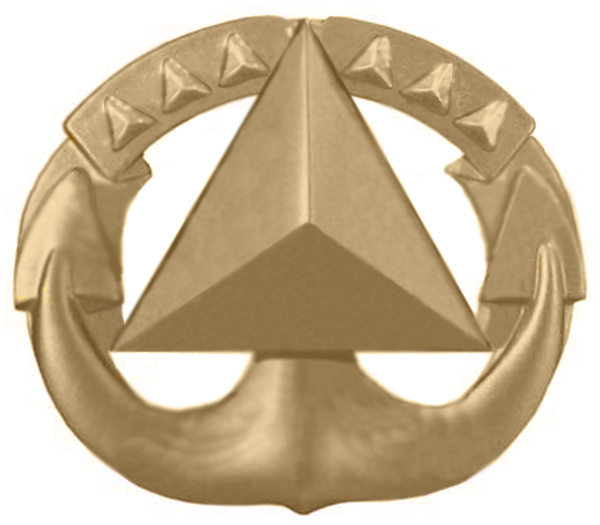
NOAA Small Craft Command Badge

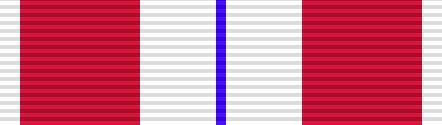
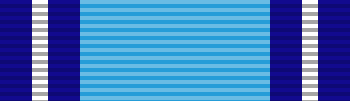
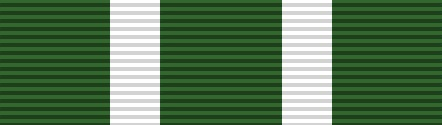
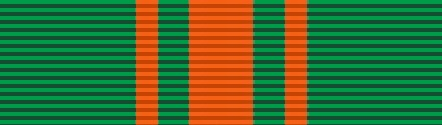
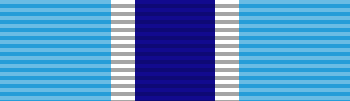
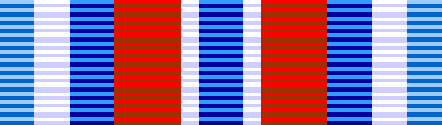
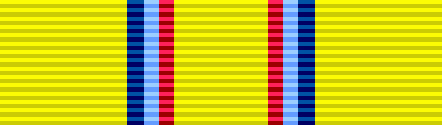
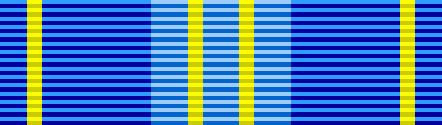
NOAA Corps Meritorious Service Medal with one gold award star
NOAA Administrator's Award
NOAA Corps Commendation Medal with 2 award stars
NOAA Corps Achievement Medal with 4 award stars
Navy and Marine Corps Achievement Medal
NOAA Unit Citation Award
Navy "E" Ribbon
Armed Forces Expeditionary Medal
Navy Sea Service Deployment Ribbon with 3 bronze service stars
NOAA Corps Atlantic Service Ribbon
NOAA Corps Pacific Service Ribbon
NOAA Corps International Service Ribbon
Navy Expert Pistol Shot Medal

Military offices
Preceded by Jonathan W. Bailey	Director of the National Oceanic and Atmospheric Administration Commissioned Corps; August 13, 2012 – January 1, 2014	Succeeded by David A. Score
Preceded by Philip M. Kenul	Director, Office of Marine and Aviation Operations; 2011–2012	Succeeded by David A. Score
