= Rick Brennan =

United States Navy officer (1968–2021)

Richard Thomas Brennan, Jr.
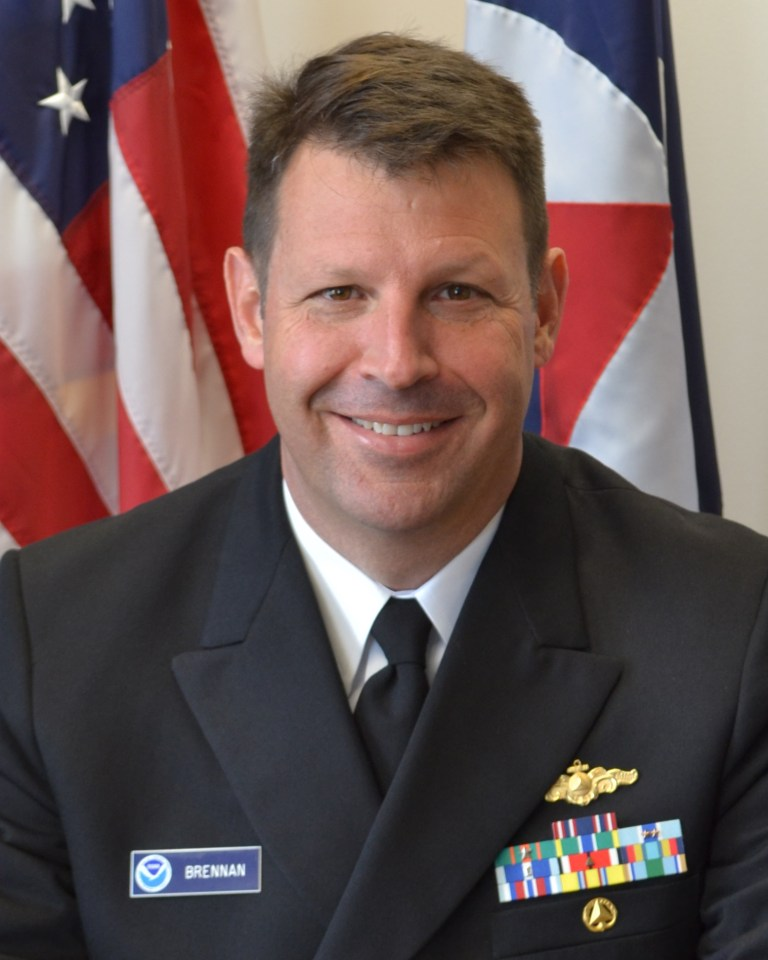
- Born: August 15, 1968
- Died: May 13, 2021 (aged 52)
- Branch: NOAA Commissioned Officer Corps
- Service years: 1992–2021
- Rank: Rear admiral (lower half)
- Commands: Director, Office of Coast Survey; Commanding Officer, NOAA Ship Rainier; Commanding Officer, NOAA Ship Rude

Richard Thomas Brennan, Jr. (August 15, 1968 – May 15, 2021) was a rear admiral in the NOAA Commissioned Officer Corps where he served as the 31st director of the Office of Coast Survey, replacing Shepard Smith. He also commanded NOAA Ship Rainier and NOAA Ship Rude.

In 2020 Brennan was elected the president of The Hydrographic Society of America. Later in 2021, he was inducted into the Hydrographer Hall of Fame. The NOAA Rear Admiral Richard T. Brennan Ocean Mapping Matching Fund program established by National Oceanic and Atmospheric Administration is named after Brennan.

== Early life and education ==
He graduated from The Citadel in Charleston, South Carolina, with a Bachelor of Science degree in Civil Engineering.

Brennan completed a Master of Science degree in Ocean Engineering at the University of New Hampshire’s Center for Coastal and Ocean Mapping.

While at UNH he developed the uncertainty component for the Tidal Constituent and Residual Interpolation model of hydrographic survey for Tidal Correction of Bathymetric Data.

== Career ==
=== Early career ===
Brennan was commissioned in the NOAA Commissioned Officer Corps in January 1992. His first assignment was to the NOAA Ship Rude, a 90-foot hydrographic vessel. In August 1992, Brennan was involved in the Rude’s survey involving the investigation of the grounding of the Queen Elizabeth 2 (QE2) in Vineyard Sound. During the survey, Brennan identified the precise rocks where the QE2 grounded, recovering metal shards of the ship’s hull from the rock.

=== Sea Assignments ===
Brennan's sea assignments include junior officer NOAA Ship Rude, operations officer NOAA Ship Rude and NOAA Ship Whiting. He was also assigned as an executive officer for NOAA Ship Fairweather, commanding officer, NOAA Ship Rude and NOAA Ship Rainier.

He also served on the U.S. Coast Guard icebreaker Healy as a member of the science team conducting bathymetric surveys in support of the United States Law of the Sea claim. In addition to his assignments at sea, he also served three years attached to hydrographic field parties, including a year on a navigation response team and two years as the officer in charge of NOAA vessel Bay Hydrographer, in the Chesapeake Bay.

=== Land Assignments ===
His land assignments included chief of Hydrographic Systems and Technology Program, the Atlantic Hydrographic Branch (AHB), and the Coast Survey Development Laboratory. He also served as chief of the OCS Hydrographic Surveys Division (HSD), in addition to 31st director of the Office of Coast Survey.

After Hurricane Irene closed the port of Norfolk, Virginia, Brennan coordinated with the NOAA and OCS to reopen the port, for which he was awarded the NOAA Corps Commendation Medal and the Department of Commerce Group Silver Medal.

Brennan was promoted to the rank of rear admiral (lower half) and the director of the Office of Coast Survey on April 20, 2021. He was the 31st director of the Office of Coast Survey, a position that started with Ferdinand Rudolph Hassler in 1807.

== Death ==
Brennan died on May 13, 2021. His funeral was held on May 21, 2021, with military honors.

== Awards and decorations ==
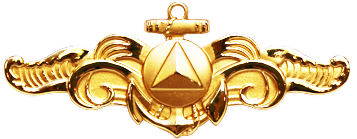
NOAA Deck Officer

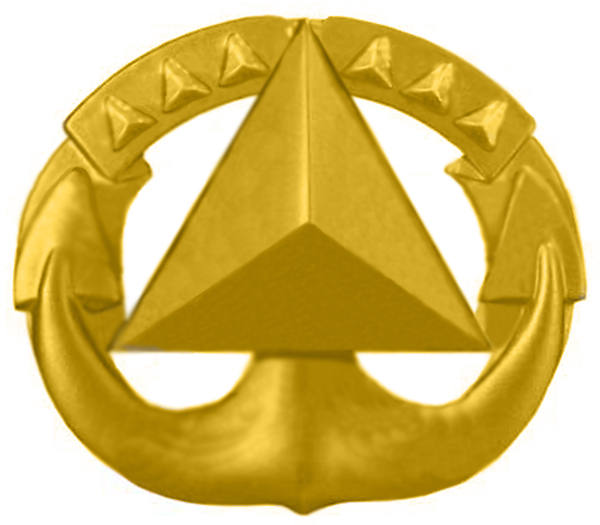
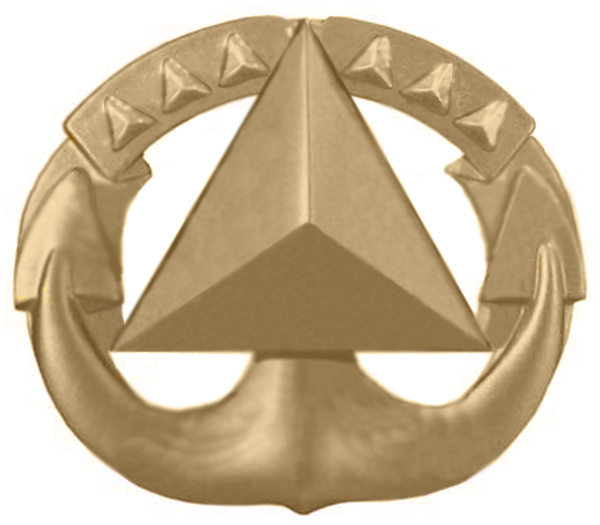
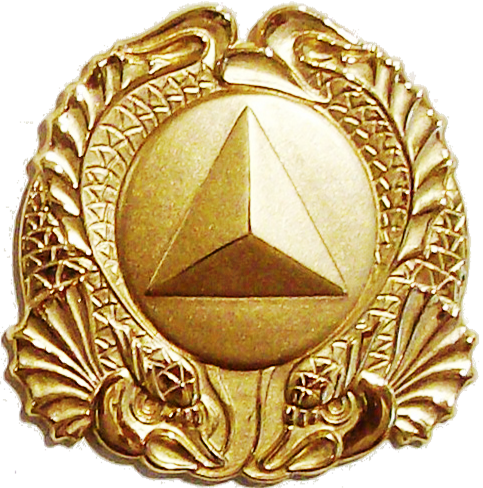
NOAA Command at Sea NOAA Small Craft Command Badge NOAA Diver insignia

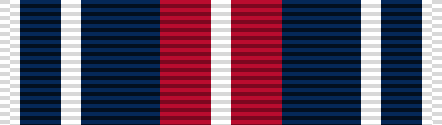
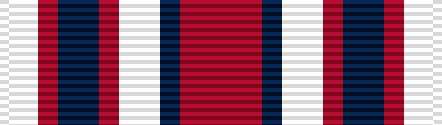
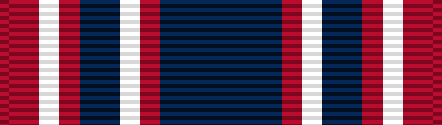
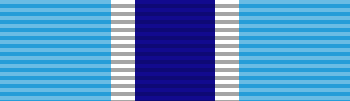
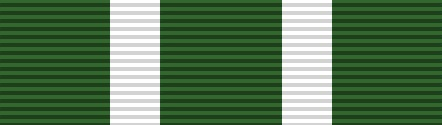
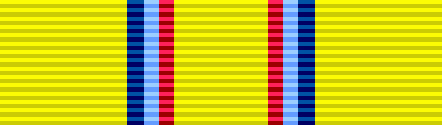
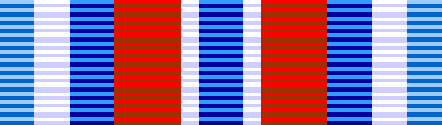
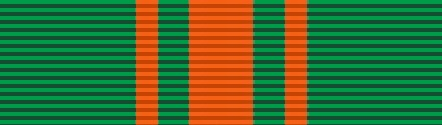
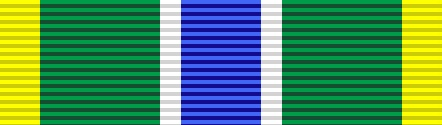
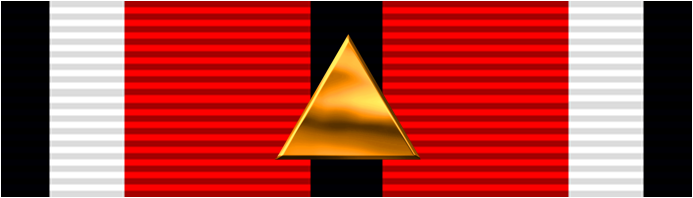
Department of Commerce Gold Medal with "O" device
Department of Commerce Silver Medal with "O" device
Department of Commerce Bronze Medal
NOAA National Response Service Ribbon
NOAA Unit Citation Award
NOAA Corps Commendation Medal
NOAA Corps Pacific Service Ribbon
NOAA Corps Atlantic Service Ribbon
NOAA Corps Achievement Medal
NOAA Corps Director's Ribbon
NOAA Corps Meritorious Service Medal
Society of American Military Engineers Karo Award
NOAA Sea Service Deployment Ribbon
