= David A. Score =

Former NOAA Corps Director

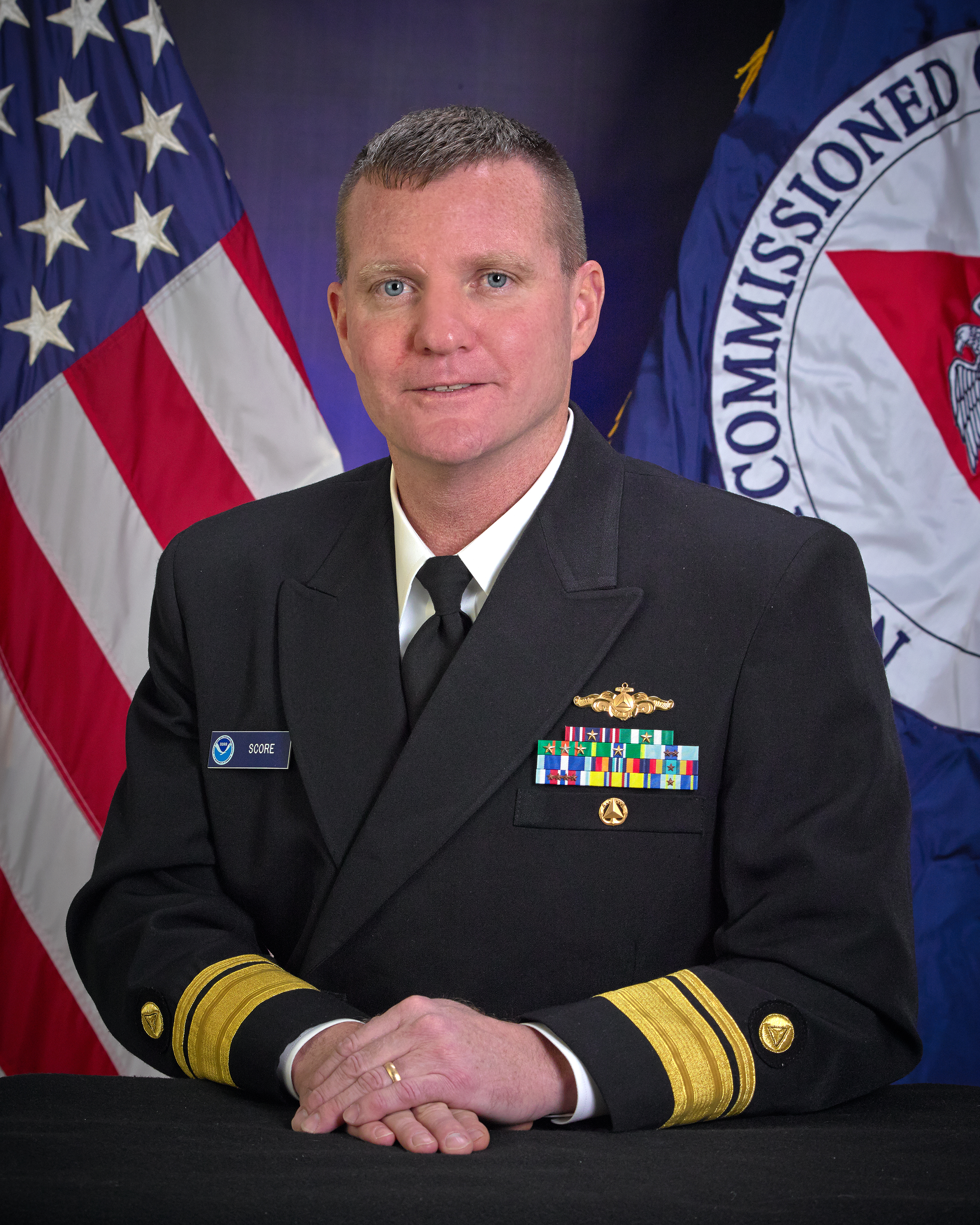
- Score in 2014
- Allegiance: United States
- Branch: NOAA Commissioned Officer Corps
- Service years: 1990–2017
- Rank: Rear admiral
- Commands: NOAA Commissioned Officer Corps; NOAA Office of Marine and Aviation Operations
- Awards: Department of Commerce Bronze Medal (2)

David A. Score is a former rear admiral in the National Oceanic and Atmospheric Administration Commissioned Officer Corps who last served as the 17th Director of NOAA Commissioned Officer Corps and NOAA Office of Marine and Aviation Operations. He retired from the NOAA Corps on September 6, 2017, after over 27 years of service.

== Early life and education ==
Score graduated in 1990 from Florida Institute of Technology in Melbourne, Florida.

== Career ==
Score was commissioned as an officer in the NOAA Commissioned Officers Corps in 1990. He served aboard six NOAA vessels, among them NOAAS Ferrel (S 492), NOAAS Miller Freeman (R 223), and NOAAS Nancy Foster (R 352). During his sea service Score served from the Caribbean Sea to the Bering Sea. Score is an accomplished diver and dive master, having supervised more than 2,000 dives. Score also served in a variety of management and operational roles at Channel Islands, Gray's Reef National Marine Sanctuary, and Florida Keys National Marine Sanctuary. He served as the superintendent of Florida Keys National Marine Sanctuary. In 1999, Score was the NOAA Association of Commissioned Officers' Junior Officer of the Year.

Score served as deputy director prior to his appointment as Director, NOAA Commissioned Officer Corps and NOAA Office of Marine and Aviation Operations beginning January 2, 2014. Prior to that assignment, he oversaw all NOAA ship fleet operations as the Director of the Office of Marine and Aviation Operations Operations Center. Score has also commanded the NOAA Marine Operations Center-Atlantic in Norfolk, Virginia and NOAAS Gordon Gunter.

== Awards and decorations ==
Score received the following awards:

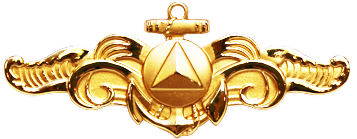
NOAA Deck Officer Badge
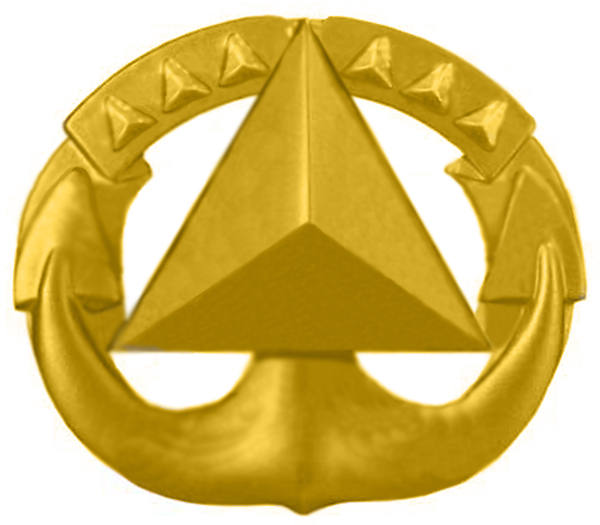
NOAA Command at Sea Badge

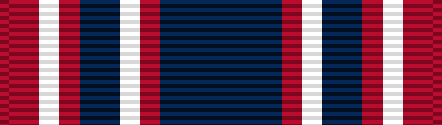
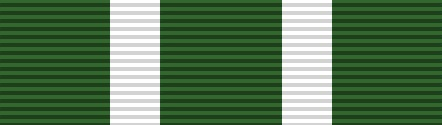
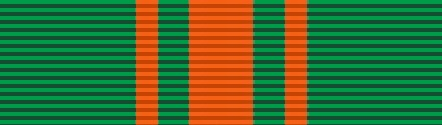
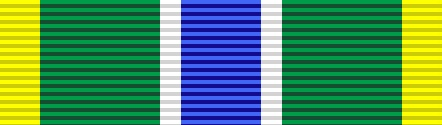
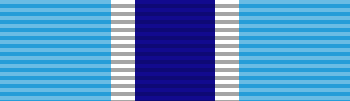
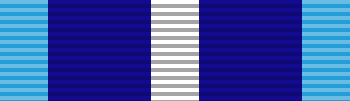
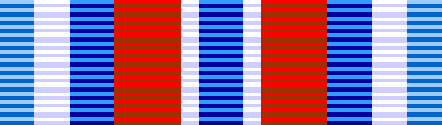
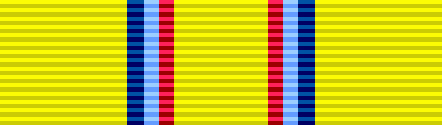
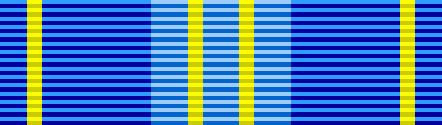
Department of Commerce Bronze Medal with one 5/16" gold star
NOAA Corps Commendation Medal with one 5/16" gold star
NOAA Corps Achievement Medal with one 5/16" silver star and two 5/16" gold stars
NOAA Corps Director's Ribbon with one 5/16" gold star
NOAA Unit Citation Award with two 3/16" bronze stars
NOAA ACO Junior Officer of the Year Award Medal
NOAA Sea Service Deployment Ribbon
Navy Sea Service Deployment Ribbon with one 3/16" bronze star
NOAA Corps Atlantic Service Ribbon with four 3/16" bronze stars
NOAA Corps Pacific Service Ribbon
NOAA Corps International Service Ribbon with one 3/16" bronze star

Military offices
Preceded by Michael S. Devany	Director of the National Oceanic and Atmospheric Administration Commissioned Corps; 2 January 2014–6 September 2017	Succeeded by Michael J. Silah
Preceded by Michael S. Devany	Commander, NOAA Marine Operations Center–Atlantic; 2011–2012	Succeeded by Anita L. Lopez
