= Anita L. Lopez =

NOAA official

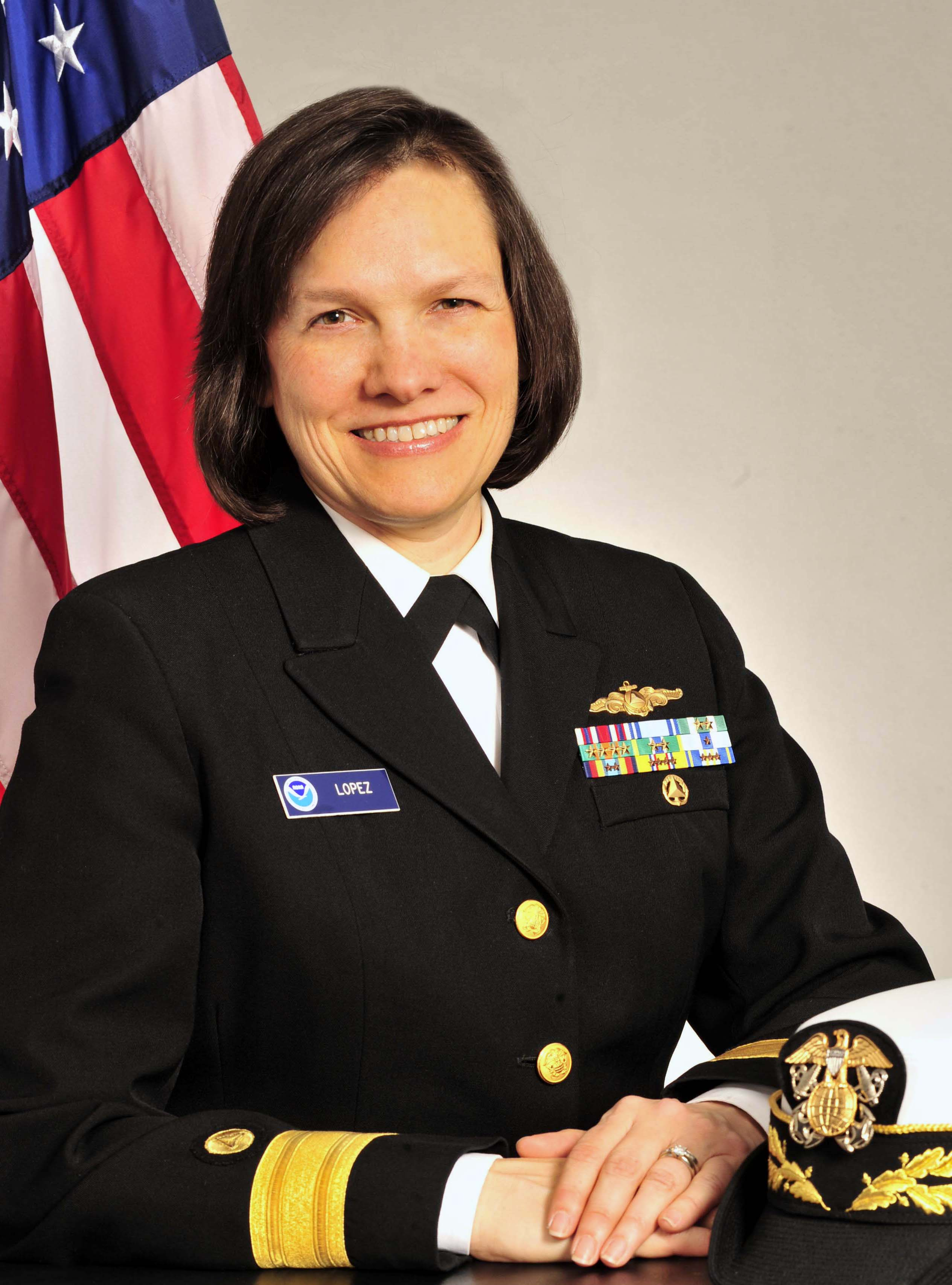
- Military career
- Allegiance: United States
- Branch: NOAA Commissioned Officer Corps
- Service years: 1991–2018
- Rank: Rear admiral (lower half)
- Commands: Deputy Director of the NOAA Commissioned Officer Corps; Deputy Director for Operations, NOAA Office of Marine and Aviation Operations; NOAAS Oscar Elton Sette
- Awards: Department of Commerce Silver Medal; NOAA Administrator's Award; NOAA Corps Commendation Medal (3); NOAA Corps Achievement Medal (5)

Anita L. Lopez is a former officer of the National Oceanic and Atmospheric Administration Commissioned Officer Corps. She last served as the deputy director of the NOAA Commissioned Officer Corps and deputy director for Operations of NOAA's Office of Marine and Aviation Operations. She previously served as the commanding officer of NOAA's Marine Operations Center–Atlantic in Norfolk, Virginia from June 2012 to January 2014. Lopez retired form the NOAA Corps on March 1, 2018. Since 2018, she has been serving as the Director of Research Vessel Operations at the University of Hawaii and the Interim Director of Diversity Equity and Inclusion at the School of Ocean and Earth Science and Technology (SOEST).

== Early life and education ==
Lopez grew up in Pasadena, California. Her father's family is of Yaqui descent. As a youth, Lopez was a member of an Explorer Post at the Jet Propulsion Laboratory. She credits this involvement in developing her interest in engineering. Lopez earned a Bachelor of Science in electronic engineering technology in 1989 from DeVry University and a certification in project management in 1996 from the University of Washington. Lopez first took a job in the private sector as an installation engineer in the semiconductor manufacturing industry in Japan and South Korea. In 1991, Lopez graduated from the 89th NOAA Basic Officer Training Class and gained appointment as an ensign in the NOAA Commissioned Officer Corps.

== Career ==
University of Hawaii Marine Center—2018-current

Serves as the Principal Investigator for the University of Hawai'i Marine Center. As the program manager, she has overall responsibility for the operation and maintenance of the oceanographic research vessels, small boats, submersibles, oceanographic research instrumentation, and facilities supporting ships and boats at the University of Hawai‘i (UH). This includes interfacing with Federal and State agencies concerning funding, scheduling, and regulation of UH marine facilities and operations as well as managing the buildings and piers leased from the Department of Transportation - Harbors for vessel operational support, ensuring that it is operated in compliance with State and Federal regulations. Strategic in thought and forward looking she is focused on planning for replacement of research vessels, acquiring new platforms, and other facilities to support the state’s oceanographic research initiatives. She is fiscally responsible for planning, development, and execution of all federal grants, state funding, and service contracts within the program totaling approximately $14.5M annually. A team oriented leader, she is responsible for the safety and well-being of approximately 65 shore-side and underway employees; ensuring all personnel are operational risk minded in their actions, well trained, and valued in their job assignments. Chairs the Ship Operations Subcommittee of the SOEST Research Council, coordinating operations with the needs of UH faculty. Voted member on the University – National Oceanographic Laboratory System (UNOLS) Council 2018-current. https://www.unols.org/committee/unols-council Active in the local community supporting ocean safety and conservation, serves as a Board of Director of a local non-profit Na Kama Kai. https://nakamakai.org/

NOAA 1991 - 2018 Lopez's NOAA career has been focused on fisheries management, oceanographic research, operational support, risk analysis, as well as program and project management. Lopez has served for more than nine years at sea, aboard eight NOAA ships. She has served full sea tours aboard NOAA Ships Discoverer, David Starr Jordan, Miller Freeman and as Commanding Officer of NOAAS Oscar Elton Sette. While commanding Oscar Elton Sette, Lopez was recognized for personal and professional excellence for, "proactive activities leading to the timely and potentially life saving decision to evacuate 17 federal employees, contractors, and volunteers from remote island camps in the Papahanaumokuakea National Monument in advance of Hurricane Neki."

Ashore, Lopez has held positions at NOAA headquarters, the Pacific Marine Environmental Laboratory, the National Marine Mammal Laboratory, the Marine Operations Center–Pacific, and as the Executive Director to NOAA's Deputy Under Secretary of Operations from February 2011 to May 2012. From June 2012 to January 2014, Lopez served as Commanding Officer, NOAA Marine Operations Center–Atlantic.

Sworn-in and promoted by Secretary of Commerce Penny Pritzker on January 2, 2014, Lopez served as Deputy Director of the NOAA Commissioned Officer Corps and as Deputy Director for Operations of NOAA's Office of Marine and Aviation Operations (OMAO). In that capacity, Lopez was responsible for the direct leadership and management of operations of the NOAA's fleet of ships and aircraft, as well as the management of NOAA's 321 commissioned officers and nearly 1,000 civilian personnel assigned to OMAO.

== Awards and decorations ==
Lopez was awarded the following medals:

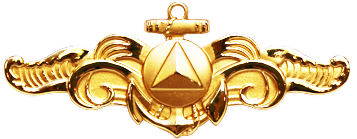
NOAA Deck Officer Badge
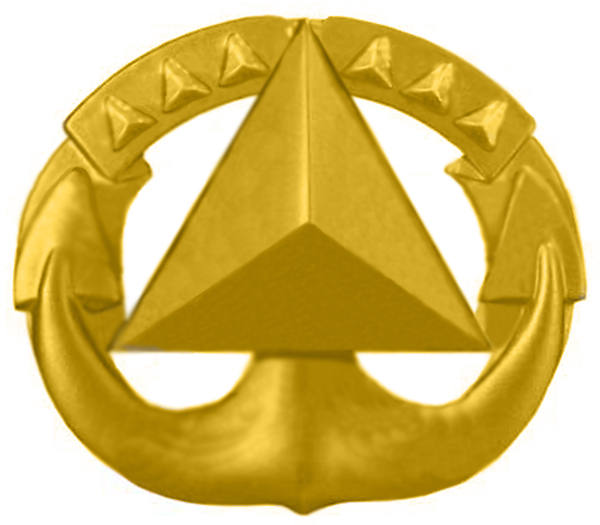
NOAA Command at Sea Badge

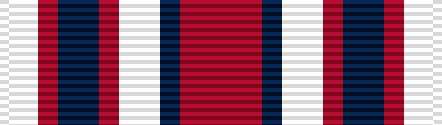
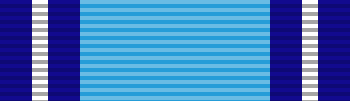
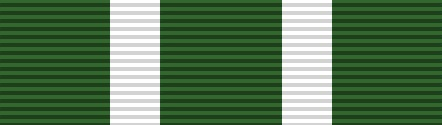
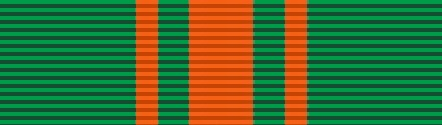
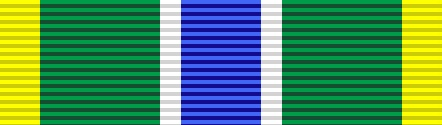
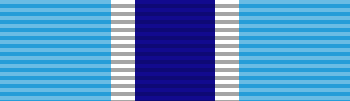
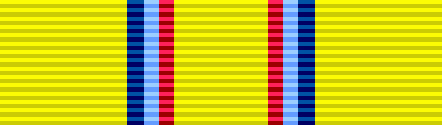
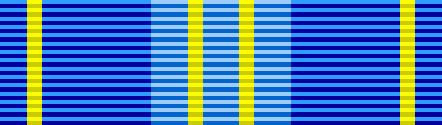
Department of Commerce Silver Medal
NOAA Administrator's Award
NOAA Corps Commendation Medal with two 5/16 inch gold stars
NOAA Corps Achievement Medal with four 5/16" gold stars
NOAA Corps Director's Ribbon with two 5/16" gold stars
NOAA Unit Citation Award with 3/16" bronze star
Navy Sea Service Deployment Ribbon with two 3/16" bronze stars
NOAA Corps Pacific Service Ribbon with four 3/16" bronze stars
NOAA Corps International Service Ribbon with three 3/16" bronze stars

Military offices
Preceded by David A. Score	Deputy Director of the NOAA Commissioned Corps; Deputy Director for Operations of NOAA Office of Marine and Aviation Operations; January 2, 2014 – March 1, 2018	Succeeded by Nancy Hann
Preceded by David A. Score	Commander, NOAA Marine Operations Center–Atlantic; 2012–2014	Succeeded by Anne K. Lynch
