= Jonathan W. Bailey =

Former NOAA Corps Director

Jonathan Bailey
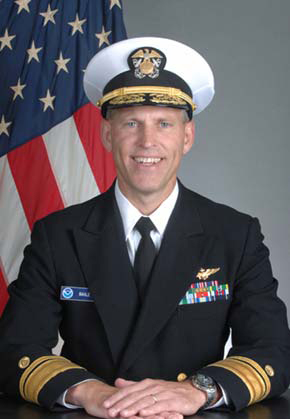
- Allegiance: United States
- Branch: NOAA Commissioned Officer Corps
- Service years: 1979–2012
- Rank: Rear Admiral
- Commands: NOAA Commissioned Officer Corps; NOAA Office of Marine and Aviation Operations
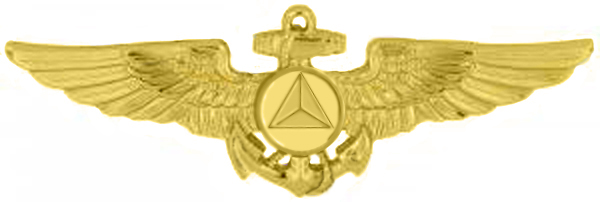
- Awards: Department of Commerce Gold Medal; Department of Commerce Bronze Medal

Bailey's farewell message to the NOAA Corps in 2012

Jonathan W. Bailey is a retired rear admiral in the NOAA Commissioned Officer Corps and a former director, NOAA Commissioned Officer Corps and director, NOAA Office of Marine and Aviation Operations. He was appointed by Secretary of Commerce Carlos M. Gutierrez on October 1, 2007, after nomination for the position by President George W. Bush, confirmation by the U.S. Senate, and subsequent promotion by the Secretary to the two-star rank of rear admiral. On August 15, 2012, Admiral Bailey was succeeded as Director, NOAA Corps by Rear Admiral Michael S. Devany, and formally retired on September 30, 2012.

A commissioned officer for over 30 years, Bailey has had a balanced operational career, with seven years of sea duty aboard five NOAA ships and almost nine years of flight duty piloting three NOAA aircraft.

From 2005 to 2007, Bailey served as executive director to the Deputy Under Secretary of Commerce for Oceans and Atmosphere. In 2003, he became director of the Commissioned Personnel Center, where he directed the management of a complex system of policies, including compensation and benefits. His efforts had positive impact across the Service. Admiral Bailey played a critical role in developing innovative strategies to improve the NOAA Corps workforce. These strategies included the establishment of NOAA Corps core values, new officer evaluation and billet systems, deployment of technological improvements, and new training to educate officers and supervisors about NOAA Corps policies.

In 1999, he became the chief of NOAA’s National Ocean Service Remote Sensing Division. There he led technology advancement in the simultaneous collection and processing of digital aerial photography, airborne laser mapping data, and airborne imaging spectroscopy for NOAA’s shoreline mapping program and the Federal Aviation Administration’s Airport Survey Program. He also introduced innovative processes for rapid shoreline change detection to correct gross nautical chart anomalies in a very short period of time. At the time of the September 11 terrorist attacks, he oversaw NOAA’s aerial- and ground-based mapping operations that aided search and recovery efforts at the World Trade Center and Pentagon. He received the Commerce Gold Medal group award for technical skill and coordination in 2002 for his role following the attacks.

Admiral Bailey has a master's degree in aeronautical science and a bachelor's degree in natural resources. He is a graduate of Harvard’s Senior Executive Fellows and The Art and Practice of Leadership Development programs. Bailey lives in Maryland with his wife Cindy and their three sons.

== Awards and decorations ==
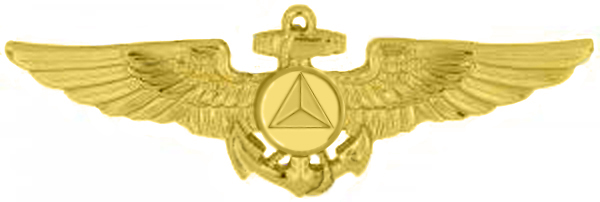
NOAA Aviator Badge

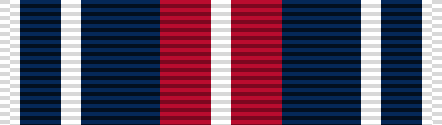
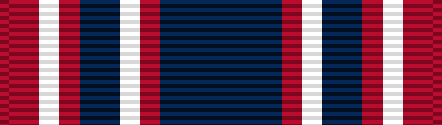
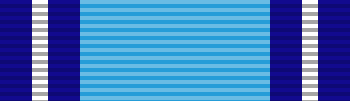
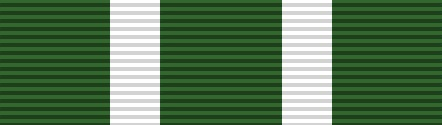
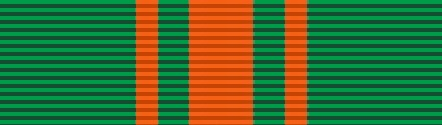
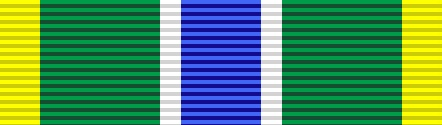
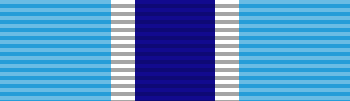
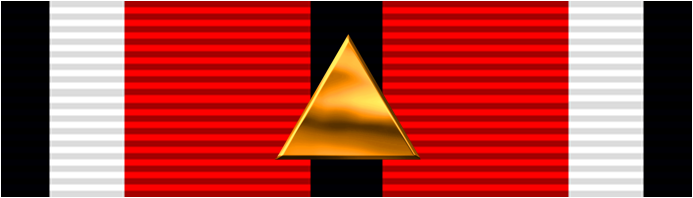
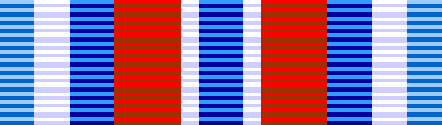
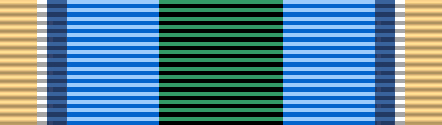
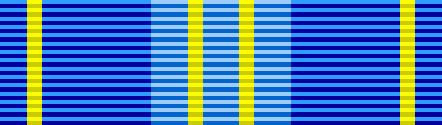
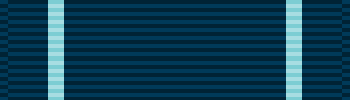
Department of Commerce Gold Medal
Department of Commerce Bronze Medal
NOAA Administrator's Award
NOAA Corps Commendation Medal
NOAA Corps Achievement Medal with four gold award stars
NOAA Corps Director's Ribbon
NOAA Unit Citation Award
Society of American Military Engineers Karo Award with bronze Triangle Device
NOAA Corps Atlantic Service Ribbon with two service stars
NOAA Corps Mobile Duty Service Ribbon
NOAA Corps International Service Ribbon
NOAA Pistol Ribbon

== Notes ==
Military offices
Preceded by Samuel De Bow	Director of the National Oceanic and Atmospheric Administration Commissioned Corps; 2007–2012	Succeeded by Michael S. Devany
