= Michael J. Silah =

Former NOAA Corps Director

Michael Silah
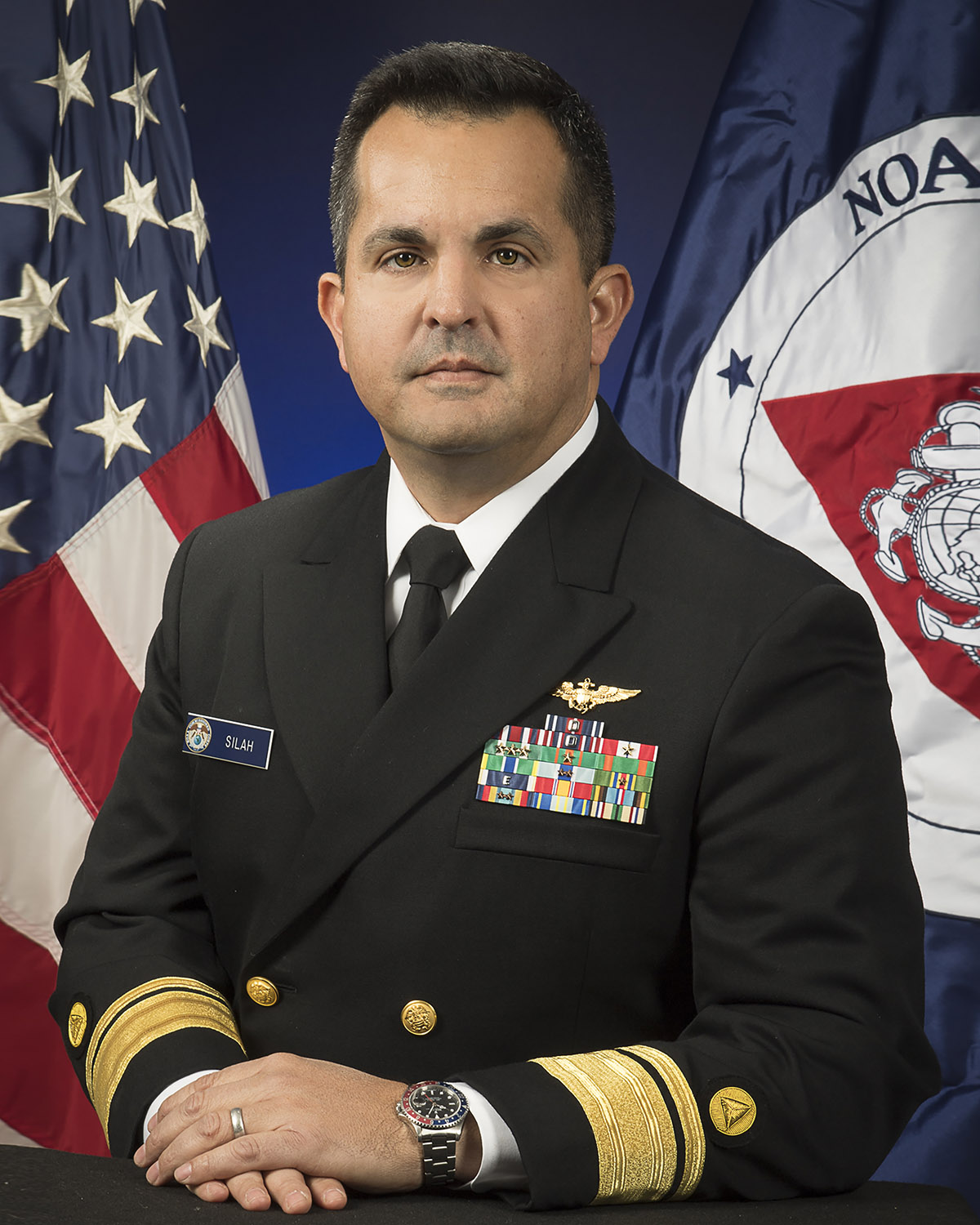
- Allegiance: United States
- Branch: United States Navy; NOAA Commissioned Officer Corps
- Service years: 1992–2002 (U.S. Navy); 2002–2021 (NOAA Corps)
- Rank: Rear Admiral
- Commands: NOAA Commissioned Officer Corps; NOAA Office of Marine and Aviation Operations
- Awards: Department of Commerce Gold Medal with O device Department of Commerce Silver Medal; Department of Commerce Bronze Medal with O device
- Alma mater: Duke University (BA); Harvard University (MPA)

Michael J. Silah is a retired rear admiral in the NOAA Commissioned Officer Corps who served as Director, NOAA Commissioned Officer Corps, and Director, NOAA Office of Marine and Aviation Operations.

== Early life and education ==
Silah attended Chamberlain High School in Tampa, Florida and graduated in 1988 where he was voted “Most Likely to Succeed”. Silah holds a bachelor's degree in economics from Duke University and a master's degree in public administration from the John F. Kennedy School of Government at Harvard University.

== Career ==
=== United States Navy ===
Silah was commissioned as an officer in the United States Navy in 1992. A Lockheed P-3 Orion pilot, he served as squadron safety officer in Patrol Squadron Nine (VP-9) and completed three deployments to Southeast Asia and the Persian Gulf. He also served in the Naval Force Aircraft Test Squadron (FORCE).

=== NOAA Corps ===
Silah transferred to the NOAA Corps in 2002. During his NOAA Corps career, he has served as chief of staff of the National Centers for Environmental Prediction (NCEP), as chief of staff of the NOAA Office of Marine and Aviation Operations, and as aide-de-camp to the Administrator of the National Oceanic and Atmospheric Administration.

Before becoming Director of the NOAA Corps, Silah served as commanding officer of NOAA's Aircraft Operations Center (AOC). Under his command, AOC improved its mission execution rate to over 90 percent and flew over 6,000 flight hours in support of NOAA missions. During his tour as its commanding officer, the AOC received the Department of Commerce Silver Medal, the Department of Commerce Bronze Medal, a NOAA Unit Citation Award, and the Safety Management System Level 3 Award, which is the highest possible distinction. He also oversaw AOC's relocation from MacDill Air Force Base in Tampa, Florida, to a new facility at Lakeland Linder International Airport in Lakeland, Florida, in 2017.

On 14 August 2017, NOAA announced that President Donald Trump had approved United States Secretary of Commerce Wilbur Ross’s selection of Silah to serve as director of the NOAA Commissioned Officer Corps and NOAA’s Office of Marine and Aviation Operations. Promoted to rear admiral, Silah assumed command of both on 6 September 2017, when he relieved the retiring Rear Admiral David A. Score.

During his U.S. Navy and NOAA Corps years combined, Silah has flown over 3,000 flight hours in the P-3 Orion, over 1,500 of them as pilot-in-command, over 500 hours of U.S. Navy flight testing, and nearly 150 penetrations of hurricanes as a "hurricane hunter."

He retired from the NOAA on April 1, 2021 after 28 years of service in both the Navy and NOAA, signing on as a senior advisor to Wellington Dupont Public Affairs.

== Awards and decorations ==
Silah has received the following awards:

Naval Aviator insignia

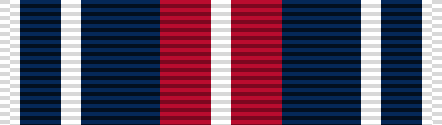
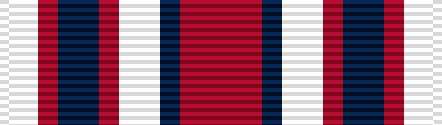
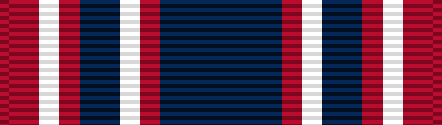
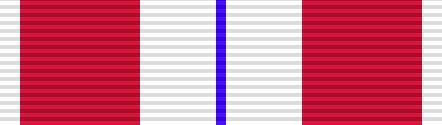
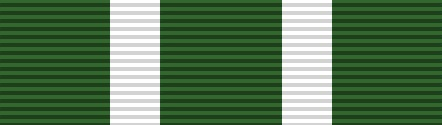
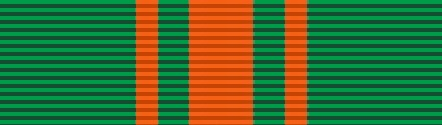
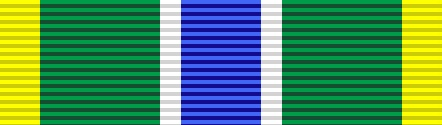
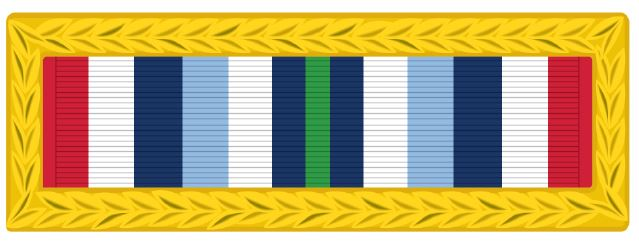
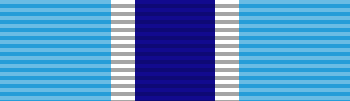
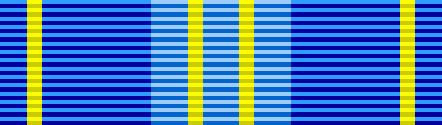
Department of Commerce Gold Medal with "Organization" device
Department of Commerce Silver Medal
Department of Commerce Bronze Medal with "O" device
NOAA Corps Meritorious Service Medal with one gold award star
NOAA Corps Commendation Medal with three award stars
NOAA Corps Achievement Medal with award star
Navy and Marine Corps Achievement Medal
NOAA Corps Director's Ribbon
Department of Homeland Security Outstanding Unit Award
NOAA Unit Citation Award with two bronze service stars
Navy Meritorious Unit Commendation with one service star
Navy "E" Ribbon with one Battle E device
National Defense Service Medal with one service star
Armed Forces Expeditionary Medal
Southwest Asia Service Medal
Navy Sea Service Deployment Ribbon with two service stars
NOAA Corps International Service Ribbon

== Professional associations ==
Silah is an active member of The Explorers Club.

Military offices
Preceded by David A. Score	Director of the National Oceanic and Atmospheric Administration Commissioned Corps; 2017–2021	Succeeded by Nancy Hann
