= NMML =

NMML may refer to:

- National Marine Mammal Laboratory, a United States research laboratory
- Nehru Memorial Museum & Library in New Delhi
