= Admiral Lopez =

Admiral Lopez may refer to:

- Anita L. Lopez (fl. 1980s–2010s), NOAA Commissioned Officer Corps rear admiral
- Robert F. Lopez (1857–1936), U.S. Navy rear admiral
- Thomas J. Lopez (born 1940), U.S. Navy admiral
