= Admiral Bailey (disambiguation) =

Admiral Bailey (fl. 1980s–1990s) is a Jamaican dance hall deejay. Admiral Bailey may also refer to:

- Jonathan W. Bailey (fl. 1970s–2010s), NOAA Commissioned Officer Corps rear admiral
- Sidney Bailey (1882–1942), British Royal Navy admiral
- Theodorus Bailey (officer) (1805–1877), U.S. Navy rear admiral

== See also ==
- William Baillie-Hamilton (1803–1881), British Royal Navy admiral
