= Philip M. Kenul =

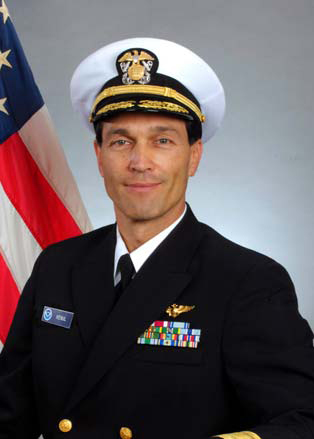
- Rear Admiral Philip M. Kenul, NOAA
- Allegiance: United States of America
- Branch: NOAA Commissioned Officer Corps
- Service years: 1981 - 2011
- Rank: Rear admiral (lower half)
- Commands: Director, NOAA Marine and Aviation Operations Centers
- Awards: Meritorious Service Medal

Philip M. Kenul is a retired NOAA Corps rear admiral (lower half) who last served as the Director, NOAA Marine and Aviation Operations Centers, which are part of National Oceanic and Atmospheric Administration’s Office of Marine and Aviation Operations (OMAO). As director, Kenul was responsible for the operation of NOAA aircraft and ships as well as the management of OMAO’s operations centers’ $100M budget and more than 500 fleet personnel. Kenul retired from the NOAA Corps after over 30 years of service.

== Career ==
Kenul was appointed into the NOAA Corps in 1981. His first tour was aboard NOAA hydrographic survey ship NOAAS Whiting; he then served as chief of a shore-based hydrographic field party surveying in the Gulf of Mexico. In 1985, he received flight training through NOAA's Aircraft Operations Center, and most of his career since then has been focused on NOAA aviation. Kenul flew light aircraft in support of aeronautical charting and photogrammetry while also serving as chief of those respective branches. He then trained with the Navy to become a P-3 aircraft pilot, and served with the Operations Branch, Naval Research Laboratory. There he supervised 22 Naval officers and 90 enlisted personnel, and was responsible for the worldwide deployment of five Navy P-3 research aircraft. In 1996, he reported to NOAA's Aircraft Operations Center, where he served consecutive positions covering aircraft operations as Heavy Aircraft Coordinator, Special Projects Officer, Chief of Flight Management, and Chief of the Aircraft Maintenance Branch. During this time he also served as a NOAA hurricane hunter pilot, flying P-3s into the eyewall of hurricanes to acquire the meteorological data needed by forecasters to make accurate hurricane predictions—one of only a handful of pilots in the world qualified to fly P-3s into hurricanes.

Kenul was selected in 2001 for NOAA's first Leadership Competency Development Program. The following year, he was named the first Director of NOAA's newly established Homeland Security Office, which was also one of the first NOAA-wide matrix programs. There he was responsible for coordinating the delivery of NOAA's products, services, and capabilities to Federal, state, and local emergency managers and responders, and strengthening NOAA's own infrastructure to protect agency personnel, facilities, and information services. In this capacity he positioned NOAA to be a recognized and vital contributor to the Nation's Homeland Security effort.

Kenul assumed command of the Aircraft Operations Center in 2006, where he oversaw the daily operations of NOAA's light and heavy aircraft. NOAA aircraft conduct such operations as snow surveys to support hydrological forecasts of flooding and drought; marine mammal assessments, including endangered right whale surveys; remote sensing in support of homeland security; aeronautical charting; and disaster assessments following extreme weather events.

He joined TriVector Services in March 2011.

He joined the ECS in March 2019.

Military offices
Preceded by Richard R. Behn	Director, Marine and Aviation Operations Centers; 2007-2011	Succeeded by Michael S. Devany
