= NOAA Administrator's Award =

US government award for meteorology chief

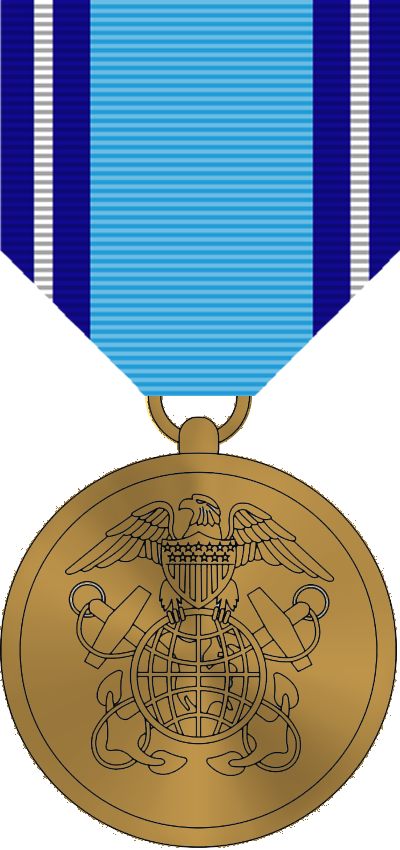
- Obverse of the medal for members of the NOAA Corps
- Type: Honorary and monetary award
- Awarded for: Significant contributions to NOAA programs.
- Country: United States
- Presented by: the Under Secretary of Commerce for Oceans and Atmosphere
- Eligibility: Employees of NOAA and members of the NOAA Corps.
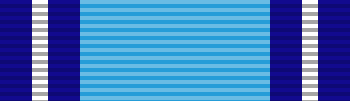
- Ribbon

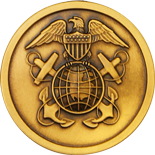
- Obverse

NOAA Corps Order of Wear
- Next (higher): NOAA Corps Meritorious Service Medal
- Next (lower): NOAA Corps Commendation Medal

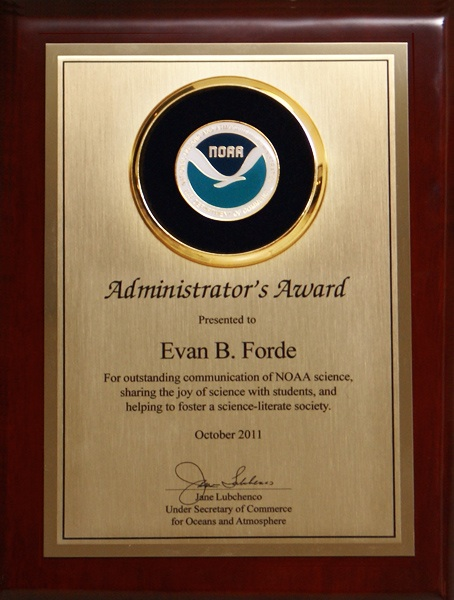
Evan Forde's NOAA Administrator's Award plaque

The NOAA Administrator's Award is an award of the National Oceanic and Atmospheric Administration (NOAA). The award is granted by the Under Secretary of Commerce for Oceans and Atmosphere, who serves concurrently as the Administrator of the National Oceanic and Atmospheric Administration. The award, which may go to an individual or a group, is presented in recognition of significant contributions to NOAA programs. The award is presented to civilian employees of NOAA as a plaque and as a medal set to members of the NOAA Commissioned Officer Corps. Individual recipients of the award receive a monetary award of $5,000. Recipients of group awards split the monetary award evenly. Administrator's Award recipients are formally recognized at an award ceremony held annually.

== Award criteria ==
The NOAA Administrator's Award is granted to recognize recognition of significant contributions to NOAA programs. Eligible contributions must be in the areas of Equal Employment Opportunity, program management, scientific research, public service, engineering development, environmental conservation, policy development, administrative support, public affairs, and information systems. Nominations for the Administrator's Award are reviewed by the NOAA Incentive Awards Board (NIAB). During the board's review of the nomination the following factors are considered:

- The importance of the cited contribution, as well as the urgency of its need, to NOAA programs
- How unique and original is the cited contribution
- Did the cited contribution bring unusual credit to NOAA and Department of Commerce (DOC)
- Did the contribution result in an unusually important and clearly demonstrated improvement in a NOAA program
- In the case of nominated supervisors, did the cited contribution demonstrate significant leadership skills
- Did exceptional leadership, skill, ingenuity, or ability displayed in administration or performance of duties accomplish significant savings in money, time, staff resources, or equipment
- Creation or development of a major improvement in a service which results in a high degree of benefit to NOAA or DOC
- Successful implementation of new or improved policies in NOAA
- Exceptional skill and ingenuity in focusing on policy needs
- Contributions in engineering development in the areas of applied technology systems or equipment developed
- Important scientific research contributions
- Excellence in program and/or project planning which includes developing a clear concept based on mission requirements, developing a plan, including cost, schedule, and performance milestones, and the completion of predetermined milestones

== Medal appearance ==
The NOAA Administrator's Award Medal is made of red brass with a matte finish. The medal is 32 millimetres (1.3 in) in diameter. It hangs from a ring suspension. The ribbon is 35 millimetres (1.4 in) wide primarily of forget-me-not blue. The edges are 8 millimetres (0.31 in) wide ultramarine blue, bisected by a white stripe of 1.6 millimetres (0.063 in). Subsequent awards are denoted by 5/16 inch gold award stars.

== Notable recipients ==
- Harold E. Brooks
- Evan Forde
- Christopher Landsea
- Anita L. Lopez
- Michael S. Devany
- Isidoro Orlanski
- Stephanie Herring
- Angelica Gutierrez
