= U.S. Department of Commerce, Office of Inspector General =

United States Department of Commerce, Office of Inspector General
- Seal of the U.S. Department of Commerce OIG
- Incumbent; Duane Townsend; Acting since July 7, 2025
- United States Department of Commerce
- Seat: Washington, D.C.
- Formation: 1978
- First holder: Guy W. Chamberlin Jr.
- Website: www.oig.doc.gov

The U.S. Department of Commerce Office of Inspector General (DOC OIG) is one of the Inspector General offices created by the Inspector General Act of 1978. The Inspector General for the Department of Commerce is charged with investigating and auditing department programs to combat waste, fraud, and abuse.

== History of Inspectors General ==
Inspector General	Date Started
Duane Townsend (Acting)	July 7, 2025
Rodrick Anderson(Acting)	January 24, 2025
Jill Baisinger (Acting)	May 31, 2024
Roderick Anderson (Acting)	January 5, 2024
Peggy E. Gustafson	January 9, 2017
C. Morgan Kim (Acting)	June 4, 2015
Todd Zinser	December 26, 2007
Elizabeth Barlow (Acting)	June 7, 2007
Johnnie E. Frazier	July 20, 1999
Johnnie E. Frazier (Acting)	January 7, 1998
Francis (Frank) D. DeGeorge	April 18, 1988
Francis (Frank) D. DeGeorge (Acting)	April 21, 1987
Sherman M. Funk	October 2, 1981
Frederic A. Heim Jr. (Acting)	January 21, 1981
Mary Bass	July 9, 1979
Guy W. Chamberlin Jr. (Acting)	October 1978
