= Marine Mammal Laboratory =

The Marine Mammal Laboratory, formerly the National Marine Mammal Laboratory (NMML), is a United States research facility that conducts research on marine mammals under the direction of the National Marine Fisheries Service and the National Oceanic and Atmospheric Administration.

The laboratory is based in Seattle, Washington, with research focused on the coastal waters of Alaska, Washington, Oregon, and California. It is organized into programs targeting Alaska ecosystems, polar ecosystems, cetacean assessment and ecology, and the California Current ecosystem. Research tasks include assessing stock quality and quantity, particularly trends in stock sizes. Research methods include satellite telemetry analysis and fieldwork from aircraft and ships.
