= USNS Adventurous =

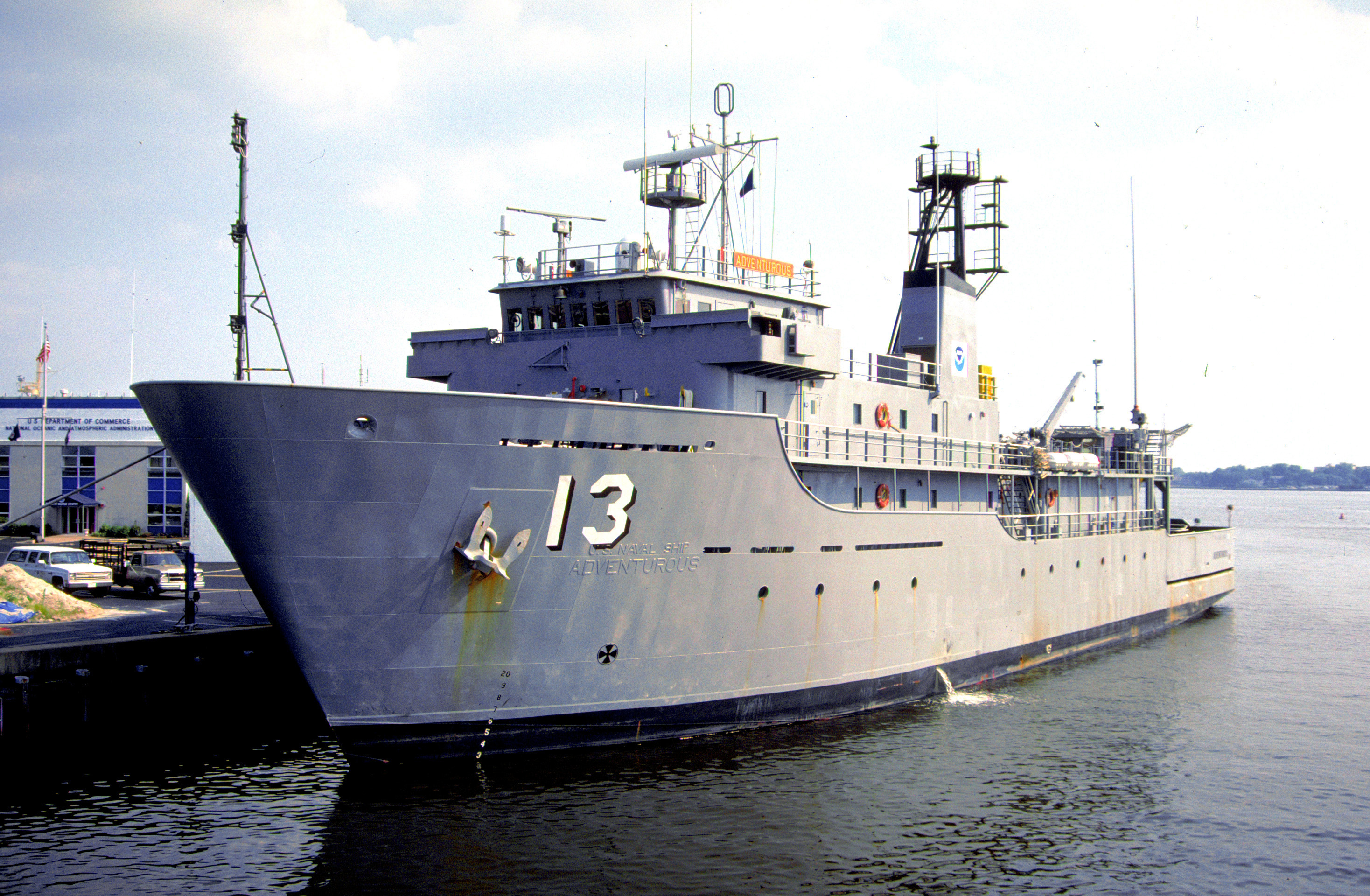
- Ex-USNS Adventurous (T-AGOS-13) at Norfolk, Virginia, on July 11, 1992, after her transfer to the National Oceanic and Atmospheric Administration (NOAA) but prior to her commissioning as the NOAA fisheries research ship NOAAS Oscar Elton Sette (R 335). She already displays the NOAA paint scheme and logo on her stack, but her hull still is painted Navy gray and still displays her Navy hull number.

History

United States
- Name: USNS Adventurous (T-AGOS-13)
- Namesake: Adventurous: Inclined toward bold undertakings
- Operator: Military Sealift Command
- Ordered: May 4, 1985
- Builder: VT Halter Marine, Inc., Moss Point, Mississippi
- Laid down: December 19, 1985
- Launched: September 23, 1987
- In service: August 19, 1988
- Out of service: June 5, 1992
- Stricken: June 5, 1992
- Fate: Transferred to National Oceanic and Atmospheric Administration June 5, 1992

United States
- Name: NOAAS Oscar Elton Sette (R 335)
- Namesake: Oscar Elton Sette (1900-1972), American fisheries scientist
- Acquired: June 5, 1992
- Commissioned: January 23, 2003
- Home port: Honolulu, Hawaii
- Identification: IMO number: 8835097; MMSI number: 303999000; Call letters: WTEE
- Status: Active

General characteristics (as U.S. Navy ocean surveillance ship)
- Class & type: Stalwart-class ocean surveillance ship
- Displacement: 1,565 tons (light) 2,535 tons (full)
- Length: 224 ft (68 m)
- Beam: 43 ft (13 m)
- Draft: 15 ft (4.6 m)
- Propulsion: Diesel-electric, two shafts, 1,600 hp (1,193 kW)
- Speed: 11 knots (20 km/h; 13 mph)
- Complement: 33 (15 U.S. Navy personnel, 18 merchant mariners)

General characteristics (as NOAA fisheries research ship)
- Class & type: ex-Stalwart-class fisheries research ship
- Tonnage: 1,486 GT; 786 deadweight tons
- Displacement: 1,652 tons light; 2,301 tons full load
- Draft: 19.6 ft (6.0 m) (maximum)
- Depth: 22 ft (6.7 m)
- Propulsion: Diesel-electric, 904 tons fuel
- Speed: 11.0 knots (20 km/h) (emergency); 10 knots (19 km/h) (cruising)
- Range: 17,487 nautical miles (32,386 km)
- Endurance: 60 days
- Boats & landing craft carried: 1 × 22 ft (6.7 m) rescue boat; 2 × 17 ft (5.2 m) RHIBs; 3 × 18 ft (5.5 m) inflatable boats
- Complement: 22 (5 NOAA Corps officers, 3 licensed engineers, and 14 other crew members), plus up to 20 scientists

USNS Adventurous (T-AGOS-13) was a Stalwart-class modified tactical auxiliary general ocean surveillance ship of the United States Navy in service from 1988 to 1992. She was in non-commissioned service in the Military Sealift Command from 1988 to 1992, operating during the final years of the Cold War. She was transferred to the National Oceanic and Atmospheric Administration (NOAA) in 1992 and in 2003 was commissioned into service with NOAA as the fisheries research ship NOAAS Oscar Elton Sette (R 335).

== Construction ==
The U.S. Navy awarded the contract to build Adventurous to VT Halter Marine, Inc., on April 5, 1985. She was laid down on at VT Halter Marine's shipyard at Moss Point, Mississippi, on December 19, 1985, and launched on September 23, 1987. VT Halter Marine delivered her to the Navy on August 19, 1988.

== U.S. Navy service ==
The U.S. Navy placed the ship in non-commissioned service with the Military Sealift Command upon delivery as USNS Adventurous (T-AGOS-13). Designed to collect underwater acoustical data in support of anti-submarine warfare operations, Adventurous spent the final years of the Cold War towing sonar equipment to hunt for Soviet Navy submarines. She operated with a mixed crew of Navy personnel and civilian merchant mariners.

The Cold War ended with the collapse of the Soviet Union in late December 1991. The Navy withdrew Adventurous from service on June 5, 1992, and struck her from the Naval Vessel Register the same day.

== National Oceanic and Atmospheric Administration service ==
=== Acquisition and conversion ===
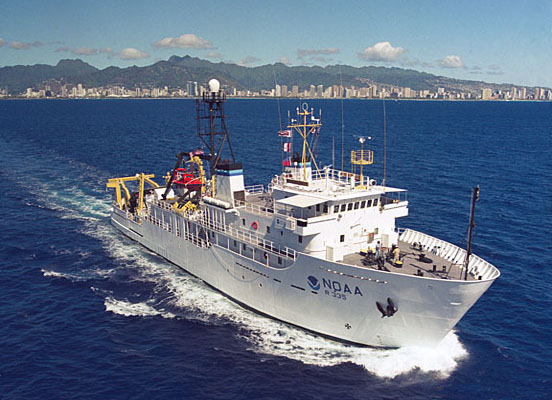
NOAAS Oscar Elton Sette (R 335) underway off Honolulu, Hawaii, sometime between 2003 and 2009.

On the same day the Navy took her out of service, the ship was transferred to the National Oceanic and Atmospheric Administration (NOAA). NOAA originally intended to assign the ship the hull number R 331 and to convert her for use as a survey ship, but after a stint as a platform for basic training in 1993 she was laid up without having undergone any modifications. She remained inactive until October 2001, when she arrived at Jacksonville, Florida, to undergo conversion at the Atlantic Dry Dock Corporation for use as a fisheries research ship. Her conversion was completed in October 2002, and she proceeded to Honolulu, Hawaii, where she was commissioned on January 23, 2003, as NOAAS Oscar Elton Sette (R 335). She replaced the decommissioned fisheries research ship NOAAS Townsend Cromwell (R 443).

=== Characteristics and capabilities ===
Oscar Elton Sette has an oceanographic winch with a maximum pull weight of 15,380 pounds (6,980 kg) which can deploy up to 8,000 meters (26,000 feet) of 3/8-inch (9.5-mm) conductor cable. She also has a CTD winch with a maximum pull weight of 14,700 pounds (6,700 kg) which can deploy 2,000 meters (6,600 feet) of 3/8-inch (9.5-mm) conductor cable, and two hydraulic trawl winches, each with a maximum pull weight of 57,300 pounds (26,000 kg) and capable of deploying 5,000 meters (16,000 feet) of 5/8-inch (15.9-mm) steel wire. She has an articulating crane with a maximum lifting capacity of 24,000 pounds (11,000 kg) and a lifting capacity of 6,600 pounds (3,000 kg) at full extension. She has a movable A-frame with a maximum safe working load of 10,000 pounds (4,500 kg) and two movable J-frames each with a maximum safe working load of 3,500 pounds (1,600 kg).

Oscar Elton Sette has a 150-square-foot (sq. ft.) (13.9-square-meter) (m^{2}) wet laboratory, a 100-sq.-ft. (9.3-m^{2}) dry laboratory, a 100-sq.-ft. (9.3-m^{2}) electronics and computer laboratory, and a 50-sq.-ft. (4.6-m^{2}) hydrographic laboratory. She also has a 50-sq.-ft. (4.6-m^{2}) scientific freezer and a 50-sq.-ft. (4.6-m^{2}) store room.

Oscar Elton Sette carries a 22-foot (6.7-meter) SOLAS-approved rescue boat with a 315-horsepower (235-kilowatt) motor and a capacity of six people, two 17-foot rigid-hulled inflatable boats (RHIBs), each with a 115-horsepower (86-kilowatt) motor and a capacity of seven people, and three 18-foot inflatable boats, each with a 50-horsepower (37-kilowatt) motor and a capacity of 11 people.

To enhance the safety of underwater diving operations in remote areas, Oscar Elton Sette has a recompression chamber to allow immediate treatment of divers showing symptoms of decompression sickness ("the bends").

In addition to her crew of 22, Oscar Elton Sette can accommodate up to 20 scientists.

=== Service history ===
From her home port of Honolulu, Oscar Elton Sette operates throughout the central and western Pacific Ocean in support of the Pacific Islands Fisheries Science Center, also located in Honolulu and a component of NOAA's National Marine Fisheries Service (NMFS). She conducts fisheries assessment surveys, physical and chemical oceanography, marine mammal projects, and coral reef research, collecting fish and crustaceans using bottom trawls, longlines, and fish traps. She uses plankton nets and surface and mid-water laval nets to collect plankton, fish larvae, and eggs. She also routinely supports underwater diving operations.

Oscar Elton Sette also is actively involved in NMFS Honolulu Coral Reef Restoration cruises, which concentrate scientific efforts on removing discarded marine debris and commercial fishing gear from fragile coral reefs, as well as on classifying and analyzing the density of the debris and discarded gear.
