= NOAAS Miller Freeman =

American research vessel

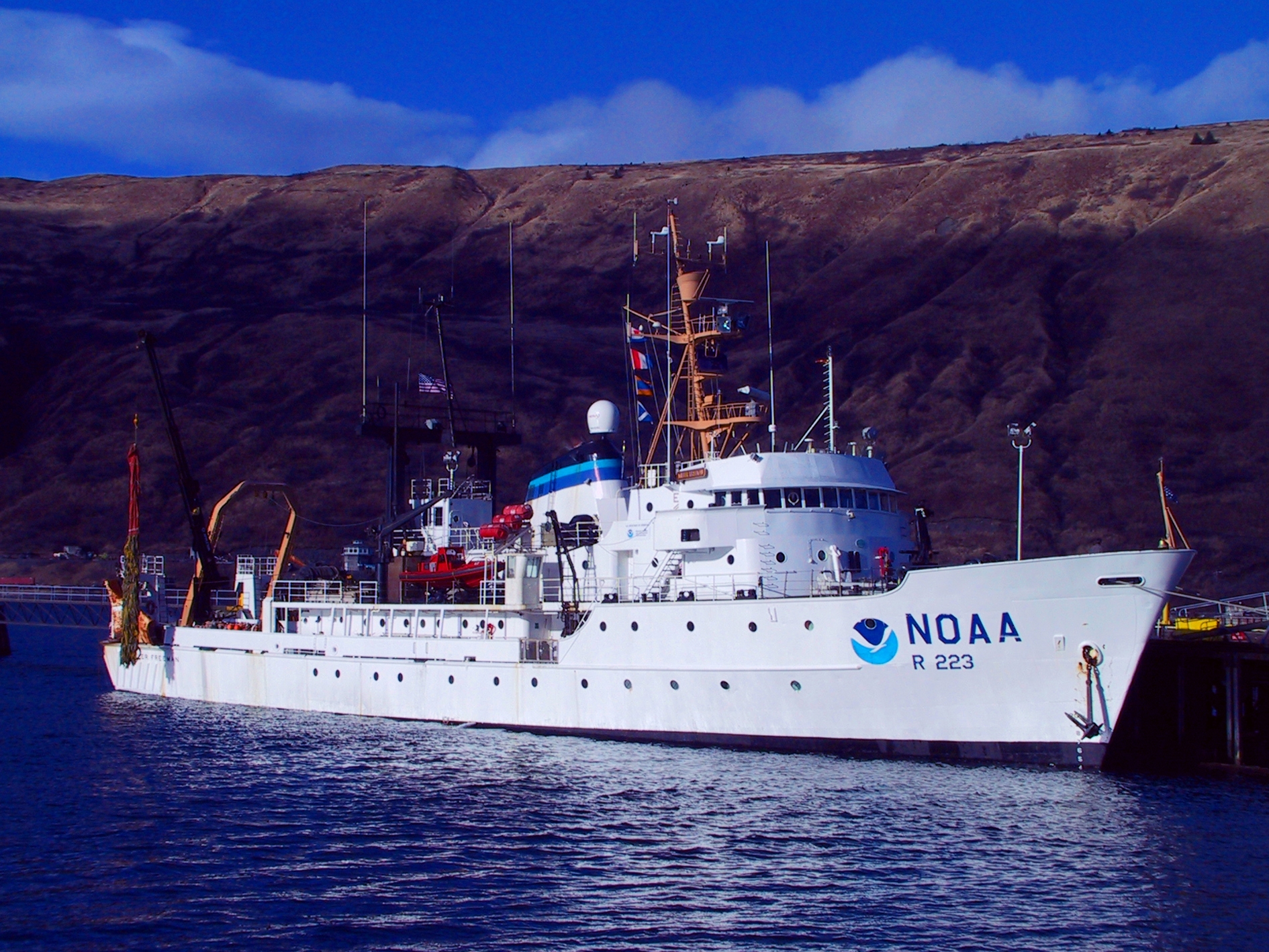
- NOAAS Miller Freeman (R 223) preparing to conduct an acoustic trawl at Kodiak, Alaska, in 2000.

History

Bureau of Commercial Fisheries
- Name: US FWS Miller Freeman
- Namesake: Miller Freeman (1875-1955), American publisher and advocate for American fisheries and the use of scientific fact in managing fisheries
- Builder: American Shipbuilding Company, Lorain, Ohio
- Cost: 3,400,000 (USD)
- Launched: 2 April 1966
- Acquired: June 1967 (delivery)
- Commissioned: 1967
- Decommissioned: 1 July 1970
- Home port: Seattle, Washington
- Identification: Call sign WTDM
- Fate: Transferred to National Oceanic and Atmospheric Administration 3 October 1970

United States
- Name: NOAAS Miller Freeman (R 223)
- Namesake: Previous name retained
- Acquired: Transferred from Bureau of Commercial Fisheries 3 October 1970
- Recommissioned: 1975
- Out of service: October 2010
- Decommissioned: 29 March 2013
- Home port: Newport, Oregon
- Identification: IMO number: 6621636; MMSI number: 303941000; Call sign: WTDM
- Fate: Sold 5 December 2013

General characteristics
- Type: Fisheries and oceanographic research ship
- Tonnage: 1,515 gross tons; 680 net tons
- Displacement: 1,920 tons
- Length: 215 ft (66 m)
- Beam: 42 ft (13 m)
- Draft: 20 ft (6.1 m) (maximum with centerboard up); 32 ft (9.8 m) (maximum with centerboard down)
- Propulsion: One General Motors 2,200-hp (1.64-mW) geared diesel engine, one four-bladed controllable-pitch propeller, one 400-hp (298-kW) Schottle lowerable omnidirectional bow thruster
- Speed: 11 knots (20 km/h) (cruising)
- Range: 12,582 nautical miles (23,302 km)
- Endurance: 31 days
- Boats & landing craft carried: One 26 ft (7.9 m) launch; One rigid-hulled inflatable boat
- Complement: 34 (7 NOAA Corps officers, 4 licensed engineers, and 23 other crew members), plus up to 11 scientists

NOAAS Miller Freeman (R 223) was an American fisheries and oceanographic research vessel that was in commission in the National Oceanic and Atmospheric Administration (NOAA) fleet from 1975 to 2013. Prior to her NOAA career, she was in commission in the United States Fish and Wildlife Service's Bureau of Commercial Fisheries from 1967 to 1970 as US FWS Miller Freeman.

== Construction and commissioning ==
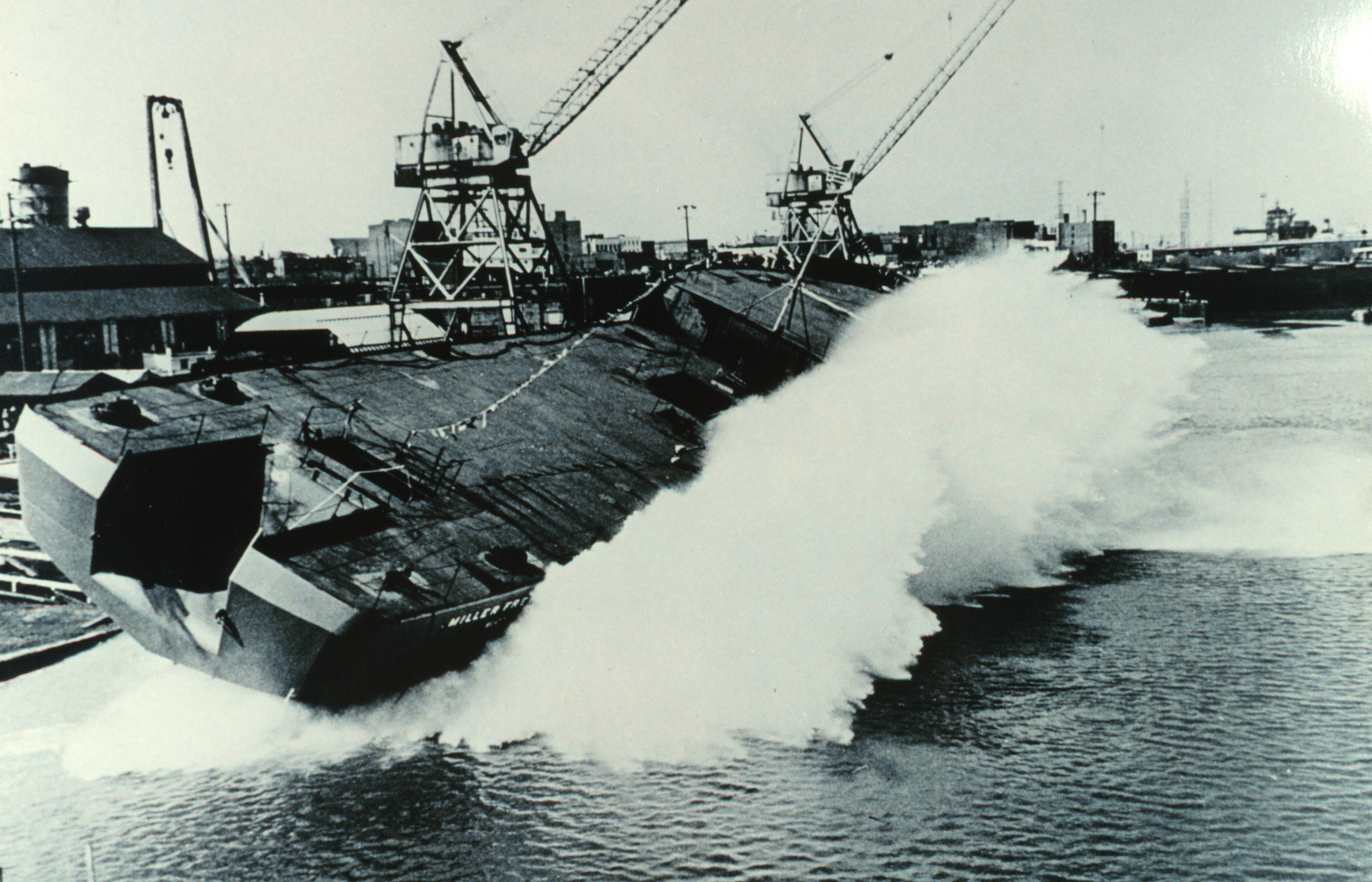
The American Shipbuilding Company launches Miller Freeman at Lorain, Ohio, on 2 April 1966.

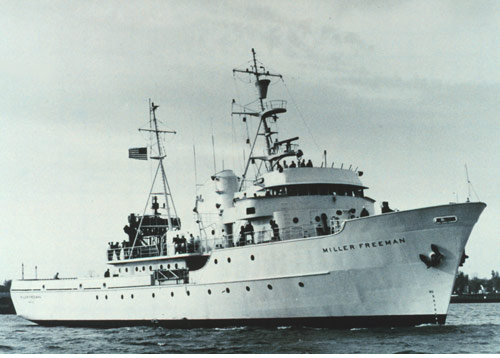
Miller Freeman in Lake Erie off Ohio just after her completion in 1967.

Miller Freeman was designed in 1965 to meet the Bureau of Commercial Fisheries' need for a large vessel for oceanographic research and the open-ocean investigation of fisheries. She was built for the U.S. Fish and Wildlife Service by the American Shipbuilding Company in Toledo, Ohio. She was launched on 2 April 1966 and delivered in June 1967, and she was commissioned into service into the Fish and Wildlife Service's Bureau of Commercial Fisheries as US FWS Miller Freeman.

== Characteristics and capabilities ==
When completed in 1967, Miller Freeman was the largest research ship in the history of the Bureau of Commercial Fisheries and its ancestor organizations, and she remained one of the largest research trawlers in the United States throughout her career. Her stern-ramp configuration allowed her to conduct trawling operations in deep-sea waters.

Miller Freeman had two cranes with a maximum lifting capacity of 8,500 pounds (3,856 kg) and a third crane with a lifting capacity of 2,750 pounds (1,250 kg). She had three A-frames; one of them is a 29.5-foot (9.0-meter) trawl gantry and the other two are 14.5-foot (4.4-meter) Oceo A-frames. She also had twelve winches, one with a maximum safe working load of 40,000 pounds (18,000 kg), one with a maximum safe working load of 23,000 pounds (10,000 kg), two with maximum safe working loads of 22,000 pounds (10,000 kg), two with maximum safe working loads of 18,000 pounds (8,200 kg), one with a maximum safe working load of 3,550 pounds (1,610 kg), two with maximum safe working loads of 3,300 pounds (1,500 kg), and two with maximum safe working loads of 1,150 pounds (520 kg).

Miller Freeman had various laboratory capabilities, including s 300-square-foot (sq.-ft.) (27.9-square-meter) (m²) wet laboratory, a 300-sq.-ft. (27.9-m²) fish-processing laboratory, a 240-sq.-ft. (22.3-m²) rough laboratory, a 170-sq.-ft. (15.8-m²) ocean chemistry laboratory, and a 152-sq.-ft.(14.1-m²) acoustics laboratory. She also had a 220-sq.ft. (20.4-m²) data plot room and a 50-sq.-ft. (4.6-m²) autosalinomater room. She was outfitted with a large live-tank system which allowed scientists to sustain live sea specimens under pressure aboard ship.

Miller Freeman carried three boats: a 26-foot (7.9-meter) Hammerhead Munson Launch with a capacity of nine people, a 185-horsepower (138-kW) motor and a top speed of 21 knots; a five-person rigid-hulled inflatable boat with a 130-horsepower (97-kW) Hamilton jet inboard motor capable of 40 miles per hour (64 km/h); and a 15-foot (4.6-meter) Zodiac inflatable boat with a 25-horsepower (18.6-kW) outboard motor.

In addition to her crew of 34, Miller Freeman could accommodate up to 11 scientists.

Crew: Chief Engineer - Stephen Bus Ret. 2013

== Service history ==
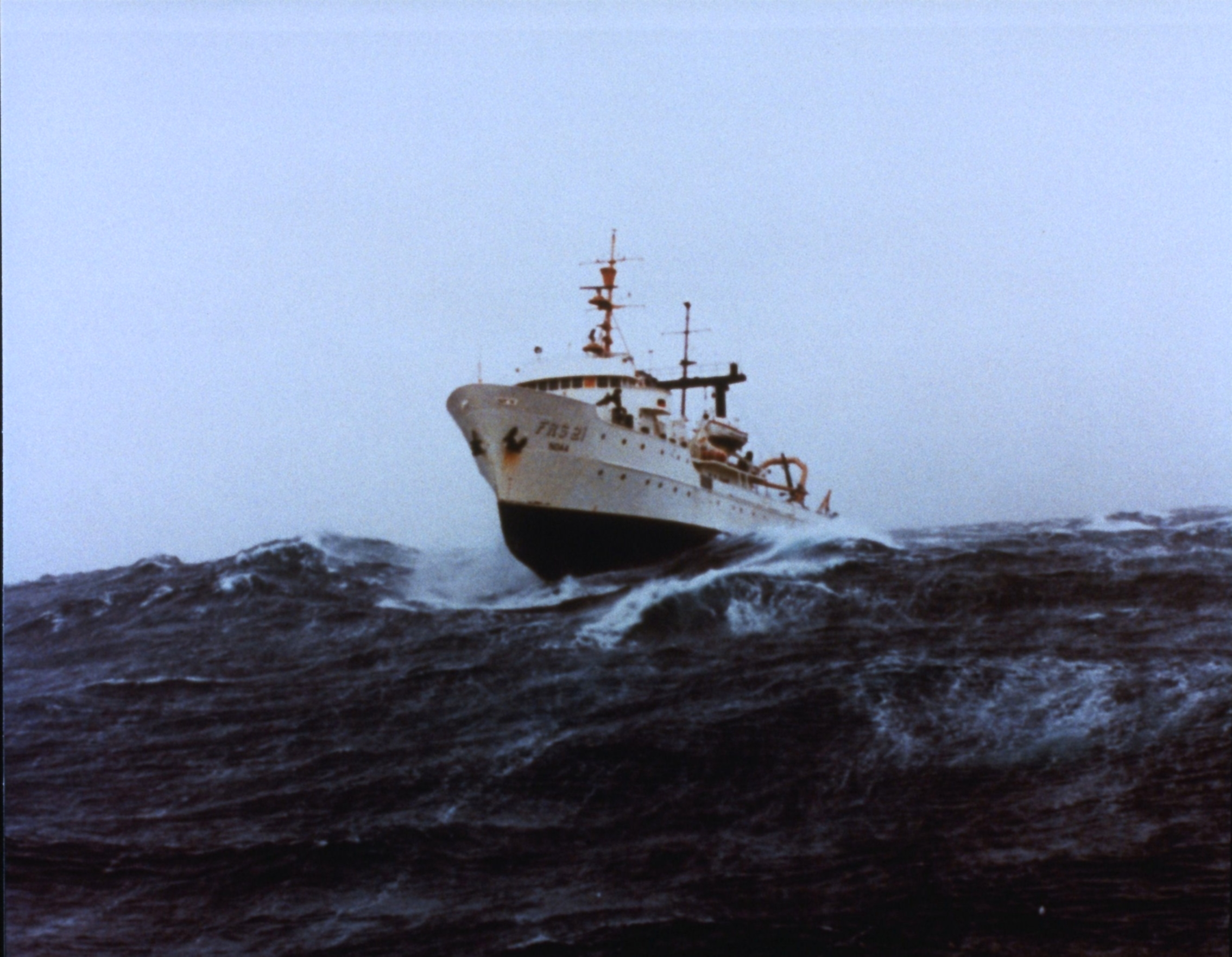
NOAAS Miller Freeman (R 223) approaches a disabled vessel to render assistance during bad weather in the Bering Sea.

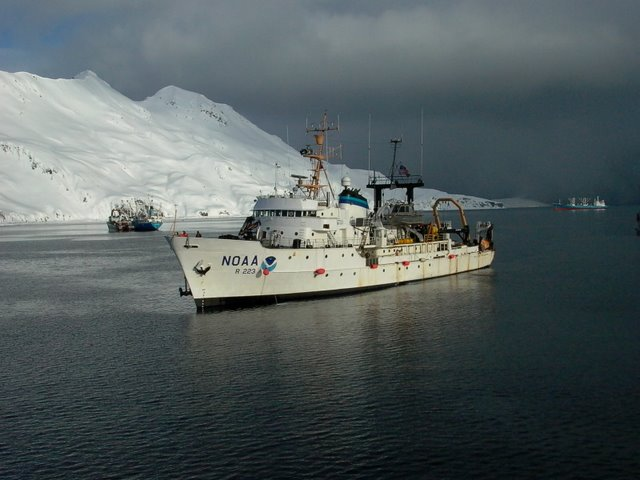
NOAAS Miller Freeman (R 223) in northern waters.

Not yet fully rigged – for example, she had a two-ton (907-kg) crane on her port forecastle but no lifting capability aft – Miller Freeman proceeded after commissioning in 1967 from Ohio through Lake Erie, Lake Ontario, the St. Lawrence Seaway, and the Panama Canal to her home port at Seattle, Washington. However, she did not put to sea again until 1969, when she left Seattle for a cruise in the southern Bering Sea to conduct oceanographic and crab surveys for the Auke Bay Laboratory.

Due to a lack of funding for her operations, Miller Freeman was decommissioned on 1 July 1970. When NOAA was established on 3 October 1970, she became part of NOAA's fleet as NOAAS Miller Freeman (R 223), although she remained inactive. Work began on the completion of her rigging, but it, too, suffered from a lack of funding and was suspended at the end of 1972. Work on her rigging eventually resumed, including the installation of a much-needed five-ton (4,536-kg) crane aft, and when it finally was completed she was recommissioned in 1975. She was re-rigged in 1982.

Operated by NOAA's Office of Marine and Aviation Operations after her recommissioning with her home port at Seattle, Washington, Miller Freeman's primary mission was to provide a working platform for the study of the ocean's living resources, operating primarily in the North Pacific Ocean and Bering Sea. After returning to service, she spent much of the remainder of 1975 conducting work in the Gulf of Alaska and Bering Sea in support of the NOAA Offshore Continental Shelf Survey and Assessment Program, primarily carrying out resource surveys for the Marine Resources Monitoring, Assessment, and Prediction Program (MARMAP). Her research activities were interrupted on 22 October 1975, when the United States Coast Guard asked her to assist the crabbing vessel Aquarian, which had lost her steering while operating in the Aleutian Islands. Despite the rough seas in 40- to 60-knot (74- to 111-km/h) winds, Miller Freeman's crew managed to get a line across to Aquarian and tow her to Akutan Island, ending a two-day ordeal for Aquarian's crew.

In 1976, Miller Freeman discovered mastodon or mammoth tusk, tooth, and jaw fragments during trawl hauls in the Chukchi Sea and Kotzebue Sound. The discovery was of interest to researchers studying the ancient Bering Land Bridge.

In 1988, two of Miller Freeman's crew members – Lieutenant Edward R. Cassano, NOAA Corps, and Daniel W. Granstrom – received the Department of Commerce Silver Medal for their role in fighting a major fire that broke out aboard the ship while she was in port at Seattle. Cassano and Granstrom went below decks to fight the fire without regard for their own safety and over the course of an hour repeatedly led firefighters of the Seattle Fire Department below decks to guide them in extinguishing the blaze, only allowing themselves to be treated for heat exhaustion after the fire was under control.

Miller Freeman became inactive in October 2010 and was decommissioned on 29 March 2013. Awaiting sale for scrapping, she was moored in Lake Washington in Seattle on 6 May 2013 when welding operations started an accidental fire in a storage locker aboard her. The Seattle Fire Department pumped carbon dioxide into the locker to extinguish the fire, and no injuries were reported.

Miller Freeman was sold at auction on 5 December 2013 for 337,550 USD.

== Post-decommissioning ==
As of early 2018, ex-Miller Freeman reportedly was tied up at a commercial tug and towing company's facilities adjacent to the Pattullo Bridge in the Fraser River at New Westminster, British Columbia, Canada. By early January 2019, she had been moved to Maple Ridge, British Columbia, also on the Fraser River, and had been tied up side-by-side with the former NOAA survey ship NOAAS Surveyor (S 132), which NOAA had decommissioned in 1995. Soon after the ship was sailed to Mexico for salvage.

== See also ==
- NOAA ships and aircraft
