= NOAA Corps Meritorious Service Medal =

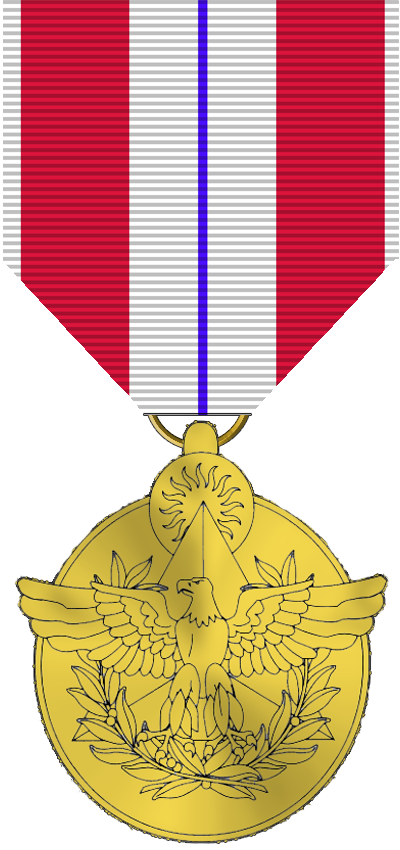
- Obverse of the medal
- Type: Medal (Decoration)
- Awarded for: Outstanding meritorious achievement or service to the United States in a position of considerable responsibility.
- Country: United States
- Presented by: the NOAA Corps
- Eligibility: Members of the NOAA Corps, or a member of the Uniformed Services detailed, assigned, or attached to NOAA.
- Ribbon

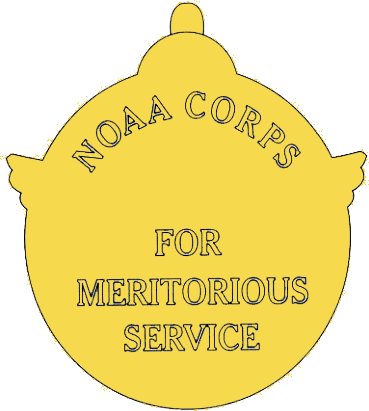
- Reverse
- Established: 23 December 2013

Precedence
- Next (higher): Department of Commerce Bronze Medal
- Next (lower): NOAA Administrator's Award

The NOAA Corps Meritorious Service Medal is the highest honorary award presented by the NOAA Commissioned Officer Corps. Established 23 December 2013, the medal is awarded to those members of the NOAA Corps and those members of the Uniformed Services attached or otherwise assigned to the NOAA Corps. Award of the medal recognizes outstanding meritorious achievement or service to the United States in a position of considerable responsibility.

== Award criteria ==
The NOAA Corps Meritorious Service Medal recognizes acts or service that warrant greater recognition that can be given by the NOAA Corps Commendation Medal, but is less than that required for the award of a Department of Commerce Silver Medal, such as:

- A voluntary act of heroism that stands out as something distinctly above normal expectations.
- Meritorious service, worthy of special recognition, covering an extended period of time. Eligible service should be far superior to that usually expected of an individual of their rank, it should demonstrate significant leadership accomplishments, or is a significant and substantial contribution to the Government.
- Outstanding career service, worthy of special recognition, based on the sustained performance of an officer over multiple assignments. Service should have tangible and sustained achievements in leadership, management and government service.

== Ribbon devices ==
Each additional award of the medal is denoted by a 5/16 inch gold star for the full size medal suspension ribbon and service ribbon and a 1/8 inch gold star for the miniature medal suspension ribbon.

== Notable recipients ==
- Chad M. Cary
- Nancy Hann
- Michael S. Devany
- Michael J. Silah
- Todd C. Stiles
