= NOAA Corps Commendation Medal =

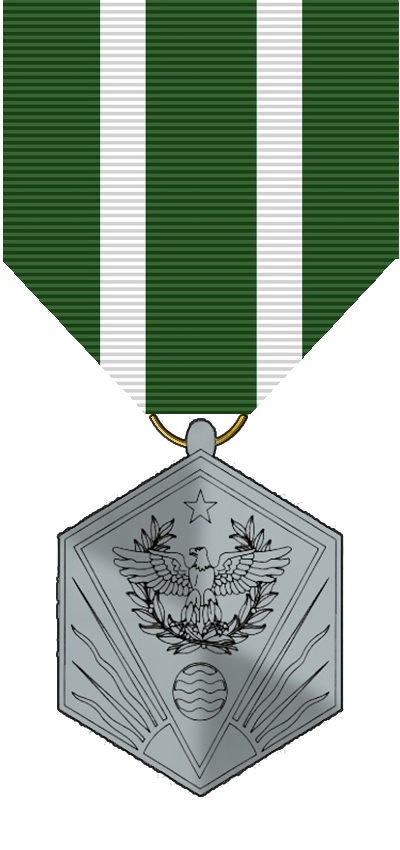
- Type: Honorary award
- Awarded for: Significant contributions to NOAA programs.
- Country: United States
- Presented by: the NOAA Corps
- Eligibility: NOAA Corps personnel or a members the uniformed service detailed, assigned, or attached to NOAA.
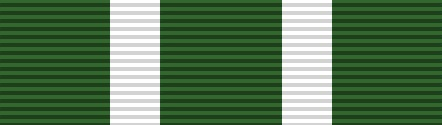
- Ribbon

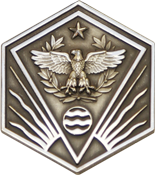
- Obverse

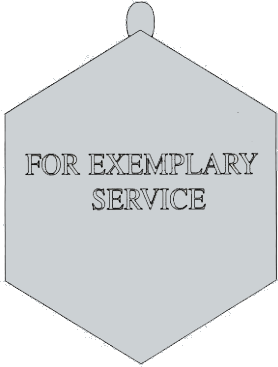
- Reverse

NOAA Corps Order of Wear
- Next (higher): NOAA Administrator's Award
- Next (lower): NOAA Corps Achievement Medal

The NOAA Corps Commendation Medal is an honorary recognition awarded to members of the NOAA Commissioned Officer Corps or to members of the Uniformed Services detailed, assigned, or attached to NOAA.

== Award criteria ==
The NOAA Corps Commendation Medal is awarded for:

- Recognition of acts of heroism worthy of special recognition, but not to the degree required for the Department of Commerce Gold or Silver Medals.
- Outstanding service or achievement worthy of special recognition, but not to the degree required for the Department of Commerce Bronze Medal or NOAA Corps Meritorious Service Medal.
- Leadership meriting special recognition.

== Appearance ==
The medal is hexagonal in shape, 1 3/4 in (44 mm) high and 1 3/8 in (35 mm) wide made of nickel or silver plated red brass. The medal is suspended from a 1 3/8 in (35 mm) wide myrtle green ribbon with two 5/32 in (4.0 mm) white stripes. Subsequent awards are denoted by a gold 5/16 inch star worn on the medal suspension ribbon and service ribbon.
