= Awards and decorations of the United States Department of Commerce =

United States Government awards and decorations

The awards and decorations of the United States Department of Commerce are civil awards and decorations which are presented to civilian and uniformed personnel of the U.S. Department of Commerce, and members of the American public, under the authority of the United States Secretary of Commerce. They include the Commerce Bronze Medal, Commerce Silver Medal, Commerce Gold Medal, President's "E" Award, and the Ron Brown Excellence in Innovation Award.

A further set of awards and decorations are authorized for use in the Department of Commerce's NOAA Commissioned Officer Corps ("NOAA Corps").

== History ==
The U.S. Department of Commerce honor awards program was established in 1949 under the presidency of Harry Truman, with the Gold, Silver, and Bronze medals created that year, and the President's "E" Award, and Ron Brown Excellence in Innovation Award created in later years. Nominations are made by sub-cabinet officers of the department and reviewed by the department's Inspector General. Recommendations for honorees are made by the department's awards board from among nominated persons and entities, and approved by the Secretary of Commerce.

== Awards and decorations ==
=== Bronze Medal ===
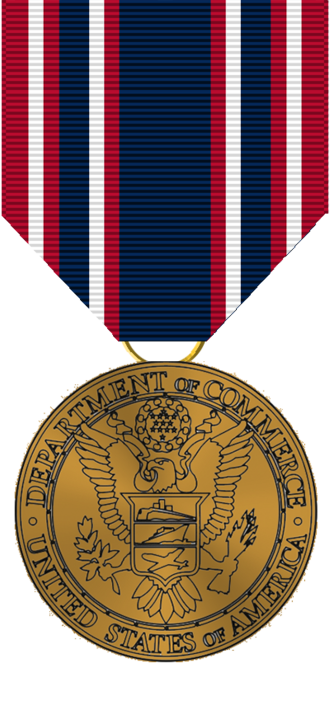

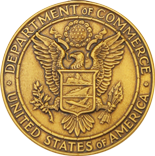
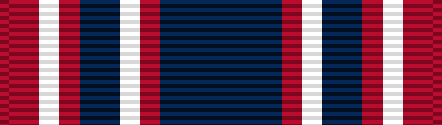

The Bronze Medal is awarded for "superior service characterized by outstanding or significant contributions". It may be presented to an individual, group, or organization. When awarded to officers of the Department of Commerce's NOAA Corps, it takes precedence over the Meritorious Service Medal, but ranks below the Silver Medal.

Notable recipients of the Bronze Medal include Richard R. Behn, Gerd F. Glang, Mary Gibbons Natrella, Harley D. Nygren, David A. Score, and Chad M. Cary.

=== Silver Medal ===
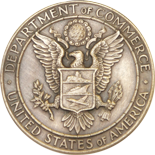
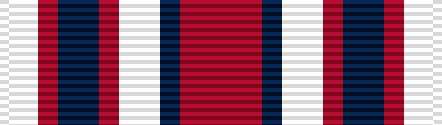

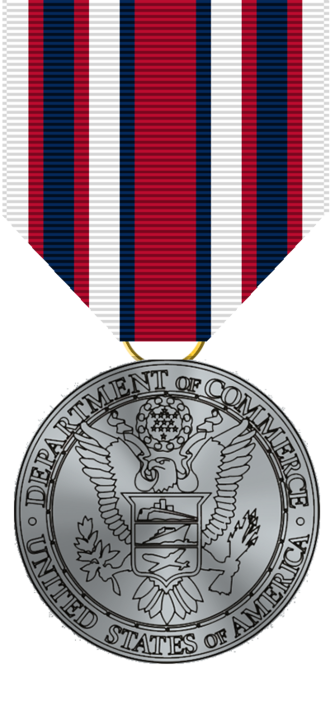

The Silver Medal is awarded for "noteworthy or superlative contributions, which have a direct and lasting impact". It may be presented to an individual, group, or organization. When awarded to officers of the Department of Commerce's NOAA Corps, it takes precedence over the Bronze Medal, but ranks below the Gold Medal.

Notable recipients of the Silver Medal include Adriana Lita, Anita L. Lopez, Michael J. Silah, Nancy Hann, William L. Stubblefield, and Kelly E. Taggart.

=== Gold Medal ===
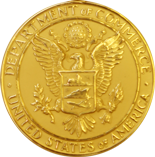
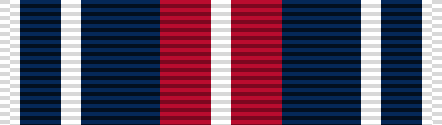

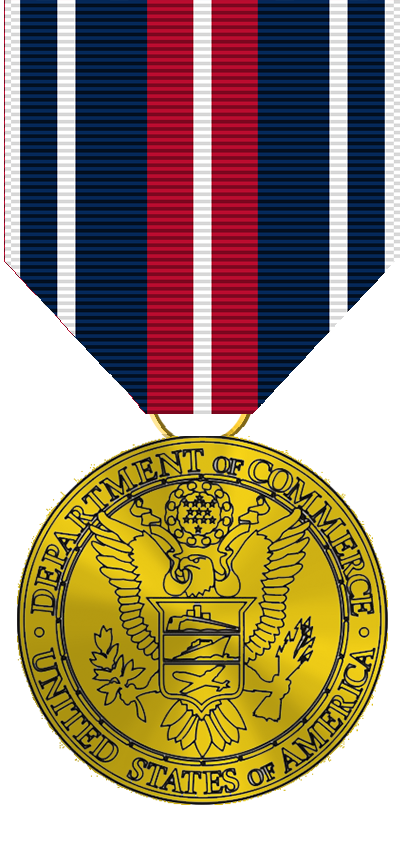

The Gold Medal was established in 1949 and is awarded for "distinguished performance characterized by extraordinary, noble, or prestigious contributions". When awarded to officers of the Department of Commerce's NOAA Corps, it takes precedence over the Silver Medal, but ranks below the Defense Distinguished Service Medal.

Notable recipients of the Gold Medal include Jonathan W. Bailey, Tim Foecke and John L. Hall.

Secretary of Commerce Penny Pritzker decorates physicist Michael Boss with a Commerce Gold Medal in 2016

=== President's "E" Award ===
The President's "E" Award was created on December 5, 1961 by President of the United States John F. Kennedy through Executive Order 10978.

Three types of President's "E" Awards are issued:

- The President’s “E” Award for Exports is "awarded to an exporting firm or organization that has made significant contributions to the increase of U.S. exports";
- The President’s “E” Award for Export Service is "awarded to a firm or organization that may not export directly, but facilitates the exports of others";
- The President’s “E Star” Award for Exports and the President's "E Star" Award for Export Service recognizes "continued superior performance in increasing or promoting exports".

Secretary of Commerce Gina Raimondo presents the President's "E" Award, circa 2022

Recipients of the President's "E" Award receive, and are authorized to fly, a special pennant described in the order as "a flag having a field of white upon which will appear a blue 'E'" and receive a certificate "appropriately executed in the name and by the authority of the President".

=== Ron Brown Excellence in Innovation Award ===
The Ron Brown Excellence in Innovation Award was established in memory of Secretary of Commerce Ron Brown and is annually awarded to one person who "embodies the spirit and standards held up by Ron Brown".

== See also ==
- Awards of the United States Department of State
