= NOAA Corps Achievement Medal =

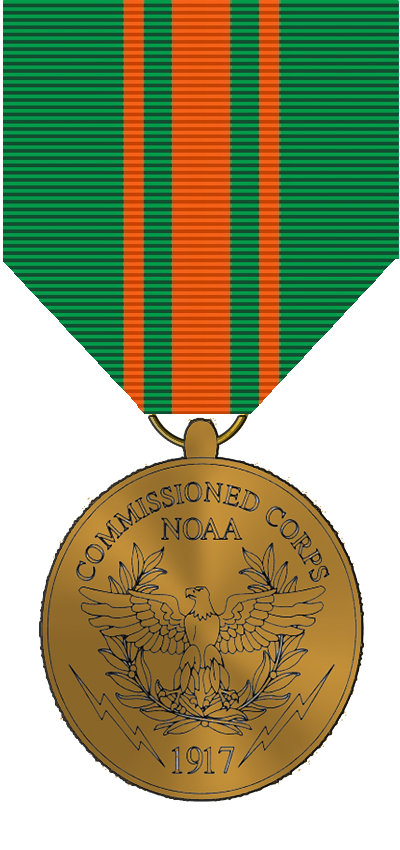
- Obverse of the NOAA Corps Achievement Medal
- Type: Honorary award
- Awarded for: Significant contributions to NOAA programs.
- Country: United States
- Presented by: the NOAA Corps
- Eligibility: NOAA Corps personnel or a members the uniformed service detailed, assigned, or attached to NOAA.
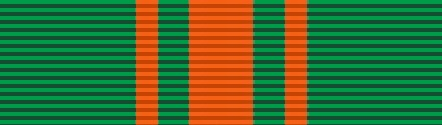
- Ribbon

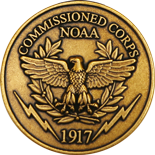
- Obverse

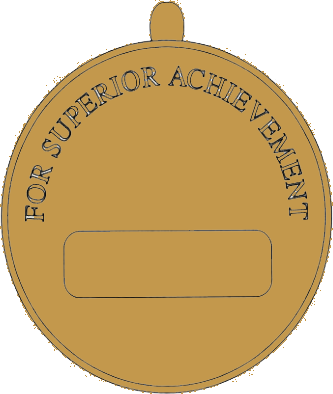
- Reverse

NOAA Corps Order of Wear
- Next (higher): NOAA Corps Commendation Medal
- Next (lower): NOAA Corps Director's Ribbon

The NOAA Corps Achievement Medal is an honorary recognition awarded to members of the NOAA Commissioned Officer Corps or to members of the Uniformed Services detailed, assigned, or attached to NOAA.

== Award criteria ==
The NOAA Corps Achievement Medal is awarded for achievement of a professional or leadership nature based on sustained performance or specific achievement of a superlative nature. The recognized service should be of such merit as to warrant greater recognition than award of the NOAA Corps Director's Ribbon, but less than what would warrant the NOAA Corps Commendation Medal or a higher award.

== Appearance ==
The medal is round, 1 3/8 in (35 mm) wide made of red brass with an oxidized brass finish. The medal is suspended from a 1 3/8 in (35 mm) wide Irish green ribbon with two 1/16 in (1.6 mm) orange stripes flanking a central orange stripe 3/16 in (4.8 mm) wide. Subsequent awards are denoted by a gold 5/16 inch star worn on the medal suspension ribbon and service ribbon.
