= 5/16 inch star =

US military decoration

5/16-inch star
- 5/16-inch star (gold)
- Type: Ribbon device
- Awarded for: denoting a subsequent decoration
- Presented by: United States
- Status: Currently in use
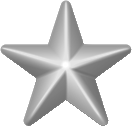
- 5/16-inch star (silver)

A 5/16-inch star (9.7 mm) is a miniature gold or silver five-pointed star that is authorized by the United States Armed Forces as a ribbon device to denote subsequent awards for specific decorations of the Department of the Navy, Coast Guard, Public Health Service (PHS), and National Oceanic and Atmospheric Administration (NOAA). A gold star indicates a second or subsequent decoration, while a silver star is worn in lieu of five gold stars.

A 5/16-inch silver star is not to be confused with representing a Silver Star medal.

== Usage ==
5/16-inch stars are worn on a medal suspension and service ribbon with one point of the star pointing up. Up to five stars can be worn on a ribbon. There are no higher degrees of stars authorized after five silver stars. On miniature medals, a special star is worn on the medal's suspension ribbon in lieu of a star. If the number of authorized stars exceeds five, a second service ribbon is worn after the first service ribbon. The second service ribbon counts as one additional personal award, after which more stars may be added to the second ribbon. If future awards reduce the number of stars worn on the first ribbon due to gold stars being replaced by a silver star, the second service ribbon is removed and the appropriate number of star devices are placed on the first service ribbon. When bronze or gold stars or bronze oak leaf cluster attachments are worn in addition to a silver star or oak leaf, the bronze or gold stars (bronze oak leaf clusters) are arranged symmetrically on the ribbon in relation to the centered silver device. For example: The first star (cluster) to the wearer's right of the centered silver device; the second to the wearer's left, etc.

=== Examples ===
The following are examples of the first through twenty-sixth awards of a Navy and Marine Corps Achievement Medal with the gold and silver 5/16-inch stars:

First award
Second award
Third award
Fourth award
Fifth award
Sixth award
Seventh award
Eighth award
Ninth award
Tenth award
Eleventh award
Twelfth award
Thirteenth award
Fourteenth award
Fifteenth award
Sixteenth award
Seventeenth award
Eighteenth award
Nineteenth award
Twentieth award
Twenty-first award
Twenty-second award
Twenty-third award
Twenty-fourth award
Twenty-fifth award
Twenty-sixth award

== Authorized decorations ==
5/16-inch stars are authorized for wear on the following Navy, Coast Guard, PHS, and NOAA decorations (5/16-inch stars are not authorized for wear on non-decorations when a subsequent decoration is awarded to members of the seven uniformed services: the Army, Navy, Air Force, Marine Corps, Coast Guard, PHS, and NOAA.

The US Army and Air Force use an oak leaf cluster to indicate a subsequent decoration (oak leaf clusters are also authorized for wear on some non-decorations); a bronze oak leaf cluster is equivalent to a gold star and a silver oak leaf cluster is equivalent to a silver star.

Navy and Marine Corps personnel	Coast Guard personnel	Public Health Service personnel	NOAA personnel	Army and Air Force personnel
Navy Cross	Coast Guard Cross			
Navy or Coast Guard Distinguished Service Medal	Navy or Coast Guard Distinguished Service Medal	Navy, Coast Guard, or PHS Distinguished Service Medal	Navy, Coast Guard, or PHS Distinguished Service Medal; Commerce Gold Medal	Navy or Coast Guard Distinguished Service Medal
Silver Star	Silver Star	Silver Star	Silver Star	
			Commerce Silver Medal	
Legion of Merit	Legion of Merit	Legion of Merit	Legion of Merit	
Distinguished Flying Cross	Distinguished Flying Cross	Distinguished Flying Cross	Distinguished Flying Cross	
Navy and Marine Corps Medal and Coast Guard Medal	Navy and Marine Corps Medal and Coast Guard Medal	Navy and Marine Corps Medal and Coast Guard Medal	Navy and Marine Corps Medal and Coast Guard Medal	Navy and Marine Corps Medal and Coast Guard Medal
Bronze Star Medal	Bronze Star Medal	Bronze Star Medal	Bronze Star Medal	
Purple Heart	Purple Heart	Purple Heart	Purple Heart	
			Commerce Bronze Medal	
Navy or Coast Guard Meritorious Service Medal	Navy or Coast Guard Meritorious Service Medal	Navy, Coast Guard, PHS, or NOAA Corps Meritorious Service Medal	Navy, Coast Guard, PHS, or NOAA Corps Meritorious Service Medal	Navy or Coast Guard Meritorious Service Medal
		Surgeon General's Exemplary Service Medal or NOAA Administrator's Award	NOAA Administrator's Award or Surgeon General's Exemplary Service Medal	
		Public Health Service Outstanding Service Medal	Public Health Service Outstanding Service Medal	
Navy and Marine Corps, and Coast Guard Commendation Medal	Navy and Marine Corps, and Coast Guard Commendation Medal	Navy and Marine Corps, Coast Guard, PHS, and NOAA Commendation Medal	Navy and Marine Corps, Coast Guard, PHS, and NOAA Commendation Medal	Navy and Marine Corps, and Coast Guard Commendation Medal
Navy and Marine Corps, and Coast Guard Achievement Medal	Navy and Marine Corps, and Coast Guard Achievement Medal	Navy and Marine Corps, Coast Guard, PHS, and NOAA Achievement Medal	Navy and Marine Corps, Coast Guard, PHS, and NOAA Achievement Medal	Navy and Marine Corps, and Coast Guard Achievement Medal
Combat Action Ribbon	Combat Action Ribbon	Combat Action Ribbon	Combat Action Ribbon	
	Commandant's Letter of Commendation Ribbon	Public Health Service Citation, Commandant's Letter of Commendation Ribbon, and NOAA Director's Ribbon	NOAA Director's Ribbon, Commandant's Letter of Commendation Ribbon, and Public Health Service Citation	

== See also ==
- Awards and decorations of the United States military
- United States military award devices
- Service, battle, or campaign star
