= US FWS Charles H. Gilbert =

American fisheries science research vessel

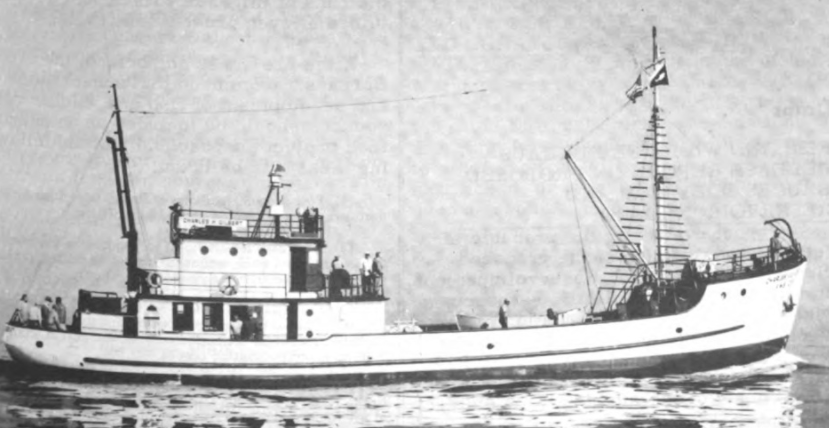
- US FWS Charles H. Gilbert in the 1950s.

U.S. Fish and Wildlife Service
- Name: US FWS Charles H. Gilbert
- Namesake: Charles Henry Gilbert (1859–1928), pioneer American ichthyologist and fishery biologist
- Completed: 1952
- Acquired: April 1952
- Commissioned: 30 April 1952
- Decommissioned: February 1973
- Home port: Pearl Harbor, Hawaii (1952–1958); Honolulu, Hawaii (1958–1970)
- Fate: Transferred to National Oceanic and Atmospheric Administration 3 October 1970

National Oceanic and Atmospheric Administration
- Name: NOAAS Charles H. Gilbert
- Namesake: Previous name retained
- Acquired: 3 October 1970
- Decommissioned: February 1973
- Home port: Honolulu, Hawaii
- Identification: FWS 1003
- Fate: Sold August 1973

United States
- Name: MV Charles H. Gilbert
- Namesake: Previous name retained
- In service: ca. August 1973
- Renamed: MV Jade Alaska 1977
- Home port: San Diego, California (1973–1977); Juneau, Alaska (1977–2007)
- Fate: Sank 20 February 2007

General characteristics (in 1965)
- Type: Fisheries research ship
- Tonnage: 196.5 gross register tons
- Length: 119 ft 9 in (36.5 m) overall
- Propulsion: 650 hp (485 kW) diesel engine, one shaft
- Speed: 10.5 knots (19.4 km/h; 12.1 mph) (maximum); 9 knots (17 km/h; 10 mph) (cruising)
- Range: 8,500 nmi (15,700 km; 9,800 mi)
- Endurance: 80 days
- Crew: 12, plus 4 embarked scientists
- Notes: Information from Progress in 1962–63, Circular 206, U.S. Bureau of Commercial Fisheries Hawaii Area Biological Laboratory, Honolulu, Hawaii, February 1965, and Merchant Vessels of the United States (including Yachts), 1974, 1976, 1977, 1978, and 1981].

General characteristics (as commercial fishing vessel)
- Type: Commercial fish tender
- Tonnage: 170 gross register tons; 115 net tons
- Length: 114.6 ft (34.9 m)
- Beam: 21 ft (6.4 m)
- Depth: 8.4 ft (2.6 m)
- Propulsion: 650 hp (485 kW) diesel engine, one shaft
- Crew: 3
- Notes: Information from Progress in 1962–63, Circular 206, U.S. Bureau of Commercial Fisheries Hawaii Area Biological Laboratory, Honolulu, Hawaii, February 1965, and Merchant Vessels of the United States (including Yachts), 1974, 1976, 1977, 1978, and 1981].

US FWS Charles H. Gilbert (FWS 1003) was an American fisheries science research vessel in commission from 1952 to 1970 in the fleet of the United States Department of the Interior's Fish and Wildlife Service and from 1970 to 1973 in the fleet of the National Oceanic Atmospheric Administration as NOAAS Charles H. Gilbert. She was among the first U.S. fisheries science vessels to explore the central Pacific Ocean in search of commercially valuable populations of fish.

Originally designed for exploratory fishing using longline and live-bait techniques to determine the distribution of tuna in the central Pacific, her role evolved over the years as she underwent modifications to better support the research of fisheries scientists and marine biologists as their understanding of tuna biology increased, and by 1960 she had become a marine research station capable of longlining, trawling, transporting live bait, and gathering oceanographic data. In 1959, she became the only tuna-fishing vessel in the world outfitted with observation chambers incorporating underwater viewports, which gave embarked scientists an unprecedented ability to observe directly the behavior of tuna and bait fish in the water (rather than infer their behavior through statistical analysis ashore) and record the behavior for future study through the use of still photography and film. She also gathered meteorological data and even made gravimetric observations in support of geophysical analysis of the Earth.

During a long and active career, Charles H. Gilbert ranged widely through the central, northern, and eastern Pacific to study the Pacific tuna fishery, transport live bait from other locales to Hawaii so that it could be introduced in Hawaiian waters, and make her oceanographic, meteorological, and geophysical observations. From her home port at Honolulu, Hawaii, her 130 cruises took her southeast to the Marquesas Islands, south to Tahiti, southwest to New Caledonia, well to the northwest and north in the North Pacific, northeast as far as Oregon, and east to the coast of Mexico. In a 1967 summary of her contribution to fisheries science on the occasion of her 100th cruise, the a U.S. Fish and Wildlife official offered the opinion that virtually everything known about the distribution and behavior or tuna at that time was thanks to her operations.

After the conclusion of her United States Government service, the ship became a commercial fishing vessel, initially named MV Charles H. Gilbert and later MV Jade Alaska. She operated commercially until she sank in 2007.

== Construction ==
In August 1947, the United States Congress authorized a new "Pacific Ocean Fishery Program" calling for the "investigation, exploration, and development of the high seas fisheries of the Territories and Island Possessions [of the United States] and intervening areas in the tropical and subtropical Pacific Ocean." The United States Department of the Interior's Fish and Wildlife Service (which in 1956 would become the United States Fish and Wildlife Service) was responsible for carrying out the program, which was to be overseen by a new office, Pacific Ocean Fishery Investigations (POFI), under the direction of Oscar Elton Sette. In addition to the construction of the Pacific Ocean Fisheries Laboratory at the University of Hawaii in Honolulu, Territory of Hawaii, and the development of a Fish and Wildlife Service (FWS) docking and warehouse site at Pearl Harbor, Hawaii, the Congress funded the conversion or construction of three ocean-going vessels to support POFI's work. During 1949 and 1950, these three vessels joined the Fish and Wildlife Service fleet as US FWS Henry O'Malley, US FWS Hugh M. Smith, and US FWS John R. Manning. However, the FWS retired Henry O'Malley in early 1951 due to a need for cost-prohibitive repairs, reducing POFI's fleet to two vessels.

Constructed for use by POFI, Charles H. Gilbert was a 90-or-92-foot (27 or 28 m) (sources give both lengths) steel-hulled research and experimental fishing vessel especially designed for use in investigating tuna fisheries in the mid-Pacific Ocean. She was outfitted for longline fishing, a method Japanese fishermen had used for tuna fishing for centuries and which the FWS hoped to adapt to Western mechanical fishing techniques, in contrast to the Japanese method of longlining by hand. The FWS accepted her at Tacoma, Washington, on 30 April 1952, returning POFI to its authorized strength of three research vessels, and assigned her the hull number FWS 1003.

== Service history ==
=== 1950s ===
==== 1952 ====
Upon acceptance by the FWS, Charles H. Gilbert proceeded immediately to San Diego, California. She departed San Diego on 20 May 1952 for her first FWS cruise, an experimental fishing cruise across the equator between 120 degrees and 130 degrees West longitude to test a hypothesis POFI scientists had developed from the study of oceanographic data that significant tuna stocks existed eastward from the Hawaiian Islands all the way to the coast of Central America. She first proceeded south along 120 degrees West longitude, longlining every 90 nautical miles (170 km; 100 mi) from a point 670 nautical miles (1,240 km; 770 mi) north of the equator to a point 80 nautical miles (150 km; 92 mi) south of it. She then moved to 130 degrees West longitude and fished northward, following the same procedure. She found good fishing north of the equator, catching tuna at twice the rate that commercial fisherman did when longlining around Hawaii, with yellowfin tuna predominating in the southern two-thirds of the zone and bigeye tuna in the northern third, and the FWS assessed that no vessel had ever caught yellowfin and bigeye tuna so far from shore before. Charles H. Gilbert′s exploration resulted in the discovery of a new Eastern Pacific tuna fishery, supporting the POFI hypothesis by demonstrating an abundance of tuna as far as 2,000 nautical miles (3,700 km; 2,300 mi) east of Hawaii and indicating a need for further investigation of areas to the east and west of where she fished. She concluded her cruise with her arrival for the first time at her home port at the POFI docking facility at Pearl Harbor, Hawaii, on 19 June 1952, having made a maiden voyage of 5,000 nautical miles (9,300 km; 5,800 mi) during the cruise.

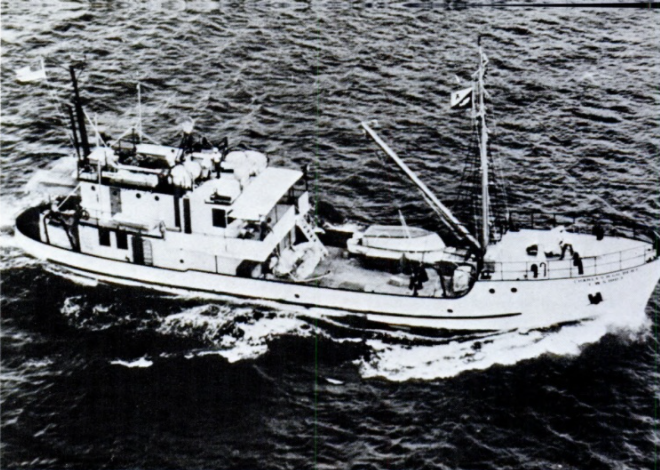
An aerial view of US FWS Charles H. Gilbert at sea.

During her third cruise, which she completed with her return to Pearl Harbor on 14 November 1952, Charles H. Gilbert operated in conjunction with a United States Navy flying boat to study the effectiveness of using aircraft to assist ships in scouting for tuna in the central Hawaiian area. She successfully captured and held bait fish, and electronarcosis tests she conducted on small bonefish, barracudas, puffers, and halfbeaks indicated wide variations between species, fish of different sizes, and individual fish. She battled winds of fresh gale force, and this unfavorable weather combined with an apparent seasonal scarcity of fish and limitations of her design prevented her from carrying out many of her cruise objectives. but what she did accomplish suggested that aerial scouting might prove feasible under better weather conditions.

Charles H. Gilbert quickly put back to sea for her fourth cruise, and on 19 November 1952 she collected seawater samples off Waianae, Oahu, Hawaii, from depths of 50 meters (164 ft), 300 meters (984 ft), and 500 meters (1,640 ft), both to test a method of freezing seawater to preserve phosphates for later study ashore and to determine the rate of change of phosphate content over a few hours after collection of a sample. She returned to Pearl Harbor on 30 November 1952.

Charles H. Gilbert again experimented with methods of scouting for tuna around the Hawaiian Islands during her sixth cruise, which lasted from 9 to 19 December 1952. She proceeded due south from Pearl Harbor, then headed due east to the island of Hawaii, and after operating there for five days proceeded along the northern side of the Hawaiian Islands to Kauai and Niihau. She found schools of small skipjack tuna south of Oahu, around the island of Hawaii, off Maui and Molokai, and near Niihau, and she caught fish south of Oahu and off Niihau. She again cooperated with aircraft, which operated from Naval Air Station Barbers Point on Oahu and made scouting flights on 12 and 19 December along Charles H. Gilbert′s course and north to 23 degrees 40 minutes North. Charles H. Gilbert and the aircraft had equal success in sighting schools of tuna in the same area. Difficulty in capturing bait fish interfered with her fishing efforts, but she did catch 134 skipjack and saved some of them for further study of their diets, breeding population, and growth patterns, and she made morphometric analyses of some of them. She also harpooned a porpoise and collected its carcass for study. In addition, she made seabird observations, noting a relative absence of shearwaters and the presence of jaegers and other skuas – never recorded in the mid-Pacific prior to 1952 – which suggested irregular meteorological and hydrographic patterns. She made 83 bathythermograph casts, operated her fish finder continuously to detect deep-swimming creatures, and noted a temperature inversion in Hilo Bay which FWS scientists thought could explain a lack of vitality in the nehu bait fish population over the preceding month.

==== 1953 ====
Charles H. Gilbert again scouted the Hawaiian Islands area for tuna during her seventh cruise. which she completed on 14 February 1953 after 19 days at sea. It was her third such cruise, conducted as part of an FWS effort to investigate the seasonal distribution of tuna off Hawaii and where they migrated to during the winter in the hope of gathering information that would allow the expansion of the Hawaii commercial tuna industry into unfished areas. She found what the FWS described as a "surprising" number of yellowfin and skipjack west of the islands of Hawaii and Lanai out to 150 nautical miles (280 km; 170 mi) offshore, suggesting a systematic northeasterly movement of tuna into the waters south of the islands. She also carried out preliminary experiments with chemical fish attractants (derived from fish extracts and mixed with fluorescein) in place of live bait; the FWS hoped that the use of such attractants would have wide application off Hawaii and the United States West Coast, although Charles H. Gilbert′s crew noted no reaction by the fish. In addition, she brought back some live, small yellowfin for fish-attractant experiments at the University of Hawaii research station at Coconut Island off Oahu and collected a number of unusual or rare biological specimens, including of the snake mackerel made famous by the 1947 Kon-Tiki expedition. She experimented with the use of a hydrophone and recording equipment to detect tuna, although a hydrophone failure prevented her from trying it in the one area she found skipjack in abundance. An experiment with aeration in live bait tanks using compressed air was more successful, allowing her to keep bait alive in her tanks while hove-to.

Charles H. Gilbert again tested artificial fish attractants during her eighth cruise, attracting skipjack by chumming, then switching to liquid tuna extracts, finding that few fish were attracted to the extracts and the few that were lost interest within 60 seconds. She made two attempts (off Waianae, Oahu, and Port Allen, Kauai, for a combined 210 minutes) to use an underwater camera to test its utility in studying the deep scattering layer, but obtained no important photographs, and an attempt to use a U.S. Navy noise-measuring set to detect sounds made by tuna yielded no detections of tuna-specific sounds. She caught only eight fish in 56 hours 20 minutes of surface trolling, indicating that trolling was not useful for surveying surface schools of tuna, but she did have great success in using an echosounder to detect such schools. She attempted to bring live fish back for study at Coconut Island, but three yellowfin died in her well and the only survivor was a single kawakawa. She returned to Pearl Harbor on 3 March 1953 after seven days at sea.

During her 10th cruise – a four-day voyage that concluded with her return to Pearl Harbor on 26 March 1953 — Charles H. Gilbert tested the difference in handling steel-wire and cotton longline fishing gear off the Kona Coast of the island of Hawaii and southwest of Lanai. finding that coating the cotton gear with Stockholm tar as a preservative made it hard to handle until the tar washed off, suggesting a need for further testing of tar on longlines. She also tested two experimental plastic depth gauges at various depths, finding consistent readings by each gauge when lowered repeatedly to the same depth but wide differences in corrections and calibration between gauges. (Note: Commercial Fisheries Review offers a confusing picture of Charles H. Gilbert′s activities during the spring of 1953. The June 1953 issue (p. 30) credits her with a six-week ninth cruise that ended "at the end of April," implying a mid-March departure date, but the April 1953 issue (p. 10) states that her 10th cruise lasted four days and ended on 26 March 1953, the information in the two issues combined placing her at sea during both her ninth and 10th cruises between 22 and 26 March 1953. The October 1953 issue (p. 41) claims that her 11th cruise concluded on 30 April 1953 – the day that the June 1953 issues claims she returned from her ninth cruise – and lasted 34 days. A 34-day 11th cruise concluding on 30 April would have begun on 27 March, a schedule which would have allowed her to return from her 10th cruise on 26 March 1953 and put back to sea on 27 March 1953 for her 11th cruise. King and Iversen (p. 272) provide a table stating that Charles H. Gilbert′s 11th cruise took place during April 1953. Apparently, the June 1953 issue of Commercial Fisheries Review misidentified her 11th voyage as her ninth, and the October 1953 issue corrected the mistake, and no information was published in Commercial Fisheries Review about her ninth cruise.)

With her 11th cruise, Charles H. Gilbert′s began a series of three cruises to scout for skipjack in the vicinity of the Hawaiian Islands focused on studying changes in the temperature and chemistry of seawater around the islands just prior to and during the beginning of the skipjack fishing season in Hawaiian waters. She conducted a systematic search along a 360-nautical-mile (667 km; 414 mi) track north of Oahu and a 720-nautical-mile (1,333 km; 829 mi) track south of Oahu; cooperated with an airplane based at Naval Air Station Barbers Point in scouting for skipjack and found many skipjack of up to 20 pounds (9.1 kg) in weight both north and south of Oahu, with the greatest concentration of fish 100 nautical miles (185 km; 115 mi) west of the island of Hawaii; and began a hydrographic survey of the Kaiwi Channel between Oahu and Molokai before returning to Pearl Harbor on 30 April 1953 after a 34-day cruise.

Charles H. Gilbert′s second cruise in the series – her 12th FWS cruise – lasted 25 days. She tested chemical tuna attractants – preserved yellowfin tuna flesh extract, preserved skipjack gut extract, and frozen skipjack flesh extract – but reported only inconclusive or negative results. She continued her work in Kaiwi Channel, taking three two-day hydrographic sections there which strongly suggested that warming of Hawaiian waters resulted in a greater abundance of skipjack and fishing farther to the south during the winter would be necessary for the Hawaii skipjack fishing industry to increase its annual take of skipjack. She also tested the Banner plankton trap, improved tagging equipment, and the use of radar to observe bird flocks associated with schools of tuna, achieving good results in all the tests. She returned to Pearl Harbor with 30 live and apparently viable skipjack she had captured, but all died within a day of being placed in a tank at the Coconut Island research station.

During her 13th cruise, which lasted 38 days, Charles H. Gilbert again scouted for skipjack around Hawaii in the third of the three-cruise series. Although she found few skipjack south of Molokai and Lanai, she encountered large concentrations of them in three areas – none of them fished by the Hawaii commercial fishing fleet – namely east and west of a point 50 nautical miles (93 km; 58 mi) northeast of Oahu and in two widely separated areas 100 nautical miles (190 km; 120 mi) and 200 nautical miles (370 km; 230 mi) south of Oahu. She also tested the effect of chemical and visual attractants (including cellophane strips, tinfoil squares, tin strips, and calcium carbide pellets) on skipjack, finding that skipjack ignored tuna extract, were only momentarily attracted to tinfoil squares and tin strips (presumably because of their shiny resemblance to live bait), and exhibited no interest in the calcium carbide pellets, which effervesced as they sank. The fish did feed on dead bait (nehu), following it as it sank, but preferred live bait when presented with a choice. Charles H. Gilbert also executed three weekly hydrographic sections in Kaiwi Channel, continuing the hydrographic survey of the area she had begun in her 11th and 12th cruises. She returned to Pearl Harbor on 12 July 1953 after 38 days at sea.

Charles H. Gilbert departed Pearl Harbor on 16 July 1953 for her 14th cruise, which took her to the waters between Hawaii and the United States West Coast, where she scouted for tuna. She caught little while trolling at an average speed of 9 knots (17 km/h; 10 mph), considerably higher that the optimum trolling speed of 6 to 6.5 knots (11.1 to 12.0 km/h; 6.9 to 7.5 mph), and she made few sightings of schools of tuna thanks to rough seas and frequent overcast which hampered her scouting efforts. She ran her recording thermograph continuously and detected four to six weather fronts passing her during her voyage. She arrived at San Francisco, California, on 26 July 1953, and spent the remainder of 1953 and the early weeks of 1954 undergoing alterations at a California shipyard while US FWS Hugh M. Smith took up her skipjack-scouting duties off Hawaii. Charles H. Gilbert′s alterations included lengthening her by 28 feet (8.5 m) to accommodate greater laboratory space, giving her a length of 118 or 120 feet (36 or 37 m) (sources differ).

==== 1954 ====
With her shipyard work complete, Charles H. Gilbert departed San Francisco in mid-February 1954 for her 15th cruise, a surveying and exploratory fishing voyage. She fished for yellowfin southward, first off Mexico along 120 degrees West longitude and then about 1,200 nautical miles (2,200 km; 1,400 mi) off Central America along 110 degrees West longitude. She made her best catch at 03°44′N 110°00′W – which POFI scientists viewed as proof of the hypothesis that yellowfin occurred continuously along the equator from East Asia to the Americas – and noted the existence of a strong subsurface current near the equator that seemed to be associated with larger amounts of crustacean zooplankton than found farther west, suggesting a need for further investigation of the tuna fishery in those waters. She proceeded to the Marquesas Islands, where she found an abundance of Marquesan sardinella bait fish, then moved on to the Tuamotu Archipelago, where she searched unsuccessfully for live bait at the four largest atolls. After stopping at Tahiti, she longlined northward for yellowfin in equatorial waters along 155 degrees West longitude, finding the fishing poor there but making a good catch of yellowfin and sighting numerous schools of skipjack off Christmas Island at about 157 degrees West longitude. She stopped at Christmas Island to inspect and collect data from an oceanographic and weather station established there in November 1953. During her cruise, she also collected and preserved six specimens of a previously unknown species of pelagic stingray for further study ashore and made careful observations of the difference between five distinct types of spearfishes in the hope of reducing confusion in the naming of marlin species. She returned to her home port at Pearl Harbor – her first visit there since July 1953 – on 26 April 1954, concluding a 67-day, 8,500-nautical-mile (15,700 km; 9,800 mi) cruise.

Charles H. Gilbert departed Pearl Harbor for her 16th cruise on 25 July 1954. She operated in Hawaiian waters, spending 25 days of the cruise scouting for skipjack as part of the FWS's effort to understand the reasons for seasonal abundance of skipjack, especially in areas beyond the range of the existing Hawaii commercial fishing fleet. She identified at least 45 schools of skipjack, finding large numbers of them south of Maui and Oahu and as far as 100 nautical miles (185 km; 115 mi) west of Niihau, as well as about 20 nautical miles (37 km; 23 mi) north of Kalaupapa, Molokai, and her crew determined that skipjack generally were plentiful to the south of the Hawaiian Islands but found no schools of them beyond about 100 nautical miles (185 km; 115 mi) north of the islands. She tagged 156 skipjack, using electrodes to stun the more violently active fish for tagging. She also collected hydrographic information, finding that an eddy west of the island of Hawaii had reversed direction and was flowing clockwise – the opposite of the direction of flow normally encountered in the area – and detecting a counterclockwise eddy southwest of Oahu, with schools of skipjack between the two eddies; she found no eddies west of Kauai. She also experimented to determine the cause of "honeycombing," a commercially undesirable condition in which cooked tuna meat takes on a honeycomb appearance, finding that freezing and icing of fish both were effective at reducing it, while most meat from fish stored in seawater exhibited honeycombing, demonstrating that honeycombing was a result of improper refrigeration. She returned to port on 26 August 1954.

During her 17th cruise, Charles H. Gilbert surveyed North Pacific waters and searched them for albacore. Although rough weather forced her crew to scrap plans to visit 25 of her planned hydrographic stations, she did visit 40 stations, where she collected information on the physical and chemical characteristics of the water in the subtropical convergence north and west of the Hawaiian Islands and conducted zooplankton hauls. She caught 48 albacore by surface trolling while crossing the area of temperature discontinuity, 25 of them in a single hour in the vicinity of 42°N 172°E. Her plans to gather bottom profiles were foiled when her depth recorder broke down after only 10 days of operation. She made synoptic weather observations, but radio conditions prevented her from transmitting some of the observations. She returned to Pearl Harbor on 7 November 1954 after 50 days at sea.

Charles H. Gilbert made her 18th cruise in conjunction with US FWS John R. Manning, the two vessels making a joint exploration and survey of the North Pacific to gather information on the distribution of albacore and its relation to the temperature and chemical properties of seawater in the North Pacific. While John R. Manning focused on surveying for albacore by longlining and trolling, Charles H. Gilbert trolled and gathered hydrographic data and information on plankton and nutrient chemicals. The vessels operated in waters along and to the east of 160 degrees west longitude, as far as 1,000 nautical miles (1,852 km; 1,151 mi) north of Oahu, Kauai, and Nīhoa. The two vessels combined caught six bigeye tuna but no albacore south of 33 degrees North, but they hauled in 21 albacore along and east of 160 degrees West between 34 degrees and 37 degrees North, the albacore ranging in size from 50 to 80 pounds (23 to 36 kg). They also caught a striped marlin, a thresher shark, 31 blue sharks, and 29 lancetfish. Both vessels frequently measured temperatures down to a depth of 900 feet (274 m), and a University of Hawaii scientist aboard Charles H. Gilbert studied the productivity of microscopic plants among the plankton. Charles H. Gilbert noted a virtual absence of albacore near the surface – where smaller albacore had been observed in abundance during a survey of the region in September 1954 – probably due to the onset of winter conditions in the North Pacific. The two vessels had to scrap plans to explore waters any farther than slightly to the east of 160 degrees West due to rough weather, and they returned to Pearl Harbor on 21 December 1954 after a three-week cruise.

==== 1955 ====
Charles H. Gilbert got underway for her 19th cruise on 20 January 1955 bound for the Line Islands, where she searched for skipjack off most of the atolls. She scouted for skipjack for two days south of Oahu, on four days during her voyage south to Johnston Atoll, on five days while en route to Palmyra Atoll, for parts of 10 days off the Line Islands, and then for six days while returning to Pearl Harbor. During a combined 233 hours 12 minutes of scouting, she sighted only 39 schools of fish, of which she identified only nine as of skipjack and five as of yellowfin, and she did not find tuna in commercially exploitable quantities anywhere; POFI deemed skipjack "unusually scarce" in the area she scouted. She experimented with an artificial bait made of tuna extract mixed with agar and glitter, but the fish she encountered showed no interest in it. She caught too few fish to carry out planned tagging experiments, but she did preserve the stomachs of troll-caught skipjack and yellowfin for later behavior studies ashore. She also collected live and frozen specimens of snapper and grouper to support a study of the poisonous properties of food fish and sport fish under consideration for introduction into Hawaiian waters. She conducted a bait reconnaissance at Palmyra Atoll and at Fanning Island, but found only small quantities of mullet. Shore parties from Charles H. Gilbert also serviced and collected data from a weather station on Christmas Island and inspected a weather station on Fanning Island. She returned to Pearl Harbor on 19 February 1955.

Charles H. Gilbert began her 20th cruise on 5 March 1955. The cruise was devoted to a study of the distribution and abundance of deep-swimming and surface yellowfin in various parts of the Central Pacific, the relationship between those at depth and those at the surface, and the hypothesis that migration caused seasonal changes in the abundance of yellowfin. Although few of the bait fish she brought from Hawaii survived the voyage to Palmyra Atoll, she scouted for yellowfin for 146 hours, trolled between 100 yards (91 m) and 3 nautical miles (5.6 km; 3.5 mi) off the coasts of the atolls she visited – finding the best trolling off Palmyra Atoll and the worst off Christmas Island – and occupied 13 longline stations off the Line Islands. Although her rate of longline catches was low, it compared favorably with her trolling results. On six days in which US FWS John R. Manning and Charles H. Gilbert longlined within a few miles of one another, the two vessels had almost identical catch rates, demonstrating that a few miles of separation made little difference in fishing success in the same general area. Charles H. Gilbert tagged 406 of 438 troll-caught yellowfin and 53 out of the 238 she caught while longlining, many of the yellowfin she caught by longline being too badly injured to be tagged and released; she also tagged 11 skipjack and a little tunny. In addition to her yellowfin work, she made bathythermograph casts and took continuous surface water temperature readings, used sounding tubes to determine the depth of longline hooks, occupied night-light stations at Christmas Island and Kingman Reef, serviced the weather station at Christmas Island, prepared yellowfin and bigeye tuna loins for treatment by the Pauley process, preserved tuna stomachs for further study, gathered morphometric data on marlins and uncommon sharks, and brought back live and frozen reef fishes (mostly snappers and groupers) from Kingman Reef and Palmyra Atoll for study. Charles H. Gilbert returned to Pearl Harbor on 21 April 1955 after seven weeks at sea.

From 18 May to 9 or 10 June 1955 (source provides both dates), Charles H. Gilbert conducted her 21st cruise. She tagged 580 skipjack northwest of Hawaii and released 78 of them southwest of Kauai, 27 southwest of Pearl Harbor, 251 off the west coast of Oahu, 17 southwest of Oahu, and 207 off the west coast of Lanai; a commercial fishing boat caught two of the fish — tagged on 1 June and 8 June – off Lanai on 12 July, suggesting little significant movement by the fish at that time of year. Another skipjack she tagged on 25 May 1955 a few miles off Barbers Point, Oahu, from a school averaging 7 pounds (3.2 kg) in weight weighed 14 pounds (6.4 kg) when a commercial fishing bat caught it on 1 February 1956 off Makapuu Point, Oahu, 30 nautical miles (56 km; 35 mi) from where Charles H, Gilbert released it and 252 days after she tagged it, at the time the longest period between release and recapture for any skipjack. Charles H. Gilbert tested electronarcosis on four schools of skipjack as a means of quieting them to avoid injuring them during tagging, but achieved erratic results that suggested the technique lacked efficacy. She collected 80 skipjack in the 5-to-9-pound (2.3 to 4.1 kg) range and 90 in the 25-to-30-pound (11 to 14 kg) range for honeycombing experiments, and brought back two small yellowfin alive for experiments at Coconut Island. She ran her recording thermograph continuously, made bathythermograph casts wherever she caught fish and at other intervals, and broadcast radio reports of fish sightings to the local commercial fishing fleet. She experienced a huge mortality among the nehu in her live bait tanks, puzzling scientists on board, who ruled out oxygen levels as a cause of death and noted that nehu caught in Pearl Harbor were less hardy that those from Maalaea Bay off the south coast of Maui.

Charles H. Gilbert departed on her 22nd cruise on 11 July 1955, during which she spent six weeks tagging skipjack in Hawaiian waters. Her main focus was on skipjack 12 pounds (5.4 kg) or greater in weight because of their seasonal abundance in Hawaiian waters, but they were scarce, and she tagged only 57 of them. She also tagged 764 skipjack in the 3-to-10-pound (1.4 to 4.5 kg) range. On 17 August, she captured 80 skipjacks between 3.5 and 4 pounds (1.6 and 1.8 kg) in weight and processed them for honeycombing experiments. She also tested artificial baits, which were unsuccessful; gathered surface and subsurface water temperature data; and made twice-daily radio reports of fish sightings to the local commercial fishing fleet. Commercial fishing boats captured two of the tagged skipjack, one off Waiale'e near Kahuku, Oahu, on 26 July and one near Lanai on 30 July. A 5-pound (2.3 kg) skipjack she tagged on 22 August was found in the stomach of a 189-pound (86 kg) yellowfin caught on 24 August by a commercial fishing boat off Hilo, Hawaii.

Charles H. Gilbert returned to the North Pacific for her 23rd cruise, a seven-week voyage that began on 15 September 1955. The cruise was part of a series of voyages the FWS planned over the next several years to study the life cycle of the albacore and its relationship to currents and water temperatures with an ultimate goal of determining whether a viable commercial albacore industry could establish itself in the North Pacific. She sighted only one school of albacore (at 45°N 145°W) during the cruise and rough weather limited the time she could spend longlining and gillnetting, but using all three techniques (longling at eight stations and setting gillnets five times) she caught albacore over a broad area approximately 1,200 nautical miles (2,220 km; 1,380 mi) north of the Hawaiian Islands, a sharp contrast to a spring 1955 survey of the area that had shown an almost complete absence of the fish, suggesting that they had since migrated into the area. Longlining caught the largest albacore (averaging 60 pounds (27 kg) in weight), while troll-caught albacore averaged 12 pounds (5.4 kg) and gillnetted ones averaged 7 pounds (3.2 kg). She caught 64 albacore while trolling but only one – a 58-pound (26 kg) fish at 41°04′N 164°29′W — while longlining and 11 (eight of them at 43°22′N 164°40′W) while gillnetting. In addition, she caught five skipjack and three mahi-mahi while trolling; five bigeye tunas, a skipjack, 18 lancetfish, 54 blue sharks, eight mahi-mahi, and a mako shark, while longlining; and 23 blue sharks, two pomfrets, a cuttlefish, and a fur seal by gillnetting. She tagged and released 52 albacore. She also ran her recording thermograph throughout the cruise and made bathythermograph casts that revealed a sharp thermocline at a depth of 100 meters (328 ft) throughout the survey area. She concluded her cruise by reaching Pearl Harbor on 2 November 1955.

During her 24th cruise – from 14 to 30 November 1955 — Charles H. Gilbert again looked for skipjack off Hawaii, and during two days each of scouting in three areas – west and north of Oahu, between Oahu and Lanai, and north of Molokai – she found none. She also occupied 48 stations around Oahu at which she made plankton hails to a depth of 200 metres (656 ft) at even-numbered stations and to just above the thermocline (usually a depth of 200 to 300 feet (61 to 91 m)) at odd-numbered ones.

==== 1956 ====
Charles H. Gilbert′s 25th cruise was devoted to testing the "Sea Scanar," a radar-like long-range sonic fish finder designed to detect schools of fish as far as 2,400 feet (732 m) from the vessel operating it. She got underway on 16 January 1956 and successfully detected a number of small schools of skipjack at ranges of up to 1,200 feet (366 m) before the Sea Scanar broke down on 21 January. She also longlined for yellowfin at 10 stations in the equatorial zone and caught only 23 yellowfin – six of them just south of Jarvis Island — demonstrating a conspicuous lack of yellowfin in the area; she also caught a bigeye tuna, five skipjack, 38 sharks, three black marlin, three wahoo, three lancetfish, and a barracuda while longlining. She only conducted intensive trolling near Jarvis Island, where in 5 1/2 hours of trolling she caught 42 yellowfin, six wahoo, 34 jacks, two rainbow runners, a snapper, and two sharks, almost all of them alongside the reef just offshore. She tagged and released eight longline-caught and 25 troll-caught yellowfin. She also ran her recording thermograph and made bathythermograph casts during the cruise. She returned to Pearl Harbor on 13 February 1956, but put back to sea on 23 February for her 26th cruise and further testing of the Sea Scanar. With the starboard transducer defective, she operated only the port transducer, and found that the Sea Scanar could detect a school of skipjack 14 nautical miles (26 km; 16 mi) off Māili, Oahu, at 600-foot (183 m) scale but not at 2,400-foot (732 m) scale and that the device returned strong echoes while operating along a longline deployed by another vessel. She also tagged and released 95 skipjack, and she returned to Pearl Harbor on 27 February 1956 after four days at sea.

Charles H. Gilbert departed Pearl Harbor for her 27th cruise on 17 March 1956, bound for the North Pacific and another check on springtime albacore abundance and related water conditions there, part of the ongoing several-year effort to establish the seasonal distribution patterns of the fish. She battled rough weather during most of the cruise, including riding out a storm with 70-mile-per-hour (113 km/h) winds. Nonetheless, she carried out experimental fishing with longlines, gillnets, and trolling lines in an area roughly north of Midway Atoll between 165 degrees and 180 degrees West longitude as far north as 42 degrees North. She fished at five longline stations along 180 degrees West between 28 degrees North and 36 degrees North and at two stations along 163 degrees West longitude between 32 degrees North and 34 degrees 30 minutes North; occupied 11 gillnet stations; and conducted 1,598 line-hours of surface trolling. Although she caught albacore via all three fishing methods, they were scarce; she brought in only one by longlining – a 57-pound (26 kg) fish at 36°08′N 179°55′W — and only nine by gillnetting (six of them at 33°45′N 176°57′W) and seven while trolling. She tagged and released six albacore. She also caught 35 blue sharks, a mako shark, nine lancetfish, two swordfish, and two mahi-mahi by longline; two amberjacks, a swordfish, six pomfrets, a flying fish, a pilot fish, 36 blue sharks, two mackerel sharks, four salmon, and 92 cuttlefish by gillnet; and two skipjacks and nine mahi-mahi while trolling. She made plankton hauls throughout the survey area, finding it more plentiful in the western part of the area she fished, where she also captured large squid of 2 to 3 pounds (0.91 to 1.36 kg) in weight. She also occupied 13 night-light stations and observed saury at each of them, but not in great abundance. Four pink salmon she caught, gillnetted in the vicinity of 41°30′N 156°00′W in April 1956, came as a surprise to POFI scientists, and Charles H. Gilbert brought them back for study; the location she caught them in expanded several hundred miles to the south the boundary of the offshore feeding grounds of Pacific salmon in the eastern North Pacific Ocean from what fisheries scientists previously had assumed. She concluded her cruise at Pearl Harbor on 4 May 1956.

Charles H. Gilbert′s 28th cruise was in Hawaiian waters, and she again experimented with use of the "Sea Scanar' sonic fish finder. She detected five schools and 10 suspected schools of skipjack with it at ranges up to 1,200 feet (366 m), raising hopes at POFI that, as operators gained greater experience with it, it would prove valuable in studying the movements and behavior of tuna. She also spent 10 days scouting for skipjack, finding 21 schools and observing their movements and feeding behaviors to determine if the "biting quality" of a skipjack school was related to the nature and quantity of natural food in the stomachs of the fish in the school, resulting in some schools being fished more easily than others. After two weeks at sea, she reached Pearl Harbor on 5 June 1956.

On 11 July 1956, Charles H. Gilbert set out on her 29th cruise. Off Oahu and Molokai on 11 and 12 July, she tested the use of tilapia as bait and its relative utility compared to nehu, finding that tuna fed on sinking tilapia. She then began more experimentation with the "Sea Scanar." After testing the device off Waianae, Oahu, on 13 July, she operated from 15 to 20 July in calm waters off the Kona Coast of the island of Hawaii to determine its maximum detection range against various targets suspended underwater, achieving detections of a stainless steel triplane of three 24-inch (61 cm) circular planes at 2,180 feet (664 m), an aluminum triplane of three 12-inch (30 cm) square planes at 2,080 feet (634 m), a brass triplane of three 3-inch (7.6 cm) square planes at 1,800 feet (549 m), a frozen 20-pound (9.1 kg) skipjack at 1,020 feet (311 m), and a dead 18-centimeter (7.1 in) herring at 1,100 feet (335 m). She also tested the "Sea Scanar" to determine its performance in various sea conditions and to gather information relevant to establishing effective sound search procedures, achieving detections of schools of skipjack and mahi-mahi and herds of porpoise and pilot whales. During her return trip to Pearl Harbor, she scouted for tuna for 66 hours between 20 and 22 July, sighting nine schools of skipjack and one of yellowfin. She reached Pearl Harbor on 22 July 1956. The September 1956 issue of Commercial Fisheries Review said that her "Sea Scanar" results meant that the "whereabouts and movements of skipjack and large tuna (aku [skipjack] and ahi [yellowfin and bigeye tuna]) may soon be an open book to fishery scientists of the U.S. Fish and Wildlife Service."

In her next cruise – her 30th — Charles H. Gilbert along with US FWS Hugh M. Smith took part in EQUAPAC, a multiple-vessel international survey of the equatorial Pacific between 135 degrees West longitude and the Philippines. She focused on an exploration of the tuna fishery of the Marquesas Islands, which the FWS saw as important due to the island group's relative proximity to the home ports of the California commercial fishing fleet. Getting underway from Pearl Harbor on 6 August 1956, she spent 16 days longlining in the open sea east of the Marquesas and four longlining inshore, achieving low catch rates: Her best daily catch was 20 yellowfin, 14 albacore, and seven bigeye tuna, although the bigeyes (all caught between 5 degrees South and 11 degrees South) were unusually large, weighing from 300 to 370 pounds (136 to 168 kg). She called at Taihohe on Nuku Hiva and at Taipi Valley, where she collected bait – mostly Marquesan sardinellas —from seven bays for use as live bait, then scouted for tuna and simulated the fishing methods California commercial fishing boats would use in the area, trolling for tuna near the surface with live Marquesan sardinellas as bait. She sighted 16 schools near the surface. Tuna appeared to be scarce in the area, suggesting their seasonal absence during the Southern Hemisphere′s winter: She caught only one yellowfin while trolling, although she also caught four 40-to-60-pound (18 to 27 kg) dogtooth tuna and took 344 skipjack averaging 5 pounds (2.3 kg) in weight from one school. Overall, she found yellowfin most abundant around the equator at 132 degrees West longitude and albacore in the greatest numbers in Marquesan coastal waters and south of 12 degrees South. Having fished around all 11 islands of the Marquesas, she headed back to Pearl Harbor, which she reached on 26 September 1956. She brought about 2,500 live Marquesan sardinellas back to Hawaii, and they were released in Oahu's Hanauma Bay in the hope of establishing them in Hawaiian waters, where a critical lack of live bait interfered with the performance of the Hawaii skipjack industry.

Charles H. Gilbert′s final cruise of 1956 was her 31st for the FWS, and she made it in conjunction with US FWS John R. Manning to gather information on the seasonal distribution of albacore in the waters between Hawaii and the U.S. West Coast, with Charles H. Gilbert focusing particularly on the waters between 35 degrees North, 141 degrees North, 126 degrees West, and 145 degrees West. John R. Manning departed Pearl Harbor on 17 October 1956, and Charles H. Gilbert followed on 22 October. She occupied 11 gillnet stations, catching only a single, 7-pound (3.2 kg) albacore by this means (at 38°30′N 134°54′W), along with 127 blue sharks, two mako sharks, 181 pomfrets, 33 squid, and part of the head of a spearfish. In 4,356 hours of trolling, she caught 154 albacore (along with two bigeye tuna and 11 mahi-mahi), her best daily catch being 31 albacore in the vicinity of 37°00′N 123°30′W. She also attempted to use tilapia as bait to catch albacore with pole and line, but had no success, although she did find that the mortality rate among tilapia in her bait tank was quite low. She tagged 114 albacore and one bigeye tuna, using an experimental dart on three of the fish, took morphometric measurements of 26 albacore, and collected and preserved albacore stomachs and gonads for study. She operated the "Sea Scanar" in the hope of finding and tracking deep-swimming albacore, but identified only one school by this means, at 37°18′N 127°45′W. She also conducted surface plankton hauls at 10 of her gillnet stations and 24 30-minute oblique plankton hauls down to a depth of 140 meters (459 ft). Charles H. Gilbert and John R. Manning both returned to Pearl Harbor on 11 December 1956. Based on their findings, FWS scientists determined that the seasonal distribution of albacore was determined by an isotherm, a meandering and unstable line where the water temperature was 57 °F (14 °C); a thermocline between colder, deeper water and warmer surface water, which could lie only a few feet below the surface or at depths greater than 200 feet (61 m); and a "food boundary" between the presence and absence of zooplankton, with albacore limited to waters warmer than 57 °F (14 °C) and where zooplankton was present in sufficient amounts. A number of fish Charles H. Gilbert tagged during the cruise were caught later, giving scientists insight into albacore movements: An albacore she tagged on 17 November 1956 at 36°44′N 127°37′W was caught by a Japanese longliner exactly a year later on 17 November 1957 at 38°08′N 174°53′W, the fish having gained 15 pounds (6.8 kg) in the interim, and another albacore she tagged on 14 November 1956 at 38°00′N 128°25′W was caught by an American commercial fishing boat on 23 August 1958 at 32°15′N 122°30′W and had grown at a calculated rate of 11 pounds (5.0 kg) per year. Another albacore tagged on 21 November 1956 at 35°21′N 123°57′W was caught by an American fishing boat on 21 July 1958 at 34°00′N 122°10′W. and a fourth albacore she tagged on 16 November 1956 at 36°48′N 127°33′W was caught 640 days later on 23 August 1958 345 nautical miles (639 km; 397 mi) away at 32°38′N 123°0′W. On 13 March 1960, a Japanese longliner caught an albacore 1,000 nautical miles (1,850 km; 1,150 mi) southeast of Tokyo Bay near Marcus Island, three years and four months after Charles H. Gilbert tagged the fish on 16 November 1956 – a record for the time between the tagging and recapture of an albacore.

While Charles H. Gilbert was at sea on her 31st cruise, the FWS underwent a sweeping reorganization that took effect on 6 November 1956 in which it was renamed the United States Fish and Wildlife Service (USFWS) and was divided into two major new bureaus, the Bureau of Sport Fisheries and Wildlife and the Bureau of Commercial Fisheries (BCF). Seagoing vessels such as Charles H. Gilbert came under the control of the BCF.

==== 1957 ====
Early in 1957, Charles H. Gilbert was further involved in USFWS studies of the potential for both bait fishing and tuna fishing in the vicinity of the Marquesas Islands and the Tuamotu Archipelago via a "task force" approach involving all three POFI vessels. While US FWS John R. Manning longlined for deep-swimming tuna and US FWS Hugh M. Smith conducted an oceanographic cruise to gather data on water conditions in the area, Charles H. Gilbert departed Pearl Harbor to begin her 32nd cruise on 11 January 1957 to conduct a bait reconnaissance of French Oceania and experiment with live-bait fishing in the region. Arriving in the Marquesas on 24 January 1957, she scouted 13 bays there for bait fish and found that the number of bait fish varied greatly from bay to bay, but were abundant overall, in contrast to their previously noted scarcity during the Southern Hemisphere winter. She collected Marquesan sardinellas and goatfish of the genus Mulloidichthys for use as live bait. She made two tuna surveys of the Marquesas (from 25 to 31 January and from 23 February to 1 March). and spent three days in the Tuamotu Archipelago around Ahe, Manihi, and Rangiroa, finding skipjack in abundance but fewer yellowfin. She sighted 263 surface schools of tuna, of which she confirmed 30 as yellowfin and 128 as skipjack. Finding that Marquesan sardinellas schooled near the vessel and made good live bait while the goatfish tended to scatter and dive too quickly to attract tuna, she caught 53 yellowfin and 4,838 skipjack, of which she tagged 10 yellowfin and 797 skipjack with the new POFI plastic dart tag and released them in the hope of unraveling the still-mysterious patterns of tuna migration. She returned to Pearl Harbor on 22 March 1957 after 70 days at sea. That day, POFI scientists released about 12,000 live Marquesan sardinellas she had brought back into Pokai Bay on Oahu in the hope of establishing the species in Hawaii to increase the chronically short supply of bait fish there.

Charles H. Gilbert made her 34th cruise – another skipjack-scouting trip in Hawaiian waters – between 21 June and 21 August 1957 and made a major discovery: A “skipjack hole” or “skipjack concourse” – a place where skipjack occur year-round rather than only seasonally – off Cape Kaea, Lanai. Her discovery prompted POFI to begin an intensive study of the "skipjack concourse" in July 1957. She collected physical, chemical, and biological data about the "concourse," finding a temperature discontinuity of 1 to 1.5 degrees Fahrenheit (0.56 to 0.83 °C) over about 0.25 nautical miles (0.46 km; 0.29 mi) in the area and more plankton in the discontinuity than on either side of it. She tagged and released 2,416 skipjack – 1,624 of them between 3 and 13 July alone while fishing in the "skipjack concourse" – in the hope that their movements would shed light on the still-mysterious migration of skipjack into Hawaiian waters each summer, and 212 of the fish she tagged were caught by commercial fishing boats by November 1957. She also experimented with a POFI-designed steel and plastic observation "bucket," a subsurface observation platform which she could suspend about 8 feet (2.4 m) below her hull near her stern, allowing a scuba-equipped scientist to observe directly the underwater behaviors of fish in her vicinity for the first time. Reporting visibility as great as 180 feet (55 m), scientists in the "bucket" observed the behaviors of bait fish — nehu (Encrasicholina purpurea), Hawaiian silverside (Atherinomorus insularum), and Mozambique tilapia – around the vessel both when she was fishing and when she was not, and at one point estimated 1,000 skipjack and little tunnies around the vessel. Her experiments determined that a scientist could sit in safety in the "bucket" while the vessel made up to 6 knots (11 km/h; 6.9 mph). POFI hoped that this new technique would allow scientists to use their time more efficiently by directly observing the behavior of tuna with regard to bait and artificial lures rather than inferring their behavior indirectly through the use of statistics. She also operated her Sea Scanar against a school of yellowfin, a number of skipjack schools, and several herds of porpoises, sometimes maintaining contact for several hours, but also learning of the device's operational limitations. She occupied an International Geophysical Year oceanographic station at 21°10′18″N 158°18′48″W on 21 June, 21 July, and 20 August, and carried out a monthly 20-station environmental survey off Oahu in June, July, and August, where she made plankton hauls and bathythermograph casts and collected seawater samples for later analysis of their salinity and inorganic phosphate content. She also made weather reports four times daily, noted sightings of fish, and broadcast information on fish sightings to commercial fishing boats.

Charles H. Gilbert′s final cruise of 1957 was her 35th FWS cruise. Departing Pearl Harbor on 2 October 1957 bound for the Marquesas Islands, she made bathythermograph casts, zooplankton and larvae hauls, and Secchi disk and Forel observations and collected salinity and phosphate samples during the voyage from Hawaii to the Marquesas and in the waters of the Marquesas, and she used an echo sounder to study variations in the depth of the deep scattering layer. She made three standard tuna surveys around the Marquesas, finding fewer than half as many surface tuna schools as during a survey made in January–March 1957. During each survey, she retained the first 25 fish she caught to determine size frequency and sex and collected and preserved the stomachs and gonads of five females; during the latter half of the cruise she collected the stomachs of five males. She tagged and released the rest of the tuna she caught during each survey, a total of 1,350 fish, and she took blood samples from skipjacks, yellowfin, little tunnies, and dogtooth tunas for serological tests. She also conducted a live bait reconnaissance, scouting six bays in the Marquesas for Marquesan sardinellas, finding them in two of the bays, and recording the size frequency, sex, and gonad development of 25 of them from each bay. She spent four days scouting and fishing for tuna in the waters of the Tuamotu Archipelago, finding them somewhat more abundant there than in the Marquesas. She returned to Pearl Harbor on 14 December 1957. On the day of her return, she released 31,000 Marquesan sardinellas off Ewa, Oahu; the fourth and largest release since the FWS program began its program of releasing them in January 1955 in the hope of establishing them as bait fish in Hawaiian waters, it brought to 53,000 the number of Marquesan sardinellas released in Hawaii.

==== 1958 ====
Charles H. Gilbert′s next major cruise was her 38th, which began in February 1958. After carrying out an environmental survey at 12 stations off Oahu involving bathythermograph casts and the collection of seawater salinity samples, she headed south and explored the waters of the Marquesas Islands and the Tuamotu Archipelgao and other tropical Pacific areas as far south as Tahiti as the USFWS continued to gather data on the seasonal distribution of tuna in those waters in the hope of establishing a U.S. West Coast–based tuna fishery there. She conducted two standard inshore surveys in the Marquesas, between 27 February and 8 March and between 11 and 19 April, and a 12-day offshore survey from 26 March to 8 April. She also made a two-day scouting and fishing visit to the Tuamotus. Longlining at seven stations along 150 degrees West between 5 degrees North and 1 degree South yielded poor results; she tagged and released a bigeye tuna and seven yellowfin she caught during this phase of the cruise. Sighting 76 schools of skipjack, yellowfin, or both, during the cruise, she found skipjack to be plentiful overall in the areas she scouted, generally around 5 pounds (2.3 kg) in weight around the Marquesas but between 15 and 20 pounds (6.8 and 9.1 kg) farther south in the Tuamotus and Tahitian waters. Until 10 April, she found that Marquesan sardinellas were scarce in many areas FWS scientists had found them previously, but after that date she again found them in significant quantities, and embarked scientists recorded size frequency, weight, and gonad development from 25 of them at each locality in which Charles H. Gilbert caught them. They made good live bait for skipjack, and she brought enough of the sardinellas back to Hawaii to bring to 55,000 the number of Marquesan sardinellas released in Hawaiian waters by the FWS in the hope of establishing them as a bait fishery there. In addition to 83 plankton and larval fish tows – including two 140-meter (459 ft) tows to gather information on the diurnal distribution of zooplankton – she made 336 bathythermograph casts and 14 Secchi disk and Forel observations, and took 233 surface salinity samples, 204 phosphate samples, and blood samples from bigeye tuna and skipjack for serological tests. The 85-day cruise concluded on 2 May 1958.

On 30 May 1958, Charles H. Gilbert put back to sea for her 39th cruise. Experience with her submersible observation platform had demonstrated the utility of observing tuna and bait behavior underwater but also indicated a need for underwater photography and motion pictures, so she embarked on the cruise with a new observation "bucket" outfitted with portholes and designed to be lowered over the side to allow an operator to capture underwater photographs and movies while remaining dry himself. She experimented with filming a 48-by-8-by-0.5-inch (121.9 by 20.3 by 1.3 cm) plyboard divided into 8-by-8-inch (20 by 20 cm) panels colored white, gray, black, blue, and red at distances of 10 to 100 feet (3.0 to 30.5 m) using various types of film and various exposures. Water bubbles created by water turbulence caused the greatest difficulty, and experiments showed that filming worked best when Charles H. Gilbert remained stationary while fishing. She also tested the effects of dead bait, tilapia, water sprays, different rates of chumming, and the sound of metal hammers beating on the hull on skipjack feeding behavior in the "skipjack concourse" off Lanai, finding that skipjack tended to go deeper when presented with dead bait or tilapia, came closer to the surface when water sprays were on, and were unaffected by the sound of the hammers, and that increased chumming caused small schools to fall back but larger schools to become more active. Faulty fitting of both transducers prevented her from employing her Sea Scanar effectively during the cruise. Of the skipjack she caught, she retained 10 percent for samples of length, weight, stomach contents, and gonad development, and she tagged and released 479 skipjack in the "skipjack concourse" off Cape Kaea, Lanai, and another 120 north of Kahului, Maui. She occupied two International Geophysical Year oceanographic stations on 30 May and 21–22 June and various environmental monitoring survey stations off Oahu from 30 May to 1 June and from 20 to 21 June, making bathythermograph casts and collecting salinity samples, and she carried out the same activities as well as plankton tows at various stations off Lanai. She returned to Pearl Harbor on 3 July 1958.

Charles H. Gilbert focused on determining the northern boundary between North Pacific water and the water of the California Current during her 40th cruise, which she conducted around and northwest of the island of Hawaii and northwest of Maui from 14 to 21 July 1958. She found sharp salinity gradients at the boundary and four large schools of skipjack in the lower-salinity water at the boundary. She also found and gathered data on a small temperature discontinuity 10 nautical miles (19 km; 12 mi) south of the southern tip of the island of Hawaii and determined that the semipersistent eddy in the lee of the island appeared to be centered about 30 nautical miles (56 km; 35 mi) west of Kailua-Kona, Hawaii.

In early August 1958, Charles H. Gilbert departed Pearl Harbor for her 41st cruise, again in Hawaiian waters. She spent her cruise studying skipjack behavior, and found the fish scarce in the "skipjack concourse" off Lanai, allowing her embarked scientists to contrast conditions in the "concourse" with those found when skipjack were more plentiful there. Her embarked biologists were able to capture the reaction of skipjack to blood, red dye, and tuna extracts on film using her new submersible observation "bucket," and tests of threadfin shad as a new bait for skipjack were very successful. She also occupied oceanographic stations off Barbers Point, Oahu, in support of the International Geophysical Year once each in August and September. She completed her 52-day cruise on 27 September 1958, arriving at a new home port; while she was at sea, POFI officially opened a new docking facility at Kewalo Basin, a commercial fishing harbor in Honolulu, which replaced its facilities at Pearl Harbor. The Kewalo Basin facility became the new base for both Charles H. Gilbert and US FWS Hugh M. Smith.

Charles H. Gilbert left Kewalo Basin on 8 or 9 October 1958 (source gives both dates) to begin her 42nd cruise, intending to make further observations of skipjack feeding behavior in Hawaiian waters. She spent the first half of her cruise in Hawaiian waters, but skipjack were so scarce that she could accomplish nothing, so she moved south to the Line Islands. As POFI scientists expected, she found skipjack there, sighting 39 confirmed schools of skipjack or yellowfin. Scientists used her submersible platform to observe the reaction of skipjack and yellowfin to lamp black dye, chumming with tilapia and mullet, and water sprays. For the first time, scientists were able to observe directly the behavior of yellowfin and compare it to that of skipjack, and they discovered that yellowfin behaved much like skipjack except that they tended to swim below the skipjack at a depth of about 10 feet (3 m) and dash upward to feed on tilapia or mullet chum. She also spent one day each fishing for bait at Fanning Island and Palmyra Island, finding mostly mullet in the 3-to-8-inch (7.6 to 20 cm) range. She returned to Kewalo Basin on 17 November 1958. The turbulence created by the submersible observation platform greatly interfered with its ability to support effective underwater photography and film-making, and it was removed from Charles H. Gilbert after her return to port. The USFWS began to consider alternatives – such as installing underwater television and a porthole in the vessel's hull below the waterline — and their relative costs.

==== 1959 ====
Charles H. Gilbert′s 43rd cruise completed the USFWS's 2 1/2-year oceanographic and fishery research program (devoted primarily to tuna resources) in the Marquesas Islands and Tuamotu Archipelago. Departing Kewalo Basin in early January 1959, she joined the San Diego–based chartered fishing vessel Cape Falcon in the Marquesas, where Cape Falcon conducted exploratory fishing using 24,000 pounds (10,886 kg) of live bait loaded at Almejas Bay, Mexico and Charles H. Gilbert focused on determining the abundance of skipjack and yellowfin along previously explored survey lines. Cape Falcon′s catch was disappointingly small, and Charles H. Gilbert sighted only half the number of schools found during the 1957 and 1958 seasons, with fish averaging only 6 pounds (2.7 kg) and difficult to chum to the vessel. She brought about 1,000 live Marquesan sardinellas back to Hawaii and released them in Maunalua Bay off the south coast of Oahu, the USFWS's eighth release of the fish in Hawaiian waters in the hope of increasing Hawaii's supply of live bait. She returned to Kewalo Basin on 26 March 1959 after 79 days at sea.

Charles H. Gilbert began her 44th cruise in late April 1959. It was the third in a series devoted to developing an understanding of how variations in the presence of water from an extension of the California Current affected the abundance of skipjack in Hawaiian waters. Using temperature and salinity readings, her embarked scientists concluded that California Current water had spread over a large area in the vicinity of Hawaii in May 1959, intermingled with water arriving from the north and west via the Kuroshio Current. She sighted skipjack schools only within 100 nautical miles (190 km; 120 mi) of the Hawaiian Islands, with the most commercially promising schools observed 40 to 60 nautical miles (74 to 111 km; 46 to 69 mi) west and northwest of Kauai in mid-May, and longlined and made plankton tows to determine the variety and abundance of marine life in various water conditions. She concluded her 34-day cruise with her arrival at Kewalo Basin on 1 June 1959. Later that month, the USFWS retired US FWS Hugh M. Smith, leaving Charles H. Gilbert as the USFWS's only Hawaii-based research vessel.

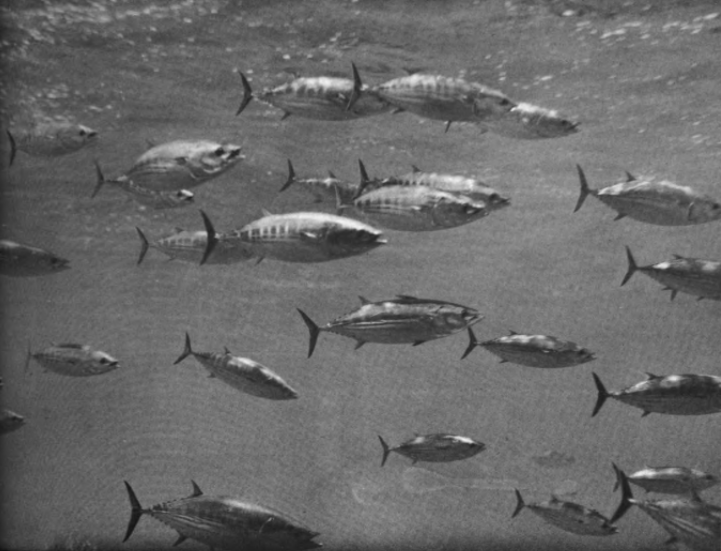
Skipjack tuna photographed from US FWS Charles H. Gilbert′s stern underwater observation chamber 10 to 12 nautical miles (19 to 22 km; 12 to 14 mi) off Barber's Point, Oahu, Hawaii, on 13 July 1959. The fish ranged from 19 to 27 inches (48.3 to 68.6 cm) in length and 5 to 15 pounds (2.3 to 6.8 kg) in weight. From the cover of Commercial Fisheries Review, September 1959.

In late June 1959, the USFWS completed the installation of a new observation chamber aboard Charles H. Gilbert, located within her hull in a special blister aft, below the fishing racks and 7 feet (2.1 m) below the waterline Testing showed that the new chamber was free of the problem of cavitation and the resulting bubbles that had hampered photography from the overside dry chamber she had used earlier, and it had ample room for a photographer to employ still and motion-picture cameras to record fish behaviors. The change made Charles H. Gilbert the world's only tuna-fishing vessel at the time with underwater observation windows, a distinction she held until similar windows were installed amidships aboard the California Department of Fish and Game research vessel Alaska in 1961. With her new observation chamber ready, she departed Kewalo Basin in early July 1959 to make use of it in studying skipjack behavior in Hawaiian waters during her 45th FWS cruise. She experimented with the use of various baits and various amounts of bait, with the use of glittering tinsel and water sprays in conjunction with bait, and with the effect of colored dyes and sounds on feeding skipjack. She filmed skipjack from her observation chamber, finding it to be an "outstanding success;" it was comfortable for an operator to use for several hours at a time, and was free of the bubbles that had plagued the earlier overside platform. She also tested the chamber's performance against that of two types of closed-circuit television. Neither television system showed any advantage over the use of the observation chamber; although the television cameras often could see farther underwater than the cameras used in the chamber, the television systems proved too delicate to adjust and operate under tuna-fishing conditions. She placed 73 skipjack in her live wells – 37 of which later were placed in tanks at the USFWS Honolulu laboratory at Kewalo Basin – and conducted a seal and marine turtle census at the French Frigate Shoals in the Northwestern Hawaiian Islands. She completed her cruise on 3 September 1959 after 60 days at sea. The film she brought back made the USFWS Honolulu laboratory the first fisheries research center to record successfully on film the behavior of skipjack underwater, and it allowed scientists to gain a better understanding of tuna behaviors.

On 15 September 1959, Charles H. Gilbert got underway for another cruise – her 46th FWS cruise – to collect oceanographic data and survey Hawaiian waters for skipjack, as fisheries scientists continued to gather information to enhance their understanding of the relation of water conditions to the local abundance of skipjack. Surveying the extension of the California Current into the Hawaii area, she discovered that higher-salinity water from the North Pacific dominated the waters of Hawaii, with North Pacific water on the northern side of the northwestern main Hawaiian Islands and surrounding the southeastern islands. This was a contrast to the summer of 1959, when the lower-salinity water of the California Current surrounded the islands. Aa a result of the higher salinity, skipjack were scarce near the islands, strengthening the scientists’ hypothesis that water conditions greatly affected the annual success of the commercial skipjack industry in Hawaii. Charles H. Gilbert did have some success baiting skipjack with tilapia; only one school responded to chumming, but she caught 142 skipjack from it, of which she tagged and released 54. She filmed the behavior of skipjack from her observation chamber; investigated a temperature discontinuity she encountered south of Molokai; and longlined and made plankton net tows to survey the types and abundance of marine life in various water conditions. Her longlining catch consisted of a skipjack, a yellowfin, two bigeye tuna, a striped marlin, two sailfish, four oceanic whitetip sharks, four blue sharks, four mahi-mahi, and a lancetfish. She also brought skipjack meat and blood samples back for further analysis. She completed her cruise on 18 October 1959.

On 12 November 1959, Charles H. Gilbert departed Honolulu bound for a shipyard at Portland, Oregon, to undergo major alterations. These included the installation of a new main engine, new living quarters for her crew and embarked scientists, new laboratory space, a new pilothouse, a trawling winch with provisions for handling large trawls over her side, and a new bulbous bow designed to reduce drag and increase her speed, range, fuel efficiency, and stability. The new bow incorporated underwater viewing ports and a second observation chamber, giving her an underwater photography and movie capability both forward and aft. By February 1960, the USFWS was making plans to install an aquarium system aboard Charles H. Gilbert that would allow embarked scientists to fertilize tuna eggs and raise tuna larvae and juvenile tuna while at sea. She emerged from the shipyard with a gross register tonnage of 200.

=== 1960s ===
==== 1960 ====
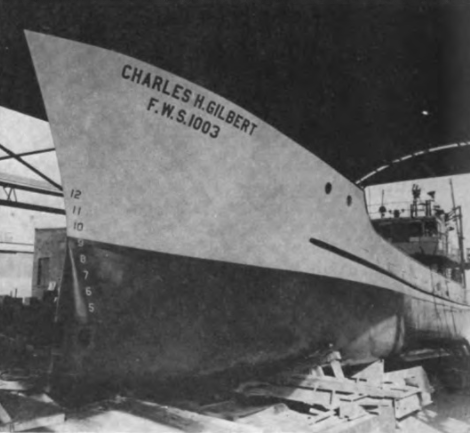
US FWS Charles H. Gilbert, showing the underwater observation chamber in her bulbous bow and her hull number (FWS 1003) painted on her bow. From Commercial Fisheries Review, February 1963.

After the shipyard completed Charles H. Gilbert′s alterations in early 1960, she made a shakedown cruise from Portland, Oregon, to San Pedro, California. She departed San Pedro on 1 April 1960 to begin her 47th cruise, a trip to the eastern tropical Pacific to conduct an oceanographic, biological, and fishing survey off Mexico, operating off the west coast of the Baja California Peninsula, Cabo San Lucas, the Islas Marías, and the Revillagigedo Islands. Primarily using her aft observation chamber, embarked scientists observed and recorded the reaction of tuna to water sprays, tinsel glitter, live bait, dead bait, and different rates of chumming. The water sprays and glitter had no effect on the tuna. Slower chumming rates reduced tuna feeding activity, as did dead bait when compared to live bait. Scientists also noted the varying behavior of different bait species — Californian anchovies, other anchovies, and Pacific thread herring — in the presence of tuna. Overall fishing was poor, totaling 545 skipjack, 678 yellowfin, and 30 little tunnies, but she tagged and released 46 skipjack off Roca Partida; recaptures of the tagged skipjack over the next two months suggested that they were part of a local population that did not range widely in the ocean. Embarked scientists used her new bow observation chamber to observe the behavior of dolphins as they rode her bow wave, and were surprised to find that the dolphins rigidly arched their bodies with their heads and tails depressed, which differed from the scientists' expectation that the dolphins would raise their tails to ride the wave. Her oceanographic activities included the use of bathythermograph casts, surface temperature readings, and salinity samples to determine the location of the California Current between the U.S. West Coast and Hawaii and an effort to determine the temperature structure of water over seamounts and ocean banks, although she discontinued the latter work after two bathythermograph casts around the Revillagigedo Islands due to equipment failure. She brought aboard personnel of the Hawaii State Division of Fish and Game in Mexico for transportation to Hawaii and carried 3,800 snappers of the genus Lutjanus — of which 89 percent survived the voyage – from Manzanillo, Mexico, to Hawaii. She reached Kewalo Basin on 23 May 1960 after an absence of 27 1/2 weeks.

Charles H. Gilbert set out on her 47th cruise on 20 June 1960 to survey a broad area of the Pacific west of Hawaii for albacore spawning grounds, coordinated with a similar survey farther west by the Japanese research vessel Shunyo Maru of the Nankai Regional Fisheries Research Laboratory at Kōchi, Japan. USFWS scientists did not expect her to encounter commercially exploitable numbers of albacore, but rather to gather data on the sexual maturity and fecundity of albacore in the area and on the presence of larval albacore. She occupied 38 longline fishing stations, finding overall fishing poor, although she netted a large number of larval tuna; she made her best catches of juvenile and adult tuna between 10 degrees and 20 degrees North in the waters between Hawaii and Kwajalein, but caught only one female and five male adult albacore. Otherwise, her total longline catch was six yellowfin, 28 bigeye tuna, 15 skipjack, 44 spearfish, 87 sharks, and 34 other fish. She made 15 midwater trawls before her trawling winch failed; the trawls resulted in poor catches, although she caught more organisms at night – mainly shrimp and lanternfish – than during daylight hours. She also conducted a bait reconnaissance at various locations, finding Marshallese sardines (Harengula kunsei) and Old World silversides at Kwajalein, oama (Mullidae) and flagtails at Wake Island, iao (Pranesus insularum) and piha (Spratelloides delicatulus) at Midway Atoll, and flagtails at Laysan Island. She returned to Honolulu on 28 August 1960 after 70 days at sea.

U.S. West Coast–based tuna-fishing vessels had enjoyed increased catches and reduced operating costs by using puretic power blocks – which required fewer crew members for net-handling – to deploy nylon gillnets, which USFWS biologists hypothesized were effective because they reached down through the entire surface layer of warm water in which the tuna lived, with colder, deeper water blocking them from escaping the net by diving. In Hawaiian waters, the warm layer extended much deeper than it did off the U.S. West Coast, so Charles H. Gilbert conducted her 49th cruise off the west coast of Oahu from 12 to 19 September 1960 to experiment with four sets of a makeshift 300-foot (91 m) deep nylon gillnet handled with a power block, using the purse-seining technique to see how skipjack would react to the net in various typical Hawaiian oceanographic conditions as Charles H. Gilbert attempted to catch them. Biologists observed the skipjack from the vessel's observation chambers as well as by diving with the fish, and Charles H. Gilbert used a hydrophone, sonobuoy, and tape recorder to record ship sounds and sounds produced by gillnetting operations. The net caught only 10 skipjack, but USFWS scientists deemed it a useful first step in adopting the latest fishing technologies to Hawaiian conditions in the hope of increasing the productivity of the Hawaii commercial fishing fleet, and developed suggestions for improving the purse-seining technique. She returned to Kewalo Basin having voyaged 173,000 nautical miles (320,000 km; 199,000 mi) in the eight years since her delivery to the USFWS in April 1952.

Charles H. Gilbert got underway on 12 October 1960 for her 50th cruise with an embarked team of scientists led by a geneticist, headed for the equatorial South Pacific to investigate skipjack and yellowfin biology. The seasonal variation in skipjack abundance around Hawaii suggested that the species was migratory, but it remained unclear whether the Pacific contained only a few large, well-traveled populations of skipjack or a larger number of smaller, local populations, and USFWS scientists wished to gather data to determine which of these possibilities reflected reality so as to determine the best way to go about determining how to enable greater commercial exploitation of the Pacific skipjack population. The scientists’ main objective was to take blood samples from skipjacks taken at various South Pacific localities to determine their relationship to populations at other localities. During the cruise, Charles H. Gilbert visited Fanning and Christmas Islands in the Line Islands, then Tahiti, then Rangiroa Atoll in the Tuamotu Archipelago, and finally most of the major islands of the Marquesas. Preliminary scientific findings of the cruise showed little relationship between Hawaiian skipjack and those in the South Pacific or between the skipjack of the Marquesas and those of the Tuamotus. During the cruise, Charles H. Gilbert also searched for shrimp, catching them in 130 of her 168 tows, sexing, weighing, and measuring 50 shrimp from each sample, and measuring bottom temperatures at each location she caught shrimp. She returned to Kewalo Basin on 10 December 1960.

==== 1961 ====
At beginning of 1961, Charles H. Gilbert began a large-scale study of ocean currents around the Hawaiian Islands. Departing for her 51st cruise on 16 January 1961, she set 2,000 drift bottles adrift both east and west of the main Hawaiian Islands, covering an area of 500,000 square miles (1,300,000 km^{2}), traveling as far to the northwest as the French Frigate Shoals – where she also conducted a census of Hawaiian monk seals and marine turtles—and as far south as Johnston Atoll. She also gathered data on water temperatures, salinity, and currents to help determine their relationship to the abundance of tuna schools and planktonic organisms. She searched the French Frigate Shoals and Johnston Atoll for live bait but found it very scarce, and she also encountered few tuna, finding a concentration of small schools only in an area 300 nautical miles (560 km; 350 mi) south of Honolulu. She concluded her cruise on 28 February 1961.

In late March 1961, prior to the onset of Hawaiian summer skipjack-fishing season, Charles H. Gilbert departed Kewalo Basin for a cruise well to the south and west of Hawaii – and outside the waters of the Hawaiian commercial live-bait fishery – to study skipjack distribution as USFWS scientists continued to gather data to unravel the ongoing mystery of skipjack migratory behavior. Her goals included tagging and releasing skipjack; collecting blood samples from them for serological studies in support of the USFWS effort to determine whether skipjack populations were large and traveled long distances or were smaller and more locally distinct; investigating the distribution of water temperatures and salinity levels; releasing drift bottles in support of ocean current studies; and experimenting with the use of gillnets to catch skipjack in surface schools. She found skipjack more abundant near Johnston Atoll and in an area about 150 nautical miles (280 km; 170 mi) south of Oahu than they were to the west between Kauai and the French Frigate Shoals. Operating in generally rough seas in waters west of the main Hawaiian Islands between the French Frigate Shoals and Johnston Atoll, she hoped to test five kinds of bait — threadfin shad, mosquito fish, tilapia, iao, and nehu — against skipjack schools, but she encountered only wild and fast schools of small skipjack, and this prevented her from testing the threadfin shad. She caught 435 skipjack; tagged 242 of them (all near Johnston Atoll); took blood samples from 100 caught near the French Frigate Shoals and 42 from the waters off Kailua, Oahu; and retained five live skipjack for research use in tanks at Kewalo Basin. Her surface reading and bathythermograph casts found that the higher-salinity North Pacific water remained north of the Hawaiian islands, a typical summer pattern. She released 700 drift bottles in waters south of the Hawaiian Islands (between Oahu and the island of Hawaii) and in the channels between the islands, and another 200 in waters within 5 nautical miles (9.3 km; 5.8 mi) of Oahu's coast. From 13 to 16 May 1961, she conducted four experiments off Lanai and off Waianae, Oahu, with an improvised gillnet of a new type made of the same kind of material used in monofilament fishing lines. including three comparative tests of it against a more conventional gillnet made of green-dyed nylon twine. Each net was 600 feet (180 m) long and 24 feet (7.3 m) deep. In the first experiment, the monofilament net was deployed for three hours in an area where skipjack were breaking the surface; it caught none of them. In the second, she set both the monofilament net and the nylon net during live-bait chumming; observers in her underwater observation chambers reported that the nylon net – which caught no skipjack, the observers noting that the fish avoided it – was clearly visible at a distance of 20 to 30 feet (6.1 to 9.1 m), while the monofilament net – which caught 34 skipjack – was nearly invisible. A third experiment in which skipjack were chummed to Charles H. Gilbert′s stern while the nets were drawn around them in a purse-seining technique had to be aborted when the net became entangled in the vessel's propeller, but the monofilament net nonetheless caught 60 skipjack and the nylon net only three. In a final experiment involving pole-and-line fishing in combination with chumming and setting the gillnets, the monofilament net caught 255 skipjack and the nylon one only two. The nets caught a combined 326 skipjack, but all but five were caught in the monofilament net, although observers in the underwater observation chambers noted that skipjack seemed to be able to detect the monofilament net if not in a frenzied state of excitement due to chumming with live bait. Charles H. Gilbert′s crew was able to bring in the net in about 20 minutes using the power block, and found that skipjack in the 3-to-5-pound (1.4 to 2.3 kg) range passed through the power block along with the net without suffering serious injury. USFWS scientists viewed the monofilament net test results as promising and planned further experimentation with a larger monofilament net in the hope of finding a new way for the Hawaii commercial skipjack industry to become more competitive with better-equipped fishermen elsewhere.Charles H. Gilbert returned to port on 17 May 1961 after 52 days at sea. (Note: The May 1961 issue of Commercial Fisheries Review (p.12) describes a five-week voyage Charles H. Gilbert completed on 8 May 1961 – and therefore presumably beginning in early April 1961 – which would have occurred during the vessel's 52-day voyage that began in late March and ended on 18 May, as described in the August 1961 issue (pp. 22–23). The general description of the vessel's activities during the cruise described in the May 1961 issue seems to reflect the more detailed description laid out in the August 1961, and presumably the two voyages are the same.)

Charles H. Gilbert set out on her 53rd cruise on 20 June 1961 to make a detailed oceanographic survey of the waters among and surrounding the Hawaiian Islands. She returned to Kewalo Basin on 30 July 1961 after almost six weeks at sea. During the Pacific Tuna Biology Conference held in Honolulu from 14 to 19 August 1961, Charles H. Gilbert was in port and open for visits along with two other fishery research vessels, the Hawaii State Department of Fish and Game vessel Makua and the Japanese vessel Shoyo Maru.

Charles H. Gilbert′s 54th cruise took her back to the central equatorial Pacific to study tuna behavior under various conditions and collect tuna blood samples. Departing Kewalo Basin on 29 September 1961, she made for the Marquesas Islands, then moved on to the Tuamotu Archipelago to operate off Rangiroa and Makemo; to Tahiti, Scilly Island, and Bora Bora in the Society Islands; and to Christmas Island in the Line Islands before returning to port on 4 December 1961. She collected blood samples from 760 or 780 skipjack (sources disagree) as well as a smaller number of yellowfin – her blood collection work intended to improve USFWS scientists’ understanding of the relationships between different skipjack populations – and she collected water temperature and salinity data to test a hypothesis that environmental factors played a role in the population differences detected through blood analysis. She used high-speed cameras to film the fin and mouth movements of tuna during rapid feeding behavior to allow slow-motion analysis for clues to unraveling the still-unpredictable reactions of tuna to bait and lures. For the first time, embarked scientists tested the effectiveness of plastic skipjack decoys when towed in the water near skipjack schools, finding preliminary evidence that the fish showed some interest in the decoys. In the Marquesas, she also gathered synchronous data on skipjack behavior, stomach contents, and catch rates, and she preserved the digestive tracts of 203 skipjack, 15 yellowfin, and four mahi-mahi for further analysis. She found skipjack moderately abundant throughout her operating area, albeit mostly consisting of schools of smaller fish, and while searching the Marquesas for live bait, she found a moderately good supply of Marquesan sardinellas in some areas, although in smaller schools than encountered in previous visits. During the cruise, she collected reef fishes from 20 localities, collected blood serum from Marquesan freshwater eels; transported 2,000 live pearl oysters from Scilly Island to Bora Bora at the request of authorities in French Polynesia; and in cooperation with the Hawaii Division of Fish and Game brought 7,000 live groupers and snappers from Moorea to Hawaii, where she introduced them into the waters off Oahu to increase the local stock of food fish.

In five cruises during 1961, Charles H. Gilbert released 8,000 drift bottles, of which about 5 percent had been recovered by April 1962, mostly in the Hawaiian Islands.

In December 1961, the USFWS noted that Charles H. Gilbert′s size imposed limitations on the size of the ocean area that scientists at the BCF's Honolulu Laboratory could study, as well as on the types of observations and studies they could carried out at sea. Since mid-1959, she had been the only vessel operated by the laboratory, giving these limitations a more significant impact on the laboratory's research efforts.

==== 1962 ====
Charles H. Gilbert began 1962 with a lengthy cruise to the South Pacific to study tuna in the area bounded by 5 degrees South, 25 degrees South, 160 degrees West, and 167 degrees East — the waters of New Caledonia, Fiji, the Ellice Islands, Tonga, and the Samoan Islands — as well as the area adjacent Christmas Island in the Line Islands. Departing Kewalo Basin on 15 January 1962 bound for Noumea, New Caledonia, she longlined and made plankton and midwater trawling hauls during the passage. She arrived at Noumea on 4 February 1962, where her embarked scientists consulted with colleagues from the Institut français d'Océanie ("French Institute of Oceania") on a cooperative investigation by the research vessel Orsom III. Departing Noumea on 9 February, she proceeded southeast to 172 degrees 30 minutes East, then headed northeast to Suva, Fiji, where she arrived on 16 February. She loaded additional bait and got back underway on 20 February heading northeast to 10°43′S 178°46′E, which she reached on 25 February, then turned southeast for Nukuʻalofa on Tongatapu in Tonga. After calling there from 3 to 9 March, she resumed her cruise, making for Pago Pago, American Samoa. She visited Pago Pago from 15 to 19 March to refuel and load more bait, making a bait survey of Tutuila on 16 and 18 March during her stay, then on 19 March headed from Pago Pago to the vicinity of Christmas Island, which she reached on 28 March. She longlined at two stations off Christmas Island on 28 and 29 March and then headed back to Honolulu, concluding her cruise at Kewalo Basin on 3 April 1962. During the cruise, she occupied 22 longlining stations off New Caledonia, Fiji. Tonga, and the Samoan Islands and caught 49 albacore, 36 yellowfin, 14 bigeye tuna, three skipjack, 17 spearfishes, 46 sharks, and 51 other fishes. One objective of the cruise was to define the spawning of albacore in the South Pacific, and embarked scientists found evidence from the captured albacore that they already had spawned. For serological studies, Charles H. Gilbert collected blood and blood serum samples from albacore, yellowfin, skipjack, bigeye tuna, blue marlin, sailfish, shortbill spearfish, mahi-mahi, barracuda, and wahoo, and blood serum samples from blue sharks, oceanic whitetip sharks, and silky sharks. In 127 plankton hauls, two midwater trawls, and 26 night-light collections, she found few larval tuna and no juvenile tuna, although her testing of a new plastic cylinder for catching small fish such as young tuna suggested it could catch them and keep them alive for transfer to the vessel's on-board aquarium. She also made unsuccessful attempts at artificial fertilization and shipboard rearing of scombrids, but experimented with raising other species, finding that more pelagic species like marlin and mahi-mahi would not eat the food offered them, while Holocentridae and goatfishes fared better in the aquarium. A scarcity of albacore prevented her from tagging and releasing any, but she collected tuna and shark specimens; released a combined 1,680 drift bottles between 5 degrees South and Hawaii during her outbound and homeward voyages, collected yellowfin sperm samples for the Inter-American Tropical Tuna Commission; trolled during daylight hours; recorded sightings of schools of fish; made 245 bathythermograph casts and collected a salinity sample during each cast; transmitted 218 weather observations; ran her thermograph and barograph continuously; and established an albacore sampling program at the fish cannery at American Samoa in conjunction with the Government of American Samoa and the United States Department of Agriculture.

Charles H. Gilbert conducted her 56th cruise from 24 April to 12 May 1962 to collect tuna and other apex predators from the vicinity of Christmas Island for the University of Washington's Laboratory of Radiation Biology. She occupied five longlining stations off the island and caught 154 yellowfin, nine bigeye tuna, a wahoo, a sailfish, a black marlin, a lancetfish, and 15 sharks. She collected eye, liver, and muscle samples from 51 yellowfin, six bigeye tuna, and two spearfish livers from three sharks, and blood samples from 131 yellowfin, nine bigeye tuna, a black marlin, and a sailfish. She also made plankton and nekton tows, as well as midwater trawls to a depth of 70 meters (230 ft); collected water samples from the surface to a depth of 1,200 meters (3,937 ft); made a combined 82 bathythermograph casts and collections of salinity samples at intervals of about every 30 nautical miles (56 km; 35 mi) during her outbound and homeward voyages and four bathythermograph casts and salinity sample collections in the vicinity of Christmas Island; occupied two night-light stations; ran her thermograph continuously; and recorded sightings of tuna schools. During her outbound voyage from Honolulu, she released one case (20 bottles) of drift bottles every hour for the first six hours after departure and then one case every three hours after that until she reached 15 degrees North; on her return trip, she dropped one case at 15 degrees North and another three hours later.

Her 57th cruise, which she conducted from 4 to 25 June 1962, was a similar apex predator collection trip for the University of Washington. Again occupying five longline stations in the vicinity of Christmas Island, Charles H. Gilbert caught 128 yellow, 12 skipjack, three bigeye tuna, a wahoo, a striped marlin, a lancetfish, and 21 sharks. She took eye samples from eight yellowfin and two skipjack, liver and muscle samples from 27 yellowfin, 12 skipjack, three bigeye tuna, a wahoo, and a striped marlin, and blood samples from yellowfin, skipjack, bigeye tuna, a wahoo, and a striped marlin. She also made plankton and nekton tows to a depth of 100 meters (328 ft) and collected water samples to a depth of 300 meters (984 ft).

Charles H. Gilbert′s 58th cruise was an exploratory fishing trip in Hawaiian waters between Oahu and the French Frigate Shoals which began on 10 July 1962. She caught 39 skipjack, all 40 to 60 nautical miles (74 to 111 km; 46 to 69 mi) west of Niihau, and others while trolling, and she collected blood samples from 16 of them. She collected plankton and supplemented the live bait she brought from Oahu with iao she captured at the French Frigate Shoals. She also released drift bottles in groups of about 100 at four locations (Mānana, Kailua Bay, Laie Point, and Mokoliʻi) off the east coast of Oahu. She returned to Kewalo Basin on 19 July 1962.

Charles H. Gilbert departed Kewalo Basin for her 59th cruise – another trip to collect information on apex predators for the University of Washington – on 23 July 1962. She first made for Christmas Island, making bathythermograph casts and taking surface salinity samples every 30 nautical miles (56 km; 35 mi); releasing a group of 20 drift cards once every hour for the first six hours after departure and then once every three hours until she reached 15 degrees North; and making surface plankton tows en route. Arriving at Christmas Island on 29 July, she got back underway the same day, proceeded to west-southwest as far as the equator, and then retraced her route back to Christmas Island, longlining, collecting serological samples, and making plankton tows to a depth of 50 meters (164 ft) and Nansen bottle casts to a depth of 300 meters (984 ft) along both legs of the voyage segment. She arrived at Christmas Island again on 6 August 1962, then spent 8–10 August fishing northwestward through the Line Islands, off Christmas Island, Washington Island, Fanning Island, and finally Palmyra Atoll. She departed Palmyra on 11 August to return home, again making bathythermograph casts and taking surface salinity samples every 30 nautical miles (56 km; 35 mi); releasing a group of 20 drift cards each hour during the last four hours of the voyage; and making surface plankton tows en route. She arrived at Kewalo Basin on 15 August 1962. During the cruise, she occupied five longline stations, making bathythermograph casts and collecting surface salinity samples at each and catching 23 yellowfin, nine bigeye tuna, four skipjack, an albacore, a sailfish, four marlin, a wahoo, and five sharks; collected muscle and liver tissue samples from all of these fish and eye tissue samples from seven of the yellowfin; collected eye, muscle and liver samples and vertebrae from four other yellowfin caught while live-bait fishing or trolling; collected blood samples from a total of 54 yellowfin, nine bigeye tuna, five skipjack, an albacore, a sailfish, a wahoo, and four marlin; and preserved the stomach contents of 25 tuna and marlins and three bigeye tuna skeletons.

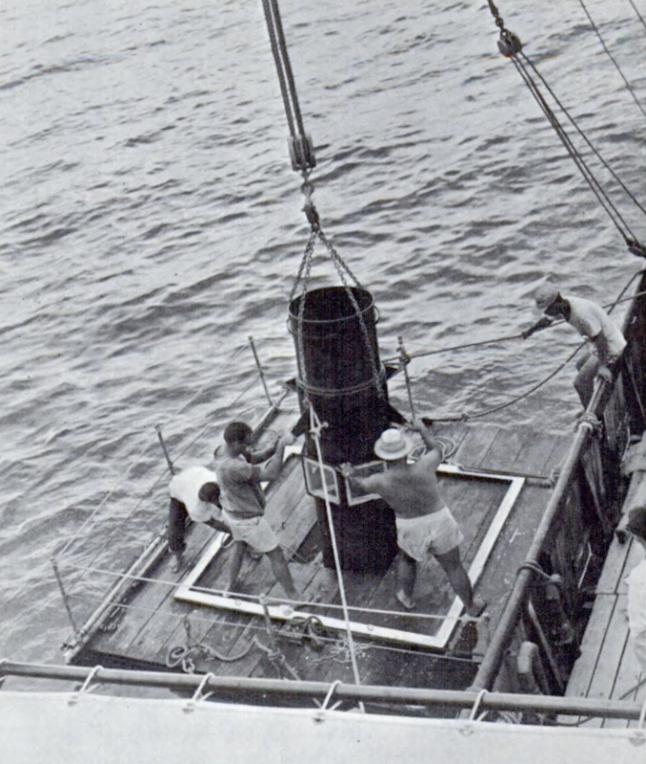
US FWS Charles H. Gilbert lowers the research raft Nenue′s underwater observation chamber onto Nenue in Hawaiian waters, September–October 1962. From Commercial Fisheries Review, December 1962.

Noting that any sizable drifting object tends to attract sea life and can create good fishing conditions, especially for mahi-mahi in Hawaiian waters and for tuna in various parts of the Pacific, the Honolulu Laboratory decided to study this phenomenon. It constructed Nenue, a 12-by-12-foot (3.7 by 3.7 m) raft equipped with an underwater viewing chamber and designed to serve as a floating laboratory for a team of scientists while they studied the association of fish and flotsam, how fish aggregated around a floating object react, and how commercial fishermen could put that reaction to practical use. For her 60th cruise, Charles H. Gilbert was assigned to serve as the support vessel for the first expedition employing Nenue, dubbed the "Koalana I" expedition. She departed Kewalo Basin with Nenue aboard on 26 September 1962 and launched the raft with four scientists aboard in Kealakekua Bay 10 nautical miles (19 km; 12 mi) off Napoopoo on the Kona Coast of the island of Hawaii on 27 September. Nenue then drifted between 19 degrees and 20 degrees North within 10 to 11 nautical miles (19 to 20 km; 12 to 13 mi) of shore. Charles H. Gilbert remained within sight and walkie-talkie range of Nenue at all times. Nenue drifted north at an unexpectedly fast 4 miles per hour (3.5 kn; 6.4 km/h), and on four occasions Charles H. Gilbert had to take Nenue under tow to prevent the raft from drifting ashore or into dangerously rough water, personnel involved in the expedition finding that Nenue could never be left to drift for more than 50 hours without requiring towing assistance. While Nenue drifted, scientists and observers aboard both Charles H. Gilbert and Nenue recorded the behaviors of fish, marine mammals, and seabirds around the raft. Charles H. Gilbert also supplemented 106 hours of underwater observation by the scientists aboard Nenue with 10 hours of observation from her own underwater observation chambers; scouted for fish around the raft and took environmental samples within 1 to 2 nautical miles (1.9 to 3.7 km; 1.2 to 2.3 mi) of Nenue; and made plankton hauls, weather observations, and bathythermograph casts and tooksalinity reasons in the area. The expedition also released 289 drift cards, 10 at a time at each bathythermograph cast. After bringing Nenue back aboard, Charles H. Gilbert returned to Kewalo Basin on 12 October 1962.

Charles H. Gilbert devoted her 62nd cruise, which began on 26 November 1962, to capturing live skipjack for use in studying their behavior, senses, and learning abilities in shoreside study tanks. Using delicate fish-handling techniques developed by the Honolulu Laboratory, she spent the entire cruise within 65 nautical miles (120 km; 75 mi) of Oahu, shuttling back and forth between the fishing grounds and Kewalo Basin and bringing back 105 live fish (13 skipjack, 18 yellowfin, 61 little tunny, and 13 frigate tuna). Embarked scientists also used her underwater observation chambers to observe and film skipjack as they fed on tilapia accompanied by water sprays and on nehu; collected blood samples from 98 skipjack which did not survive capture to support research into the size and number of distinct Pacific skipjack populations; preserved the first right gill arch of 56 skipjack, 13 little tunny, and six frigate tuna; and on 28 November 1962 embarked for a day a writer from the United States Naval Photographic Center in Washington, D.C., who was working on a script on oceanographic research in the United States. She concluded the cruise on 18 December 1962.

==== 1963 ====
To begin 1963, Charles H. Gilbert conducted the "Boundary I" cruise, beginning a new effort to investigate the waters about 450 nautical miles (830 km; 520 mi) east of the Hawaiian Islands, where USFWS scientists hypothesized that skipjack migrated during the winter, when they became scarce in Hawaiian waters. "Boundary" in the cruise's name referred to the boundary between the waters of the California Current and the central North Pacific, where previous cruises had shown that skipjack appeared in abundance during the summer, and the cruise was designed to detect the location of the boundary, determine whether skipjack remained abundant along it during the winter, when it lay to the south and east of Hawaii, and take blood samples to establish whether the skipjack there were the same population that appeared off Hawaii each summer or belonged to a separate population. Fisheries scientists believed that the Pacific yellowfin fishery was reaching its natural limit and that skipjack offered the greatest commercial fishery production potential of any tuna species, both factors emphasizing a need to understand the seasonal distribution of skipjack. Unable to carry enough live bait for a two-month cruise, Charles H. Gilbert also was tasked to test a new fishing method for skipjack, using longlines of the types normally used for larger tuna and marlin and a smaller kind of longline usually used for salmon fishing in the northwestern Pacific. She set out from Kewalo Basin on 10 January 1963 and, although she found the water boundary and ran salinity and isotherm sections across it, she did not encounter a single school of tuna during her cruise; she occupied longline stations both north and south of the boundary, but caught only nine skipjack. She measured them and collected blood samples from each of them and preserved gonads and stomachs from many of them. She found mahi-mahi and pompano dolphinfish quite common at all stations, and she made meristic counts of 90 mahi-mahi for comparison with 60 pompano that she preserved. She also conducted plankton tows, occupied 10 night-light stations, released drift bottles and drift cards, and gathered temperature data with her recording thermograph. She completed her cruise on 2 March 1963.

Charles H. Gilbert′s 64th and 65th cruises each took place in two parts. She departed to begin her 64th cruise on 9 April 1963 with oceanographers embarked to study large oceanic eddies — 20 to 50 nautical miles (37 to 93 km; 23 to 58 mi) across and rotating once every ten days – which USFWS scientists hypothesized existed southwest of Oahu between the Hawaiian Islands and the North Equatorial Current. When about 80 nautical miles (150 km; 92 mi) southwest of Honolulu on 10 April, they detected an upward bulge of colder water that would be expected in the center of an eddy, so they deployed nine drogues, one suspended at a depth of 2,000 feet (610 m) and the rest at 60 feet (18 m). She monitored the drogues for three days. The result was what the August 1963 issue of Commercial Fisheries Review described as "an unprecedentedly fine set of measurements in the open sea" showing that the eddy was moving west at 5 to 8 nautical miles (9.3 to 14.8 km; 5.8 to 9.2 mi) per day and rotating at a speed of 40 nautical miles (74 km; 46 mi) per day near its outer edge and 10 nautical miles (19 km; 12 mi) per day nearer its center. Charles H. Gilbert then began the first phase of her 65th cruise, which took place from 17 to 23 April 1963. During her 65th cruise, she operated south and west of Oahu and never more than 45 nautical miles (83 km; 52 mi) off the coast, collecting live fish for use in behavior research in the Honolulu Laboratory's tanks. Completing this phase, she resumed the activities of her 64th cruise, making a second visit to the eddy after an absence of 10 days. She wrapped up the 64th cruise on 28 April 1963 after oceanographers discovered that the eddy had broken up into four or five smaller eddies with a circulation pattern too complex to study with drogues, although fisheries scientists hoped that the data gathered on the 64th cruise would improve their understanding of the relationship between eddies and the abundance of fish. Charles H. Gilbert then conducted the second phase of her 65th cruise from 6 to 20 May 1963, resuming the collection of live fish within 45 nautical miles (83 km; 52 mi) of the south and west coasts of Oahu. Experimenting with the use of her stern bait tank to transport live tuna and achieving a 93 percent survival rate among captured fish, she brought back 55 live skipjack, seven live yellowfin, and seven live little tunny during the two phases of her 65th cruise. Embarked scientists also took blood samples from 221 skipjack; used her underwater observation chambers to observe and film skipjack as they fed on live tilapia with water sprays and on live nehu; and preserved and froze the gill arches of three mahi-mahi in support of behavior studies.

During her 66th cruise, another oceanographic cruise which she made from 7 to 23 June 1963, Charles H. Gilbert discovered a new subsurface current feature of the North Pacific Ocean. Operating along longitude 153 degrees 30 minutes West between 22 degrees and 15 degrees 22 minutes North and using bathythermograph casts to a depth of 300 meters (984 ft) at nine stations to make a hydrographic section and find thermoclines and isotherms, her embarked oceanographers sought to investigate the physical nature of the subsurface boundary between the waters of the North Pacific and the equatorial Pacific, determine the structure of currents at the boundary, make current crosses to characterize the shear within the mixed surface currents and deflection of the surface currents by the prevailing winds, and obtain simultaneous carbon-14 measurements. Using drogues set at a depth of 350 feet (107 m), they found the new subsurface current moving northeast within the generally westward-flowing North Equatorial Current at an average rate of 5 nautical miles (9.3 km; 5.8 mi) a day. Oceanographers associated this current with water density gradients noted in the vicinity of 16°00′N 153°30′W. Charles H. Gilbert also released 260 drift cards, ran her recording thermograph and barograph continuously, reported weather observations every four hours, made bathythermograph casts and took salinity samples every three hours, reported indications of schools of tuna, and trolled, and from 11 to 17 June she made hourly air temperature and barometric pressure readings.

Charles H. Gilbert′s 67th cruise, dubbed "Boundary II," continued the "Boundary" cruise series – an effort to improve understanding of the relationship of tuna abundance to the location of the boundary between the waters of the California Current Extension and North Pacific waters, believed to influence the abundance of skipjack in Hawaiian waters – begun in 1962. Departing Kewalo Basin on 1 July 1963, she tested her modified longline gear off the Kona Coast of the island of Hawaii, then made for a study area 300 nautical miles (560 km; 350 mi) southeast of Hawaii, where she longlined at 12 stations along longitude 150 degrees West between 14 degrees and 22 degrees North, using surface salinity observations that this route included stations south of, within, and north of the boundary. She caught more fish in general, as well as more tuna specifically, in California Current water to the south of the boundary than in North Pacific water to its north; her longline tuna catch consisted of an albacore and a skipjack north of the boundary, eight bigeye tuna and two skipjack in the boundary zone, and 14 bigeye tuna south of the boundary. Her catch of mahi-mahi and large blue shark also increased as she moved southward, but her catch of lancetfish decreased. Her embarked scientists measured and preserved the stomachs of all fish caught by longline. She also caught 57 mahi-mahi while line-and-pole fishing using live tilapia as bait, sampled 20 of them for length, weight, and sex, and examined their stomach contents. During her cruise, she made 12 surface plankton tows; occupied five night-light stations; collected blood samples from 12 bigeye tuna, two skipjack, and a blue marlin; released a combined total of 1,000 drift cards in the study area and in the lee of Oahu, Molokai, Maui, and the island of Hawaii; tested two small-mesh gillnets, both 12 feet (3.7 m) long and 50 feet (15 m) deep, for the Albacore Ecology Program, catching no fish; ran her recording thermograph and barograph continuously while at sea; and brought two live mahi-mahi back to Kewalo Basin for research. She returned to port on 4 August 1963.

For her 68th cruise, Charles H. Gilbert gathered oceanographic data on a large eddy located south of the Hawaiian Islands, operating in area bounded by 19 degrees 30 minutes North, 20 degrees North 30 minutes North, 156 degrees 30 minutes West, and 158 degrees West. In Phase I of the cruise (21–25 August 1963) — during which shipboard and scientific activities were photographed for a television program – she located a thermal dome associated with the eddy in the vicinity of 20°25′N 157°26′W, launched drogues about 25 nautical miles (46 km; 29 mi) from it, and tracked them over the next three days. During Phase II (26–29 August 1963), she continued to track the drogues, to within 10 nautical miles (19 km; 12 mi) of their starting point, finding the drogues moved at an average speed of 1.5 knots (2.8 km/h; 1.7 mph). She released 60 drift cards and 80 drift bottles during the cruise, and also ran her thermograph and barograph continuously; caught nine mahi-mahi while trolling; and kept a watch for schools of fish, finding no clear association between them and the eddy.

On 7 October 1963, Charles H. Gilbert departed Kewalo Basin for a long cruise— her 69th, designated Ahipalapa II, a name derived from the Hawaiian word for albacore – to continue the study begun in the spring of 1962 of the albacore spawning season and spawning grounds in the South Pacific. Her itinerary took her to Marakei in the Gilbert Islands; Suva in the Fiji Islands; Espiritu Santo in the New Hebrides Islands; Nouméa, New Caledonia; and Pago Pago, American Samoa. She focused her albacore investigation in the waters around the New Hebrides, Fiji, New Caledonia, and American Samoa, where she longlined at 19 stations over 19 days and caught 204 albacore along with 21 yellowfin, 17 bigeye tuna, four skipjack, and six other tuna too badly damaged to identify, along with 10 spearfishes, 20 sharks, and 51 other fish. Embarked scientists reported that the albacore were not quite ready to spawn when caught. They collected blood samples from albacore, yellowfin, skipjack, bigeye tuna, blue marlin, oceanic white-tip sharks, and blue sharks, which they air-shipped to Honolulu during a port call at Suva. Charles H. Gilbert made 152 plankton hauls as well as three trawls, eight night-light and four small-mesh gillnet collections to capture larval and juvenile tuna – her embarked scientists making a preliminary assessment that a "fair number" of larval tuna were present – and collected the stomachs of large fish that prey on small tunas, all to provide additional cross-checks on spawning assessments. During her stop at Marakei, she collected marine algae and reef fishes for an ichthyotoxicity study at the University of Hawaii. At Espiritu Santo, where a Japanese tuna fishery was based, her personnel consulted with industry and government personnel; at Nouméa, they held discussions on cooperative tuna investigation with representatives of the Institut Francais d’Oceanie ("French Institute of Oceania"), and at Pago Pago they consulted with personnel of the Bureau of Commercial Fisheries field laboratory there. A participant South Korean scientist of the Agency for International Development boarded Charles H. Gilbert at Honolulu and completed the first phase of his training aboard her before disembarking at Pago Pago to spend several months of additional training aboard commercial fishing boats based there. Charles H. Gilbert also tagged and released seven albacore; made 172 bathythermograph casts and took simultaneous salinity samples; made 34 drift card releases coincident with the first 35 bathythermograph casts; made 197 weather observations; collected all remoras found attached to captured fish and other objects for return alive to Honolulu; preserved all flying fish which landed on deck; and ran her thermograph and barograph continuously. She returned to Kewalo Basin on 13 December 1963, concluding a 9 1/2-week cruise.

==== 1964 ====
Charles H. Gilbert kicked off 1964 with her 70th cruise, which took place in Hawaiian waters from 3 to 22 January to capture live tuna. She brought 23 live skipjack and 38 live little tunnies back to Kewalo Basin for placement in shore ponds.

Charles H. Gilbert conducted her next cruise – her 71st – in two parts. During the first part, she fished for small skipjack and small yellowfin to bring back live specimens for laboratory experiments studying the visual acuity of skipjack and the sound perception of yellowfin. Putting to sea on 3 February 1964, she fished for three days in an area 3 to 5 nautical miles (5.6 to 9.3 km; 3.5 to 5.8 mi) off Makapuʻu, Oahu, and returned to Kewalo Basin on 6 February with 86 live skipjack, 82 live yellowfin, and 28 live frigate tuna, all of the fish ranging in weight from 1.5 to 2 pounds (0.7 to 0.9 kg). She got back underway on 14 February 1964 for part two of the cruise, during which she focused on gathering information on a community of marine organism gathered around a raft. She launched the raft on 22 February 1964 in an upwelling near 00°09′N 149°35′W and allowed it to drift for 193 hours 31 minutes before recovering it on 1 March 1964 at 00°10′N 159°12′W, over which time it moved 576 nautical miles (1,067 km; 663 mi) due west at an average speed of 2.5 knots (4.6 km/h; 2.9 mph). Scrapping their original plans to duplicate the first drift in a second drift, Charles H. Gilbert′s personnel instead sought to launch the raft again at 4 degrees North in an area where tuna had been sighted earlier in the vicinity of the boundary between the South Equatorial Current and the Equatorial Counter Current, but rough weather prevented it. Instead, they launched the raft south of the Cromwell Current at 02°33′S 148°43′W and allowed it to drift for 215 hours 30 minutes, during which it traveled 395 nautical miles (732 km; 455 mi) at an average speed of 1.8 knots (3.3 km/h; 2.1 mph); Charles H. Gilbert recovered the raft at 03°26′S 155°18′W on 20 March 1964. Scientists used her underwater observation chambers to observe marine life around the raft for 90 hours 31 minutes during the first drift and 100 hours 30 minutes during the second, and during the two drifts combined took 1,900 feet (580 m) of color and black-and-white movie film and 548 still photographs. During the second drift, Charles H. Gilbert used sonar to track fish beyond visual range for 15 minutes out of every hour, although her attempts to track individual fish by sonar were unsuccessful. Species observed around the raft included skipjack, yellowfin, mahi-mahi, pompano dolphinfish, mackerel scad, rainbow runner, pilot fish, rudderfish (Psenes cyanophrys), man-of-war fish, common remora, pufferfish of the genus Arothron, blue shark, oceanic whitetip shark, whale shark, and manta ray, as well as single examples of an unidentified shark, a free-swimming remora, a carangid fish, a marine turtle, and a porpoise. She also attempted to sample tuna schools with longlining and live-bait fishing and tag captured tuna, but she caught only oceanic whitetip sharks while occupying five longline stations, and she caught only two tuna, both skipjacks captured while trolling. She encountered no tuna while occupying 16 night-light fishing stations. She also made bathythermograph casts and took surface salinity samples every three hours on cruise tracks and every six hours while drifting; made hourly bathythermograph castsand surface temperature and salinity readings over a 24-hour period on 24–25 February in an area where USFWS scientists thought internal waves might be important, starting at 00°09′N 152°27′W and ending at 00°10′N 153°38′W. She released a total of 920 drift cards during the cruise, releasing them with each bathythermograph cast north of 12 degrees North both during her outbound and homeward voyages as well as at the beginning and end of each drift. She also made daily Secchi disk and Forel color readings while drifting; preserved flying fish which landed on her deck for stomach analysis; and recorded sightings of tuna schools. She returned to Kewalo Basin on 27 March 1964.

Charles H. Gilbert conducted her 72nd cruise – which was devoted to the study of oceanic eddies southwest of the Hawaiian Island – in two phases. During the first phase (14–21 April 1964), she located an eddy with a radius of 70 nautical miles (130 km; 81 mi) due west of the island of Hawaii and due south of Oahu and began a study of its position and thermal structure, although engine trouble forced her to cut her voyage short before she could complete the work or release any drift cards. In the second phase (16–23 May 1964), she could not locate the eddy, although she did find a thermal dome about 60 nautical miles (110 km; 69 mi) southwest of Oahu and began a study of the area where the eddy might have moved since the first phase of the cruise, but hourly bathythermograph casts and salinity samples showed no resemblance to the thermal topography she had encountered when studying the eddy during April. She released 420 drift cards and 157 drift bottles during the second phase of the cruise.

During her 73rd cruise, Charles H. Gilbert made measurements of the Earth's gravity in collaboration with the University of Hawaii's Institute of Geophysics. Departing Kewalo Basin on 29 May 1964, she rendezvoused with the University of Hawaii research vessel Neptune I, after which the two vessels proceeded independently. Despite some questions as to whether a gravimeter could function successfully at sea on a vessel as small asCharles H. Gilbert, good weather allowed her to use a sea gravimeter to measure the Earth's gravitation for some 1,000 nautical miles (1,900 km; 1,200 mi) of her 1,150 nautical miles (2,130 km; 1,320 mi). She returned to port on 4 June 1964.

Charles H. Gilbert got underway for her 73rd cruise, in which she returned to studying tuna biology and making related oceanographic observations, on 16 June 1964. She operated between the island of Hawaii and the French Frigate Shoals in an area bounded by 18 degrees 30 minutes North, 23 degrees 30 minutes North, 154 degrees 30 minutes West, and 166 degrees 20 minutes West. She had success in fishing for skipjack between Kauai and Kaʻula, at Penguin Bank, around the island of Hawaii off the Kona Coast and Hilo, and in the banks region near Nīhoa. She took blood samples from 1,681 skipjack and brought 155 live skipjack, 17 live yellowfin, and four live mackerel tuna back to Kewalo Basin for research ashore. She devoted part of her cruise to fishing in the Hawaiian International Billfish Tournament at Kailua-Kona as a demonstration, catching 189 skipjack and taking 100 blood samples. Her other activities included bathythermograph casts and taking salinity samples every three hours and whenever fishing a school of tuna; releasing drift cards every three hours; and putting a landing parties ashore on Nīhoa, Necker Island, and portions of the French Frigate Shoals to search for drift cards, finding none. She returned to Kewalo Basin on 23 August 1964.

During her 75th cruise, from 14 to 18 September 1964, Charles H. Gilbert fished for scombrids, seeking to bring live ones back to Kewalo Basin for behavioral research and up to 10 specimens which died during fishing operations of each species (other than skipjack) for density determinations. She caught 146 scombrids – 146 skipjack, three little tunnies, two yellowfin, and a mahi-mahi — of which she brought 66 back alive to Kewalo Basin. The mahi-mahi, which died, was brought in for density determination, and embarked scientists took red and white muscle samples from four skipjack for the Pacific Biomedical Research Center at the University of Hawaii.

Charles H. Gilbert put back to sea on 22 September 1964 to search for skipjack and make oceanographic observationsduring her 76th cruise, as USFWS scientists continued to seek information on the whereabouts of skipjack during the autumn and winter, when they virtually disappeared from Hawaiian waters. Her operating area was among the Line Islands and an area east of the islands about 700 nautical miles (1,300 km; 810 mi) south of Oahu from 06°30′N 162°30′W to about 0°00′N 157°30′W and along the area of converging currents bounded by 8 degrees 30 minutes North, 13 degrees 30 minutes North, 158 degrees West, and 150 degrees West. USFWS scientists had determined that skipjack in the Pacific were divided into reproductively isolated subpopulations, two of which made up the summer fishery in Hawaii, and hoped that Charles H. Gilbert would find fish of those two subpopulations during her cruise using blood and blood serum samples, but skipjack fishing was very poor and she caught few examples. However, she did have success in catching yellowfin, and blood sample analysis of them indicated that yellowfin she encountered in and around the Line Islands were from a different subpopulation than yellowfin caught earlier in the Northwestern Hawaiian Islands off Kaʻula. She concluded the cruise with her return to Kewalo Basin on 28 October 1964.

Charles H. Gilbert continued her search for skipjack during her 77th cruise, her final cruise of 1964, which she conducted from 10 to 15 November in Hawaiian waters between Lanai on the east and Niihau and Ka'ula on the west. Her embarked scientists took blood samples from 109 skipjack, all caught from a single school off Niihau, and volume blood samples from 87 of them, and collected and preserved 12 snouts and 12 kidneys from skipjack for study ashore. Charles H. Gilbert simultaneously made bathythermograph casts to a depth of 270 meters (886 ft) and took salinity samples every three hours and as possible after each successful fishing event, and released drift cards at the same time as each bathythermograph cast as well as at hourly intervals off the windward coasts of Oahu and Niihau.

==== 1965 ====
Charles H. Gilbert conducted her first cruise of 1965 – her 78th overall – in two parts to test expendable bathythermograph equipment, fish for scombrids, and study currents in the Kaiwi Channel between Oahu and Molokai. During the first phase (4–7 January 1965), she operated along 157 degrees West between 19 degrees North and 17 degrees 30 minutes North, making expendable bathythermograph casts at three stations in conjunction with the research vessel US FWS Townsend Cromwell; while Townsend Cromwell performed oceanographic casts, Charles H. Gilbert made expendable bathythermograph drops within 197 to 531 feet (60 to 162 m) of Townsend Cromwell. The drops were successful. During the second phase of the cruise (8–23 January 1965), Charles H. Gilbert operated within 25 nautical miles (46 km; 29 mi) of Oahu, catching fish on two of six days of fishing, bringing in 19 skipjack, five yellowfin, four little tunnies, and a frigate mackerel; embarked scientists preserved five snouts and six tongues from skipjack for later study ashore. She also experimented with studying currents through the use of 21 optical targets made of polyurethane sheets and paper released at 1-nautical-mile (1.9 km; 1.2 mi) intervals in the Kaiwi Channel between Laau Point, Molokai, and Koko Head, Oahu; she then took station at mid-channel while an aircraft made a photographic survey of the target release area from an altitude of 10,000 feet (3,048 m).

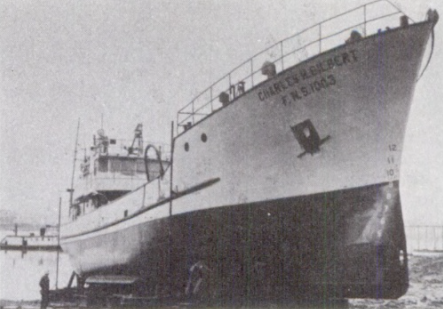
US FWS Charles H. Gilbert, from Commercial Fisheries Review, June 1965. The viewing ports of her bow underwater observation chamber are visible at the bottom of the bow end.

From 10 February to 10 March 1965, Charles H. Gilbert carried out her 79th cruise. She operated in two areas – one southeast of the main Hawaiian Islands bounded by 10 degrees North, 12 degrees North, 149 degrees West, and 158 degrees West, and the other to their northwest bounded by 20 degrees North, 24 degrees North, 158 degrees West, and 170 degrees West — to collect biological data on skipjack tuna. The cruise was the first of several intended to gather data to determine which subpopulations of skipjack inhabited Hawaiian waters and at which times of year. Her visit to the area southeast of the islands was to study tuna in the California Current extension, which USFWS scientists suspected played a major role in bringing skipjack to the waters off Hawaii, while the waters she explored to the northwest were known to have numerous schools of skipjack at various times of year. Her lone successful fishing attempt occurred during five hours of continuous trolling in the northwestern study area 8 nautical miles (15 km; 9.2 mi) northwest of Kaʻula, where she hauled in 70 skipjack and five yellowfin, which her embarked scientists sexed and measured and from which they collected whole blood and blood serum samples; they also took large-volume whole blood samples from 22 skipjack and five yellowfin for use as standards in future reagent studies by USFWS scientists in Honolulu. She made 270-meter (886 ft) bathythermograph casts and took surface temperature readings and salinity samples every three hours during the cruise and after the successful fishing attempt; released drift cards every three hours while 25 nautical miles (46 km; 29 mi) or more from land and every hour while within 25 nautical miles (46 km; 29 mi) of land; occupied seven oceanographic stations at each of which she made a single cast of eight Nansen bottles set at various depths down to 300 meters (984 ft); made standard weather observations; and brought five live yellowfin and two live little tunnies back to Kewalo Basin for behavioral studies. The blood samples she collected indicated that the skipjack she caught off Ka’ula belonged to a subpopulation with lived in Hawaiian waters year-round.

Charles H. Gilbert made her 80th cruise from 5 to 12 April 1965, seeking to capture live tuna and mackerel-like species for behavior studies ashore. Operating south of Oahu between Penguin Bank and Kaena Point and never more than 20 nautical miles (37 km; 23 mi) from shore, she returned to Kewalo Basin with 64 live skipjack, three live yellowfin, and a live little tunny. She put back to sea for her 81st cruise on 19 April 1965, this time to collect blood samples from tuna as part of a new series of cruises seeking biological data on skipjack populations around Hawaii. By May 1965, skipjack were appearing in Hawaiian waters in unprecedented numbers – far greater than found two months earlier — and, operating in fishing grounds around the eight main Hawaiian Islands as well as over banks near Nīhoa, Necker Island, and the French Frigate Shoals, she sampled 1,926 skipjack for blood and blood serum, also measuring and sexing them, and collected a record 2,195 whole blood and 387 blood serum samples from skipjack and 78 whole blood samples from yellowfin. Her personnel also preserved for study tuna-like fish from the stomachs of yellowfin caught off Lanai and bait fish captured off the French Frigate Shoals and Hanalei Bay, Kauai, and brought back 19 live yellowfin and 22 live little tunnies for behavior studies. She made bathythermograph casts and surface water temperature readings and released 620 drift cards. She returned to Kewalo Basin on 13 May 1965. She made a third cruise in the series – her 82nd overall—from 24 to 30 May 1965, fishing within 15 nautical miles (28 km; 17 mi) of Oahu between Kewalo Basin and Brown's Camp to capture more live mackerel-like species for behavior studies, collect tuna specimens for density determinations, and determine the amount of weight lost from large, medium, and small skipjack after the removal of their heads and viscera. This time she brought 189 live fish – 184 skipjack, three little tunnies, and two yellowfin – back to Kewalo Basin.

Charles H. Gilbert operated off the leeward coast of Oahu from 7 to 24 June 1965 for her 83rd cruise, testing plankton and neuston nets in hauls at 68 stations to determine their effectiveness in collecting larval and juvenile tuna. Bright moonlight throughout the cruise diminished the larval tuna catch significantly. Plankton net catches were satisfactory, but she had poor results with the neuston net. She collected eye lenses from 24 skipjack, 17 yellowfin, and 14 fish identified as "albacore" and also made bathythermograph casts and released drift cards.

On 23 July 1965, Charles H. Gilbert set out on her 85th cruise, bound for the west coast of Mexico to gather data that would help USFWS scientists determine whether and to what extent the skipjack found in the California fishery and that of Hawaii represented a common stock or two different subpopulations. She operated off the west coast of the Baja California Peninsula, in the Gulf of California, and around the Revillagigedo Islands to measure, sex, and collect blood samples from skipjack; collect, preserve, and take color photographs of unusual examples; and collect samples for electrophoretic analysis. She hauled in 406 skipjack and 178 yellowfin during the cruise, allowing her to accomplish all of her objectives. She also caught and measured three large marine turtles and observed 76 flocks of seabirds associated with schools of fish. She returned to Kewalo Basin on 7 September 1965. Her 86th cruise followed from 19 to 26 October 1965 and was devoted to catching live scombrids for behavioral studies ashore. Operating with 20 nautical miles (37 km; 23 mi) of Oahu's coast between Moku Manu and Brown's Camp, she collected tuna samples for density determinations; determined the weight lost from small skipjack after removal of their heads, viscera, and red muscle; collected skipjack brains and eye lenses; caught two mahi-mahi while trolling; sampled the oxygen content of water in her transfer tanks; and returned to Kewalo Basin with 161 live skipjack and nine live little tunnies. During her 87th cruise (9–16 November 1965), she focused on collecting surface-caught yellowfin for density determinations and photographs, collecting scombrid blood samples, and bringing live scombrids back for behavior studies. Operating within 100 nautical miles (190 km; 120 mi) of Oahu and Kauai, she made oceanographic and meteorological observations and ran her thermograph continuously, and she brought back 22 live yellowfin and 57 live wavyback skipjack. She also caught 25 wahoo.

==== 1966 ====
Charles H. Gilbert’s 88th cruise – her first of 1966 – last from 6 to 13 January 1966. As during her final cruise of 1965, she remained within 100 nautical miles (190 km; 120 mi) of Oahu and Kauai. Her objectives were to capture live yellowfin, skipjack, little tunny, and frigate tuna; catch live scombrids for behavioral studies; collect yellowfin, skipjack, little tunny, and frigate tuna for red muscle size determination; bring back live bait for use in behavior tank facilities; and collect scombrid eye lenses for amino acid assays. In 36 hours of trolling, she caught 14 yellowfin, 19 little tunny, and two wahoo.

On 20 January 1966, Charles H. Gilbert departed Kewalo Basin for her 89th cruise, bound for the equatorial Pacific to collect blood samples from skipjack ranging in age from a few weeks to a few months old in the waters off the Line Islands and the Samoan Islands. Her trawling and net haul attempts were largely unsuccessful; although she caught many larval tuna, they were too small to provide useful blood samples, and she caught only six young skipjack – along with seven fish of other tuna species – large enough to draw blood from. She took blood samples from four of the young skipjack, demonstrating that blood could be collected from small skipjack, but this fell far short of the hundreds of samples USFWS scientists had hoped she would gather to support their effort to identify different, reproductively distinct skipjack subpopulations. She caught a large number of deep sea fish and shrimp while trawling and quick-froze them for a study of deep-sea parasites at the University of California, Santa Barbara, collected 900 pounds (408 kg) of groupers and snappers during a stop at Palmyra Atoll for study at the University of Hawaii, and brought back 140 live fish, mostly large mullet from Palmyra, for study ashore. She returned to port on 3 March 1966.

For her 90th cruise, Charles H. Gilbert operated in Hawaiian waters from 31 March to 6 April 1966 – again with 100 nautical miles (190 km; 120 mi) of Oahu and Kauai – to collect live yellowfin, skipjack, kawakawa, and frigate tuna for density and red muscle size determination ashore at Kewalo Basin; capture live scombrids for behavioral and sensory threshold experiments at Kewalo Basin; return yellowfin chilled in ice to a fish-packing company to see if blood streaks in cooked fish could be avoided; collect blood samples to support continued study of tuna subpopulations; collect fish eye lenses and brains for enzyme studies; and familiarize Sea Scouts with seamanship and scientific data collection at sea. she was unable to bring back any live fish suitable for the red muscle studies, but she did return to Kewalo Basin with two live yellowfin and a live skipjack back for density determinations, eight live kawakawa for behavioral studies, and 10 yellowfin – five chilled in ice and five drained of blood and chilled – for the packing company. She also collected 75 skipjack blood samples and eye lenses and brains of two mahi-mahi and five kawakawa. While trolling between fishing stations for a total of 40 hours 50 minutes, she caught two skipjack, 11 kawakawa, 18 yellowfin, three mahi-mahi, and a wahoo. She also collected weather data at ten stations, made bathythermograph casts at ten stations, and ran her thermograph and barograph continuously.

During Charles H. Gilbert′s 92nd cruise, from 12 to 17 June 1966, she operated within 30 nautical miles (56 km; 35 mi) of Oahu with the same scientific objectives she had during her 90th. Hydrostatic equilibrium studies. Embarked scientists determined the densities and swim bladder volumes of five yellowfin during the cruise, and she returned to Kewalo Basin with 216 live skipjack and 34 live kawakawa for behavioral studies, but she again caught no scombrids suitable for red muscle size determination, and she also was unable to return yellowfin chilled and bled in various ways to the packing company or collect suitable eye lens and brain samples. In 25 hours of trolling, she caught 10 skipjack, 17 kawakawa, and five yellowfin. She also ran her thermograph and barograph continuously and kept a watch for signs of schools of fish and marine mammals.

The USFWS published few details of Charles H. Gilbert′s activities during the remainder of 1966. However, the October 1966 issue of Commercial Fisheries Review reported that scientists aboard US FWS Townsend Cromwell spotted rarely seen small, young bigeye tuna playing around flotsam while operating off the Hawaiian Islands and hurriedly summoned Charles H. Gilbert — which was better equipped than Townsend Cromwell to transport live fish – to capture them. After Charles H. Gilbert arrived on the scene, she used pole-and line fishing techniques to land the young bigeye tuna, and returned to Kewalo Basin with 89 live ones, all about 20 inches (510 mm) long and around a year old. USFWS scientists hoped that the young fish could expand their understanding of tuna sight, hearing, sense of smell, and locomotion.

==== 1967 ====
Although Charles H. Gilbert was quite active, USFWS publication of information about her operations remained limited in 1967. However, the April 1967 issue of Commercial Fisheries Review reported that she caught a 17-inch (430 mm) female black skipjack 35 nautical miles (65 km; 40 mi) west of Hawaii, 3,000 nautical miles (5,600 km; 3,500 mi) from the black skipjack's previously recorded range and the first time it was found anywhere other than in the coastal waters of Mexico, Central America, northern South America, and the Galápagos Islands. Scientific personnel aboard the vessel offered three possibilities for the catch, saying that the black skipjack's range could be broader than previously thought, or that the fish was merely a stray, or that the black skipjack's range was increasing.

On 28 April 1967, Charles H. Gilbert reached a career milestone, completing her 100th cruise, during which she collected live tuna for behavior studies, returning to Kewalo Basin with 55 live kawakawa and a live yellowfin. She also spent two days testing a sea sled manned by two scuba divers off Waikiki and Waianae, Oahu, designed to allow one diver to serve as its pilot while the other filmed and photographed the interaction of tuna and bait fish. The tests showed that she could tow the sled at 9 knots (17 km/h; 10 mph) on the surface and 2 knots (3.7 km/h; 2.3 mph) at a depth of 45 feet (14 m). The divers took movies and made visual observations of two species of bait fish – nehu and mosquito fish – from the sled, although no tuna were encountered during the sled tests. In her 100 cruises over 16 years of service, Charles H, Gilbert had traveled 325,000 nautical miles (602,000 km; 374,000 mi), averaging 200 days a year at sea, and made eight cruises to the Marquesas Islands and Tahiti, two to the west coast of Mexico, two to San Francisco, California, two to New Caledonia, six to the Line Islands, and three to the Northwestern Hawaiian Islands. The BCF's acting area director in Hawaii said that "A whole generation of oceanographers and fishery biologists received their practical training in research aboard Charles H. Gilbert," adding that "She has made some real contributions to science. For example, just about everything we know about the behavior of tunas in the sea comes from observations made aboard her."

In its July 1967 issue Commercial Fisheries Review reported that Charles H. Gilbert had experimented with nighttime longline fishing for swordfish in Hawaiian waters in the hope of revitalizing Hawaii's flagging longlining industry. Fishermen in Japan and New England had reported success in longlining for swordfish at night, but in 22 fishing attempts off Waianae, Oahu, and Hilo on the island of Hawaii, Charles H. Gilbert caught only 10 swordfish, the largest of them 10 feet (3.0 m) long and weighing 448 pounds (203 kg). Although the catch rate was somewhat better than Hawaiian commercial fishing boats reported for daytime longlining, it was not enough to form the basis of a nighttime swordfish longlining fishery in Hawaiian waters.

From 2 to 7 July 1967, BCF scientists were present daily at the Ninth Annual Hawaiian International Billfish Tournament and on 4 July 1967, Charles H. Gilbert conducted a demonstration cruise for members of the press and tournament officials in conjunction with the tournament.

Charles H. Gilbert conducted her 106th cruise from 30 October to 28 November 1967. A major objective of the cruise was to compare the effectiveness of live-bait pole-and-line fishing for skipjack with nehu (Stolephorus pupureus) and with threadfin shad, as well as by chumming with threadfin shad. Fishing 8 to 28 nautical miles (15 to 52 km; 9.2 to 32.2 mi) west and northwest of Niihau, her personnel observed that nehu dived more steeply and swam more quickly than threadfin shad, leaving the shad closer to the fishing hooks and resulting in higher catch rates when using threadfin shad as bait. She caught 694 skipjack, ranging in length from 49.1 to 67.1 centimeters (19.3 to 26.4 in) and in weight from 6.5 to 18 pounds (2.9 to 8.2 kg). She also spent two weeks (from 15 to 28 November 1967) making 101 bathythermograph lowerings to determine the thermocline structure around the Hawaiian Islands, discovering two major eddies, both 100 nautical miles (185 km; 115 mi) in diameter, rotating at 1 to 2 knots (1.9 to 3.7 km/h; 1.2 to 2.3 mph), and lying southwest of Hawaii. One was centered near 20°N 158°W, rotating counterclockwise and displacing the thermocline about 70 meters (230 ft) above its equilibrium level, and the other near 18°30′N 156°30′W, rotating clockwise and depressing the thermocline about 70 meters (230 ft). They both appeared to be drifting west, although the two-week study period was too short to confirm this. Otherwise, she found the thermocline flat and featureless.

==== 1968–1969 ====
Charles H. Gilbert′s first cruise of 1968, made from 9 January to 24 February 1968, was her 107th. It was an oceanographic cruise that took her to Johnston Atoll. She spent four days in Hawaiian waters south of Maui, Kahoolawe, and Lanai and west of the island of Hawaii, making 37 bathythermograph casts to determine the thermocline topography of the area. She also deployed longline fishing gear at 34 stations to make observations of near-surface currents west of Hawaii and in the vicinity of Johnson Atoll and changes in the currents over time by watching how the gear drifted, also using the gear to fish at each station for tuna and billfish, tagging and releasing all of those brought up alive and in good condition to determine changes in catch rates over time. Her first 24 longline stations, off Kailua-Kona on the island of Hawaii, demonstrated the presence of a current flowing east-southeast toward the southern portion of the Kona Coast, as well as of a counterclockwise eddy in the northern part of the study area. The data she gathered suggested the possibility of a 20-day periodicity in the speed and direction of flow south of the eddy, providing evidence of periodic vortex shedding off Ka Lae (South Point), the southernmost tip of the island of Hawaii.

Among other activities, Charles H. Gilbert during her 108th cruise (20 March–18 April 1968) again tested the relative effectiveness of nehu and threadfin shad as live bait while fishing for skipjack using pole-and-line methods. She caught skipjack at four stations and skipjack, yellowfin, and kawakawa at one, bringing in 737 fish with threadfin shad and 740 with nehu, and experienced an average catch rate of 7.7 fish per minute with threadfin shad and 9.8 per minute with nehu. She used a 20-channel event recorder and automatic time-lapse photography equipment to record successfully catch data and skipjack abundance. Her 109th cruise (16 May–3 August 1968) was similar, and yielded similar results, embarked researchers reporting that there was no meaningful statistical difference in skipjack caught per minute between the use of nehu and that of threadfin shad. Using threadfin shad, she caught 1,286 tuna at a rate of 8.1 per minute with a total weight of 6,726 pounds (3,051 kg), the fish averaging 5.2 pounds (2.4 kg) in weight, while with nehu she caught 1,250 tuna at a rate of 9.8 per minute with a total weight of 9,236 pounds (4,189 kg), the fish averaging 7.4 pounds (3.4 kg) in weight. Observing the behavior of the bait fish, embarked scientists again noted that nehu descended at a steeper angle than threadfin shad, also seeing that threadfin shad did not dodge feeding tuna as vigorously as nehu and were more visible to the human eye than nehu from the vantage point of Charles H. Gilbert′s stern observation chamber. During the cruise, Charles H. Gilbert′s personnel also tested various transportation, handling, and acclimatization techniques for bait fish to improve the survival and use of bait, and collected specimens for researchers at the BCF's Honolulu laboratory, elsewhere in the United States, and in the United Kingdom.

Charles H. Gilbert got underway on 21 August 1968 for her 110th cruise, again to test live bait. She again compared threadfin shad with nehu during pole-and-line fishing, achieving a success factor of 28.6 percent with threadfin shad and 44.4 percent with nehu. She also tested live big-scaled redfin as live bait, chumming them from fresh water and from brackish water made of a mix of 50 percent fresh water and 50 percent sea water without tuna present, her scientists determining that larger redfin dived more quickly and swam faster than smaller ones, but that there was no behavior difference between those chummed from fresh water and those chummed from brackish water and that in neither case did the redfim school. Another experiment involved physiologically altering the behavior of other bait fish — Mozambique tilapia and mosquito fish of the genera Gambusia, Limia, and Mollienesia — by dipping them for one second in hot water, cold water, a five-percent solution of acetic acid, or a five-percent solution of ammonium hydroxide. Researchers noted that only the acetic acid and ammonium hydroxide affected tilapia and mosquito fish behavior; with no tuna present, both chemicals disrupted tilapia schooling completely and made the mosquito fish swim somewhat faster, while with tuna present, the tilapia and mosquito fish were eaten almost immediately and before observers could note any change in the bait fishes' behavior, except that mosquito fish treated with ammonium hydroxide also seemed to swim faster when tuna were present. Skipjack behavior remained unchanged regardless of whether the tilapia or mosquito fish were treated or untreated. Charles H. Gilbert returned to Kewalo Basin on 19 September 1968.

For over a year after the conclusion of Charles H. Gilbert′s 110th cruise in September 1968, the USFWS did not publish accounts of her activities, although she conducted five cruises during the period.

Charles H. Gilbert made her 116th cruise from 1 or 2 October (source gives both dates) to 7 November 1969. She operated in the equatorial waters of the eastern Pacific Ocean about 1,700 nautical miles (3,100 km; 2,000 mi) south of San Diego to collect skipjack and yellowfin for subpopulations analysis. Very few surface tuna schools had been reported in the area before her cruise, and USFWS scientists considered it noteworthy that she sighted 109 tuna schools – skipjack schools and mixed schools of yellowfin and bigeye tuna – far at sea in an area roughly 700 nautical miles (1,300 km; 810 mi) southwest of Clipperton Island, most of them accompanied by flocks of seabirds, largely shearwaters and terns. Using pole-and-line fishing methods with threadfin shad as live bait throughout the cruise, she had no luck in the fishing area from her arrival on 13 October until 21 October 1969, when she finally had her first success in fishing a school, catching skipjack, yellowfin, and bigeye tuna with an average weight of 3 pounds (1.4 kg) at 4°S 119°W. Fishing improved as she moved northward along 119 degrees West to 2 degrees North, and on 24 October 1969 she caught 213 skipjack averaging 17 pounds (7.7 kg) in weight, of which she tagged and released 46. On 26 October she fished two schools at 4°N 119°W and brought in 519 skipjack averaging 5 pounds (2.3 kg), of which she tagged and released 419, as well as 28 yellowfin averaging 4 pounds (1.8 kg), 13 bigeye tuna averaging 5 pounds (2.3 kg), six mahi-mahi averaging 16 pounds (7.3 kg) and a 13-pound (5.9 kg) rainbow runner from the first school, and in only a few minutes of fishing the second school she caught 97 bigeye tuna weighing 10 to 25 pounds (4.5 to 11.3 kg), finding from their stomach contents that they had been feeding on anchovies. On 27 October 1969, she fished two schools of skipjack near 5°N 119°W, catching 49 fish averaging 10 pounds (4.5 kg) from the first school and 110 averaging 8 pounds (3.6 kg) from the second. Having exhausted her supply of live bait, she then headed home. She also trolled during daylight throughout her cruise, catching 67 skipjack, nine yellowfin, nine bigeye tuna, 22 mahi-mahi, and one wahoo in about 400 hours of trolling, and her embarked scientists assessed based on trolling results that the area between 6°N 122°W and 9°N 125°W would yield a large catch if fished using pole-and-line methods. She returned to Honolulu with 259 skipjack and 42 yellowfin for the subpopulation study, her personnel reporting the best fishing in clear, blue water with a temperature of 25 to 28 °C (77 to 82 °F), a thermocline at a depth of 40 to 100 meters (131 to 328 ft), and currents setting easterly.

=== 1970–1973 ===
On 30 January 1970, Charles H. Gilbert set out on her 117th cruise, bound for the waters of the Samoan Islands, where she was tasked with conducting inshore and offshore tuna surveys in the area. She carried with her a load of threadfin shad for use as live bait; although over 75 percent of them died during the 10-day voyage from Honolulu to Samoa, the survivors proved useful as bait. She recorded water temperatures from the surface to a depth of 300 meters (984 ft) using expendable and mechanical bathythermographs, finding a thermocline off Samoa at a depth of 28 to 70 meters (92 to 230 ft) and usually between 30 and 60 meters (98 and 197 ft). During her offshore survey, she used pole-and-line methods to catch 1,075 skipjack ranging in weight from 4 to 17 pounds (1.8 to 7.7 kg), 160 yellowfin ranging from 2.5 to 60 pounds (1.1 to 27.2 kg), and a few other fish; she tagged and released some of her catch. While trolling, she caught 46 skipjack, 30 yellowfin, 31 kawakawa, two mahi-mahi, and a shortbill spearfish. During her inshore survey, she focused on bait fish in American Samoa and Western Samoa. In American Samoa, she found bait fishing conditions at Tafuna Bay, Alofau Bay, and Fagasā bay poor and bait fish scarce, so she caught bait only in Pago Pago Harbor, where over eight days she found Indian mackerel most abundant – although difficult to keep alive in her bait tanks due to oxygen deficiency – followed by the sardine Sardinella melanura and bigeye scad. In Western Samoa, her bait survey was confined to Apia Harbor, where she caught silverside and sardines, the former dying quickly in her bait well but the latter surviving and useful as live bait. She returned to Kewalo Basin on 14 April 1970.

On 3 October 1970, a major reorganization of United States Government scientific agencies in which the new National Oceanic and Atmospheric Administration (NOAA) was created within the United States Department of Commerce. As part of the reorganization, what had been the Bureau of Commercial Fisheries in the USFWS was abolished and its vessels, facilities, and personnel were transferred to the new National Marine Fisheries Service (NMFS), a component of NOAA. Charles H. Gilbert thus spent her final years of government service under the NMFS as NOAAS Charles H. Gilbert.

Neither the USFWS or the NMFS published further accounts of Charles H. Gilbert′s cruises after the completion of her 117th cruise in April 1970, although the September–October 1972 edition of Commercial Fisheries Review reported that either before or during August 1972 she had used electronic "beeper" tags to track four blue marlin for up to 5 1/2 hours.

== Decommissioning and disposal ==
NOAA decommissioned Charles H. Gilbert in February 1973 and sold her in August 1973.

== Legacy ==
Charles H. Gilbert made 130 cruises in nearly 21 years of service with the FWS, USFWS, and NOAA, traveling over 350,000 nautical miles (650,000 km; 400,000 mi). In the January 1974 edition of Commercial Fisheries Review, editor Thomas A. Maner wrote that "her history is written in the scores of published scientific papers that have brought new understanding of the fishes, fisheries, and oceanography of the central Pacific Ocean," and he noted the value of her unique underwater viewports to understanding skipjack behavior and guessed that "a picture of a school of skipjack feeding taken from one of her viewports was probably the most reprinted photograph of fishes ever taken." Referring to the ichthyologist Charles H. Gilbert, Maner offered the opinion that the ship "truly honored the memory of the fine scientist whose name she bore."

== Later career ==
After her sale, the ship became the commercial fishing vessel MV Charles H. Gilbert, home-ported in San Diego, California. Sometime in 1977 she was sold and renamed MV Jade Alaska, and her home port changed to Juneau, Alaska.

Jade Alaska was operating as a fish tender — a commercial vessel that supplies, stores, refrigerates, and transports fish and fish products for fishing vessels at sea — in support of the Alaska-area Pacific cod-fishing fleet when she began taking on water over her port rail at the south end of Shelikof Strait off the west coast of Kodiak Island in Alaska's Kodiak Archipelago on 20 February 2007. Her pumps were ineffective, and her engine room and port void flooded. Her three-person crew sent out a Mayday and contacted the fishing vessel Chisik Island to report that Jade Alaska was in distress, then abandoned ship in a life raft. Jade Alaska rolled onto her port side and sank in 15 minutes. Two emergency position-indicating radiobeacons (EPIRBs) — one aboard Jade Alaska and the other on the life raft – began to operate; a United States Coast Guard helicopter responded and rescued all three members of her crew from the life raft.

== See also ==
- NOAA ships and aircraft
