= NOAAS Townsend Cromwell =

American fisheries research vessel

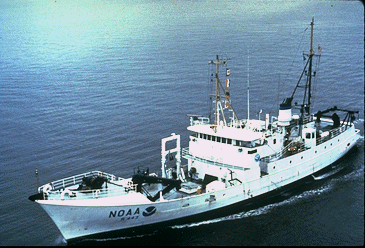
- NOAAS Townsend Cromwell (R 443)

History

U.S. Fish and Wildlife Service
- Name: US FWS Townsend Cromwell
- Namesake: Townsend Cromwell (1922-1958), American oceanographer
- Builder: J. Ray McDermott Company, Morgan City, Louisiana
- Launched: July 1963
- Acquired: November 1963 (delivery)
- Commissioned: 25 January 1964
- Identification: Call sign WTDF
- Fate: Transferred to National Oceanic and Atmospheric Administration 1975

National Oceanic and Atmospheric Administration
- Name: NOAAS Townsend Cromwell (R 443)
- Namesake: Previous name retained
- Acquired: Transferred from Fish and Wildlife Service 1975
- Commissioned: June 1975
- Decommissioned: 10 October 2002
- Home port: Honolulu, Hawaii
- Identification: IMO number: 7309546; MMSI number: 303938000 (as Lau Trader); Call sign: 3DTT (as Lau Trader)
- Fate: Transferred to the Government of American Samoa 2002; Served as New Zealand private yacht MV Townsend Cromwell 2003-2009; Became Fijian passenger-cargo ship MV Lau Trader 2009

General characteristics
- Type: Fisheries research ship
- Tonnage: 564 gross tons; 384 net tons
- Displacement: 652 tons
- Length: 163 ft (50 m)
- Beam: 33 ft (10 m)
- Draft: 12.7 ft (3.9 m)
- Propulsion: Two 400-shp (298-kW) White-Superior geared diesel engines, two three-bladed controllable-pitch propellers
- Speed: 10 knots (19 km/h) (cruising)
- Range: 8,160 nautical miles (15,110 km)
- Endurance: 3 days
- Boats & landing craft carried: One 26 ft (7.9 m) launch; One rigid-hulled inflatable boat
- Complement: 17, plus up to 9 scientists

NOAAS Townsend Cromwell (R 443) was an American fisheries research vessel that was in commission in the National Oceanic and Atmospheric Administration (NOAA) fleet from 1975 to 2002. Prior to her NOAA career, she was in the United States Fish and Wildlife Service's Bureau of Commercial Fisheries fleet from 1963 to 1975 as US FWS Townsend Cromwell.

After her NOAA career, the ship became MV Townsend Cromwell, first as the property of the government of American Samoa from 2002 to 2003 and then as a private yacht in New Zealand from 2003 to 2009. Since 2009, she has operated in Fiji as the passenger-cargo ship MV Lau Trader.

== Construction and commissioning ==
Townsend Cromwell was built for the U.S. Fish and Wildlife Service by the J. Ray McDermott Company in Morgan City, Louisiana. She was launched in July 1963, delivered in November 1963, and commissioned into service in the Fish and Wildlife Service's Bureau of Commercial Fisheries on 25 January 1964 as US FWS Townsend Cromwell. In 1975 she was transferred to NOAA and in June 1975 was commissioned into NOAA's fleet as NOAAS Townsend Cromwell (R 443).

== Characteristics and capabilities ==
Townsend Cromwell had a 40-foot (12-meter) telescoping boom with a lifting capacity of 2,000 pounds (907 kg), a 25-foot (7.6-meter) articulated boom with a lifting capacity of 1,000 pounds (450 kg), a plankton boom, and a movable A-frame. She also had two hydraulic main deck winches, each with a drum capacity of 15,000 feet (4,600 meters) of .322-inch (8.2-mm) line and a maximum pull of 1,200 pounds (540 kg), a hydraulic CTD winch with a drum capacity of 30,000 feet (9,100 meters) of 3/16-inch (4.8-mm) wire rope and a maximum pull of 2,750 pounds (1,250 kg), and a hydraulic net reel winch with a maximum pull of 2,000 pounds (910 kg).

Townsend Cromwell had a 390-square-foot (36.2-square-meter) wet laboratory and a 120-square-foot (11.1-square-meter) electronic laboratory. She also had 200 square feet (18.6 square meters) of scientific specimen freezer space.

Townsend Cromwell carried two boats, a 17-foot (5.2-meter) Boston Whaler fiberglass boat and a 15-foot (4.6-meter) Zodiac inflatable boat, both powered by gasoline outboard motors.

In addition to her crew of 17, Townsend Cromwell could accommodate up to nine scientists.

== Service history ==
=== U.S. Government service ===
On 25 December 1963, Townsend Cromwell arrived at Honolulu, Hawaii, which became her home port for her entire time in United States Government service. She was commissioned into service with the U.S. Fish and Wildlife Service's Bureau of Commercial Fisheries at Honolulu on 25 January 1964 to support the Fish and Wildlife Service's Honolulu Laboratory. Her first 20 cruises involved an oceanographic experiment to characterize the influence of northeast trade winds north of the equator, which contributed to the development of a general circulation model for the waters of the North Pacific Ocean.

In 1975, Townsend Cromwell came under the control of NOAA's Office of Marine and Aviation Operations. Under NOAA control, she conducted fishery and living marine resource research in support of the National Marine Fisheries Service Honolulu Laboratory in Honolulu, using bottom trawls, longlines, and fish traps to collect fish and crustacean specimens. She carried out fisheries assessment surveys, physical and chemical oceanography, marine mammal plans, and coral reef research, operating around the Hawaiian Islands and elsewhere in the waters of the central and western Pacific Ocean.

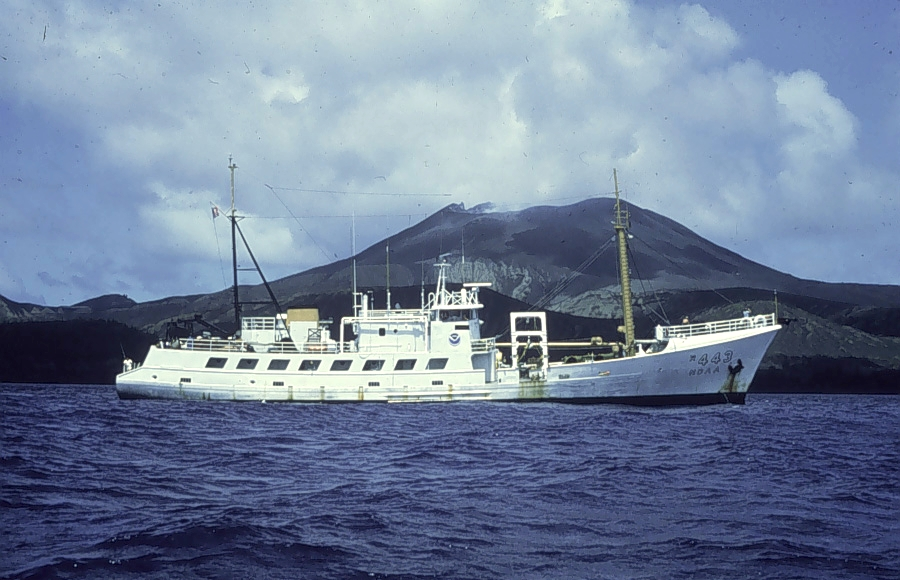
NOAAS Townsend Cromwell (R 443) hove to at Pagan in the Mariana Islands in July 1982.

With the passage of the Magnuson–Stevens Fishery Conservation and Management Act by the United States Congress in 1976 and the U.S. Government's establishment of a 200-nautical-mile fishery conservation zone, Townsend Cromwell began to support U.S. Government- and State of Hawaii-sponsored investigations of marine and land resources of the Northwestern Hawaiian Islands. After completing that work in 1982, she returned to assessments of commercial fishery resources such as spiny lobster, groundfish, and precious corals, and she conducted assessments of the deep shrimp and groundfish fisheries around Guam and the Northern Mariana Islands. She also supported field camps on the Northwestern Hawaiian Islands to count Hawaiian monk seals and green sea turtles under a U.S. Government mandate for preservation of those species, and she took part in oceanographic cruises using satellites to improve the understanding of wind-generated eddies and large frontal systems in Pacific Ocean fisheries areas. In her later years, she participated in resource assessments for the Coral Reef Ecosystem Reserve in the Northwestern Hawaiian Islands. For several years prior to her decommissioning, she took part in multi-agency U.S. Government efforts to remove hundreds of tons of discarded fishing gear and other marine debris from coral reef ecosystems.

Townsend Cromwell's final cruise, a 30-day research expedition for the Northwestern Hawaiian Island Reef Assessment and Monitoring Program, ended at Honolulu on 7 October 2002. After making an estimated 281 research cruises over nearly 39 years of service, she was decommissioned on 10 October 2002. She was replaced by NOAAS Oscar Elton Sette (R 335).

=== Later career ===
After NOAA decommissioned Townsend Cromwell, the U.S. Government transferred her to the Government of American Samoa in accordance with Public Law 106–555, Section 204. As MV Townsend Cromwell, she arrived at Pago Pago, American Samoa, in November 2002. The government of American Samoa hoped to use her to carry passengers and light cargo between Manu'a and Tutuila, but she was not certified to perform such services. In January 2003, the American Samoan government announced that it wanted to sell Townsend Cromwell or exchange her for a more suitable vessel for service to Manu'a.

New Zealand businessman Michael Swann and a partner purchased Townsend Cromwell for use as a yacht. They were convicted in December 2008 of defrauding the Otago District Health Board in New Zealand, and the ship was put up for sale. Purchased by interests in Fiji, she was renamed MV Lau Trader and departed New Zealand in October 2009. With her home port at Suva, Fiji, and owned and managed by Lau Shipping, Lau Trader carries passengers and cargo between islands in eastern Fiji.

== See also ==
- NOAA ships and aircraft
