= Circles of latitude between the 45th parallel north and the 50th parallel north =

Circles of latitude

Following are circles of latitude between the 45th parallel north and the 50th parallel north:

== 46th parallel north ==
46th parallel north (interactive map)

In the United States, the parallel defines part of the border between Washington and Oregon.

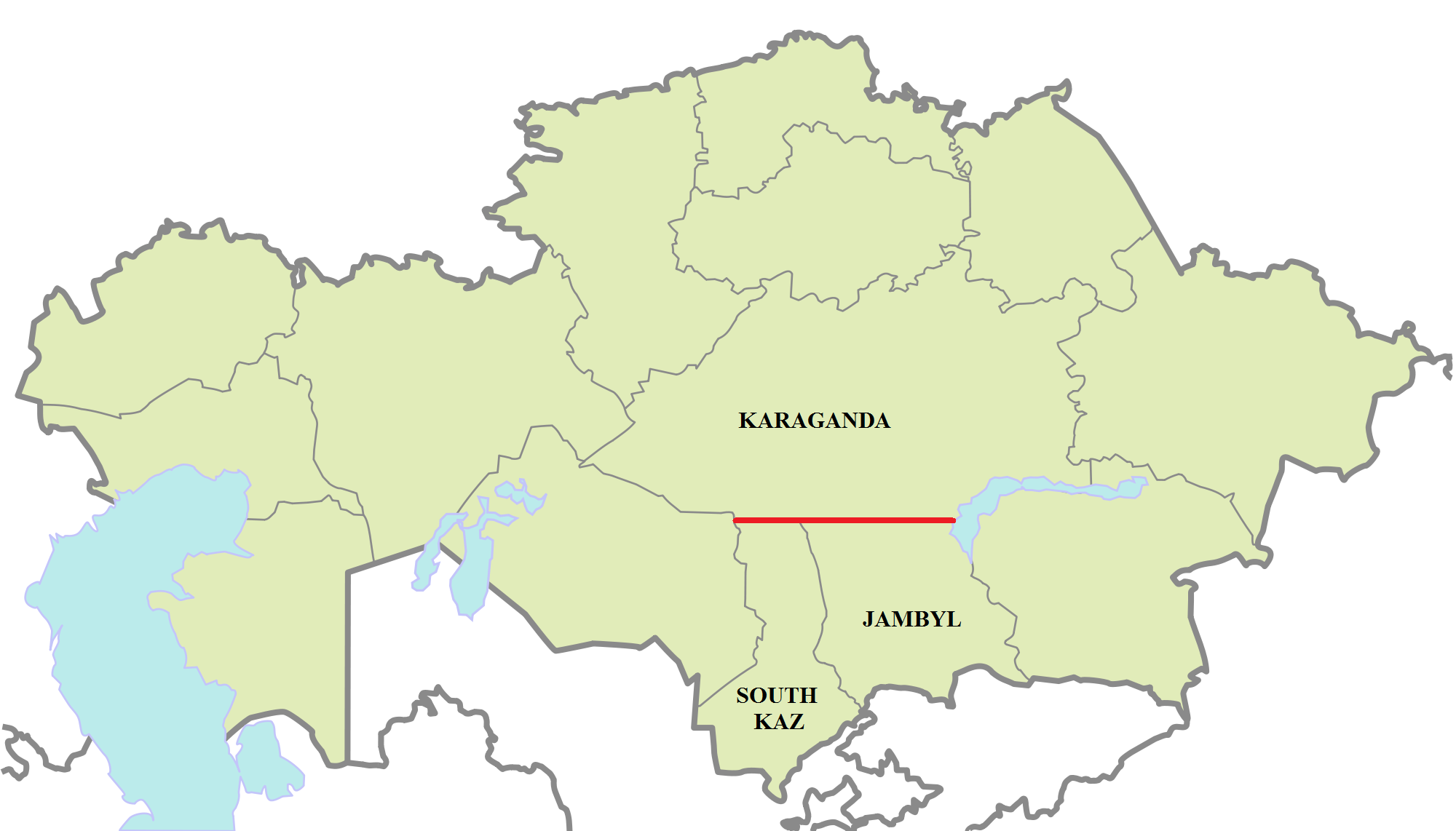
In Kazakhstan, the parallel defines part of the border between Karaganda Region, South Kazakhstan Region and Jambyl Region.

The 46th parallel north is a circle of latitude that is 46 degrees north of the Earth's equatorial plane. It crosses Europe, Asia, the Pacific Ocean, North America, and the Atlantic Ocean.

At this latitude the sun is visible for 15 hours, 45 minutes during the summer solstice and 8 hours, 38 minutes during the winter solstice.

=== Around the world ===
Starting at the Prime Meridian and heading eastwards, the parallel 46° north passes through:

Coordinates	Country, territory or sea	Notes
46°0′N 0°0′E	France	Passing between Melle and Angoulême
46°0′N 1°15′E	France	Passing north of Limoges
46°0′N 4°48′E	France	Passing north of Lyon
46°0′N 7°0′E	Switzerland	Passing through the Valais canton
46°0′N 7°53′E	Italy	Passing through Lake Maggiore near Luino
46°0′N 8°57′E	Switzerland	Passing through Lake Lugano and the city centre of Lugano
46°0′N 9°1′E	Italy	Passing through Lake Como
46°0′N 11°3′E	Italy	Passing just south of Trento
46°0′N 13°3′E	Italy	Passing just south of Udine
46°0′N 13°29′E	Slovenia	Passing just south of Ljubljana
46°0′N 15°42′E	Croatia	
46°0′N 17°18′E	Hungary	
46°0′N 19°4′E	Serbia	For about 7 km
46°0′N 19°9′E	Hungary	For about 4 km
46°0′N 19°12′E	Serbia	For about 2 km
46°0′N 19°14′E	Hungary	For about 5 km
46°0′N 19°18′E	Serbia	passing just south of Subotica
46°0′N 20°22′E	Romania	
46°0′N 28°6′E	Moldova	
46°0′N 28°55′E	Ukraine	Odesa Oblast — passing through Artsyz
46°0′N 30°22′E	Black Sea	
46°0′N 33°37′E	Ukraine	Crimea (claimed and controlled by Russia) — passing just south of Armiansk; Kherson Oblast — passing through Chonhar peninsula and Arabat Spit
46°0′N 34°51′E	Sea of Azov	
46°0′N 37°56′E	Russia	
46°0′N 48°55′E	Caspian Sea	
46°0′N 52°55′E	Kazakhstan	Passing through the Aral Sea and Lake Balkhash
46°0′N 82°30′E	China	Xinjiang
46°0′N 91°0′E	Mongolia	
46°0′N 116°18′E	China	Inner Mongolia; Jilin - for about 7 km Inner Mongolia; Jilin; Heilongjiang — passing about 30 km north of Harbin
46°0′N 133°41′E	Russia	Primorsky Krai
46°0′N 137°51′E	Sea of Japan	
46°0′N 141°58′E	Russia	Sakhalin island
46°0′N 142°7′E	Sea of Okhotsk	
46°0′N 149°56′E	Russia	Island of Urup, Kuril Islands
46°0′N 150°13′E	Pacific Ocean	
46°0′N 123°56′W	United States	Oregon; Washington; Washington/Oregon border Idaho; Montana - passing through Butte; North Dakota (just north of the border with South Dakota); Minnesota; Wisconsin; Michigan
46°0′N 85°37′W	Lake Michigan	
46°0′N 85°0′W	United States	Michigan - Upper Peninsula and Drummond Island
46°0′N 83°30′W	Lake Huron	North Channel - passing just north of Cockburn Island and Manitoulin Island, Ontario, Canada
46°0′N 82°13′W	Canada	Ontario; Quebec - passing just south of Sorel-Tracy
46°0′N 70°17′W	United States	Maine
46°0′N 67°47′W	Canada	New Brunswick - passing just north of Fredericton; Nova Scotia (for about 2 km)
46°0′N 64°0′W	Northumberland Strait	
46°0′N 62°54′W	Canada	Prince Edward Island
46°0′N 62°28′W	Northumberland Strait	
46°0′N 61°33′W	Canada	Nova Scotia - Cape Breton Island
46°0′N 59°51′W	Atlantic Ocean	
46°0′N 1°23′W	France	Île d'Oléron and the mainland

== 47th parallel north ==
47th parallel north (interactive map)

The 47th parallel north is a circle of latitude that is 47 degrees north of the Earth's equatorial plane. It crosses Europe, Asia, the Pacific Ocean, North America, and the Atlantic Ocean.

At this latitude the sun is visible for 15 hours, 54 minutes during the summer solstice and 8 hours, 31 minutes during the winter solstice. This is the northern limit of the visibility of the star θ Scorpii and thus of the 'tail' of the constellation Scorpius.

=== Around the world ===
Starting at the Prime Meridian and heading eastwards, the parallel 47° north passes through:

Coordinates	Country, territory or sea	Notes
47°0′N 0°0′E	France	Passing just south of Nantes, Montsoreau and Bourges
47°0′N 6°38′E	Switzerland	Passing just north of Bern
47°0′N 9°53′E	Austria	
47°0′N 10°23′E	Switzerland	For roughly 300 meters at Grübelekopf
47°0′N 10°23′E	Austria	
47°0′N 11°27′E	Italy	For about 4 km
47°0′N 11°31′E	Austria	For about 3 km
47°0′N 11°34′E	Italy	For about 7 km
47°0′N 11°39′E	Austria	For about 14 km
47°0′N 11°50′E	Italy	
47°0′N 12°8′E	Austria	
47°0′N 16°17′E	Hungary	Passing through Lake Balaton
47°0′N 21°42′E	Romania	Passing just south of Oradea and Iași
47°0′N 28°5′E	Moldova	Passing through Chișinău; Passing through Transnistria
47°0′N 29°36′E	Ukraine	Odesa Oblast; Mykolaiv Oblast — passing through Mykolaiv; Kherson Oblast — passing through Kakhovka Reservoir; Zaporizhzhia Oblast — passing just north of Melitopol passing just south of Mariupol; Donetsk Oblast — passing through Bilosarayska Spit
47°0′N 37°27′E	Sea of Azov	Taganrog Bay
47°0′N 39°1′E	Russia	Passing just south of Rostov-on-Don
47°0′N 48°47′E	Kazakhstan	Just passing through the northern end of the Caspian Sea
47°0′N 82°56′E	China	Xinjiang
47°0′N 83°53′E	Kazakhstan	
47°0′N 84°19′E	China	Xinjiang - for about 11 km
47°0′N 84°27′E	Kazakhstan	
47°0′N 85°10′E	China	Xinjiang
47°0′N 90°44′E	Mongolia	
47°0′N 119°48′E	China	Inner Mongolia; Heilongjiang
47°0′N 134°5′E	Russia	
47°0′N 138°33′E	Sea of Japan	
47°0′N 142°1′E	Russia	Sakhalin island
47°0′N 143°4′E	Sea of Okhotsk	
47°0′N 152°4′E	Russia	Island of Simushir, Kuril Islands
47°0′N 152°10′E	Pacific Ocean	
47°0′N 120°5′W	United States	Washington - passing through the campus of Central Washington University in Ellensburg; Idaho; Montana; North Dakota
47°0′N 96°49′W	Red River of the North	North Dakota - crosses state line with Minnesota on the Red River of the North near Fargo
47°0′N 92°0′W	United States	Minnesota - intersects 92nd Meridian W near Duluth
47°0′N 91°41′W	Lake Superior	Minnesota - crosses over North Shore of Lake Superior at Two Harbors
47°0′N 90°46′W	United States	Wisconsin - Apostle Islands
47°0′N 90°25′W	Lake Superior	
47°0′N 88°57′W	United States	Michigan - Keweenaw Peninsula
47°0′N 88°23′W	Lake Superior	
47°0′N 84°47′W	Canada	Ontario; Quebec - passing just north of Montmagny
47°0′N 69°41′W	United States	Maine
47°0′N 67°47′W	Canada	New Brunswick
47°0′N 64°49′W	Gulf of Saint Lawrence	Northumberland Strait
47°0′N 64°4′W	Canada	Prince Edward Island
47°0′N 64°0′W	Gulf of Saint Lawrence	
47°0′N 60°40′W	Canada	Nova Scotia - Cape Breton Island
47°0′N 60°25′W	Cabot Strait	
47°0′N 59°28′W	Atlantic Ocean	
47°0′N 56°22′W	Saint Pierre and Miquelon	Miquelon Island
47°0′N 56°17′W	Atlantic Ocean	
47°0′N 55°59′W	Canada	Newfoundland and Labrador - Burin Peninsula, Newfoundland Island
47°0′N 55°12′W	Placentia Bay	
47°0′N 54°10′W	Canada	Newfoundland and Labrador - Avalon Peninsula, Newfoundland Island
47°0′N 52°54′W	Atlantic Ocean	
47°0′N 2°17′W	France	Belle-Île-en-Mer and Île de Noirmoutier and mainland

== 48th parallel north ==
48th parallel north (interactive map)

The 48th parallel north is a circle of latitude that is 48 degrees north of the Earth's equatorial plane. It crosses Europe, Asia, the Pacific Ocean, North America, and the Atlantic Ocean.

In Canada the parallel forms part of the border between Quebec and New Brunswick.

Ships heading north along the coast of Washington toward the Strait of Juan de Fuca must make radio contact with Canadian Coast Guard vessel traffic service upon crossing the 48th parallel.

At this latitude the sun is visible for 16 hours, 3 minutes during the summer solstice and 8 hours, 22 minutes during the winter solstice. If the latitude in the northern hemisphere is 48º50' or smaller, it is possible to view both astronomical dawn and dusk every day of the month of July. At the latitude of 48°33′38.58804” North, which is about 62.3 km (38.7 mi) north of this parallel, is the parallel where twilight/nighttime boundary on the June Solstice.

=== Around the world ===
Starting at the Prime Meridian and heading eastwards, the parallel 48° north passes through:

Coordinates	Country, territory or sea	Notes
48°0′N 0°0′E	France	Brains-sur-Gée commune, Sarthe department
48°0′N 7°36′E	Germany	Baden-Württemberg - passing through Freiburg im Breisgau, less than 1 km north of the city centre Bavaria - passing through Lake Ammer, and passing just south of Munich
48°0′N 12°52′E	Austria	
48°0′N 17°9′E	Hungary	For about 8 km
48°0′N 17°16′E	Slovakia	
48°0′N 18°49′E	Hungary	
48°0′N 22°51′E	Ukraine	For about 6 km - Vynohradiv Raion
48°0′N 22°56′E	Romania	For about 4 km
48°0′N 23°0′E	Ukraine	For about 4 km - Vynohradiv Raion
48°0′N 23°3′E	Romania	
48°0′N 23°24′E	Ukraine	Zakarpattia Oblast — passing just south of Rakhiv; Ivano-Frankivsk Oblast; Chernivtsi Oblast
48°0′N 26°11′E	Romania	
48°0′N 27°8′E	Moldova	Passing through Transnistria
48°0′N 28°54′E	Ukraine	Odesa Oblast — passing just north of Balta; Mykolaiv Oblast — passing just north of Yuzhnoukrainsk; Kirovohrad Oblast; Mykolaiv Oblast — for about 8 km Kirovohrad Oblast — for about 2 km Dnipropetrovsk Oblast — passing through Kryvyi Rih; Zaporizhzhia Oblast — passing just north of Zaporizhzhia; Donetsk Oblast — passing through Donetsk; Luhansk Oblast — passing just south of Dovzhansk
48°0′N 39°48′E	Russia	Rostov Oblast; Volgograd Oblast; Kalmykia; Astrakhan Oblast
48°0′N 47°1′E	Kazakhstan	
48°0′N 85°34′E	China	Xinjiang
48°0′N 89°2′E	Mongolia	
48°0′N 89°17′E	China	Xinjiang
48°0′N 89°35′E	Mongolia	Passing just north of Ulaanbaatar
48°0′N 115°30′E	China	Inner Mongolia
48°0′N 117°47′E	Mongolia	
48°0′N 118°28′E	China	Inner Mongolia; Heilongjiang
48°0′N 130°44′E	Russia	Jewish Autonomous Oblast
48°0′N 132°52′E	China	Heilongjiang
48°0′N 134°33′E	Russia	Khabarovsk Krai; Primorsky Krai; Khabarovsk Krai
48°0′N 139°33′E	Strait of Tartary	
48°0′N 142°12′E	Russia	Island of Sakhalin
48°0′N 142°32′E	Sea of Okhotsk	Passing between the islands of Rasshua and Ushishir in Russia's Kuril Island chain
48°0′N 153°10′E	Pacific Ocean	
48°0′N 124°41′W	United States	Washington - Olympic Peninsula (mainland), Whidbey Island, and the mainland at Everett; Idaho; Montana - passing through Fort Peck Dam; North Dakota - just south of Devils Lake; just north of Grand Forks; Minnesota - through Red Lake
48°0′N 89°56′W	Canada	Ontario - for about 7 km
48°0′N 89°50′W	United States	Minnesota - passing through Grand Portage State Park
48°0′N 89°35′W	Canada	Ontario - for about 2 km
48°0′N 89°34′W	Lake Superior	
48°0′N 88°59′W	United States	Michigan - Isle Royale
48°0′N 88°41′W	Lake Superior	
48°0′N 85°54′W	Canada	Ontario; Quebec
48°0′N 69°47′W	Saint Lawrence River	
48°0′N 69°30′W	Canada	Quebec - Île Verte and mainland Quebec / New Brunswick border Quebec; New Brunswick - passing through Campbellton
48°0′N 66°19′W	Baie des Chaleurs	Just passing south of the Gaspé Peninsula, Quebec, Canada
48°0′N 64°33′W	Canada	New Brunswick - Miscou Island - passing just south of the Miscou Island Lighthouse
48°0′N 64°29′W	Gulf of Saint Lawrence	
48°0′N 59°17′W	Canada	Newfoundland and Labrador - island of Newfoundland. From west to east, the parallel enters the island near the Anguille Mountains then passes near the community of North Branch. Further east it passes 1 km north of the Bay d'Espoir Generating Station, and through the community of Queen's Cove.
48°0′N 53°39′W	Trinity Bay	
48°0′N 53°19′W	Canada	Newfoundland and Labrador - Bay de Verde Peninsula, island of Newfoundland (from Hants Harbour to Lower Island Cove)
48°0′N 52°59′W	Atlantic Ocean	
48°0′N 4°30′W	France	Quimper, Brittany

== 49th parallel north ==
49th parallel north (interactive map)

The 49th parallel north is a circle of latitude that is 49° north of Earth's equator. It crosses Europe, Asia, the Pacific Ocean, North America, and the Atlantic Ocean.

The city of Paris is about 15 km (9 mi) south of the 49th parallel and is the largest city between the 48th and 49th parallels. Its main airport, Charles de Gaulle Airport, lies on the parallel.

Roughly 2,030 kilometres (1,260 mi) of the Canada–United States border was designated to follow the 49th parallel from British Columbia to Manitoba on the Canada side, and from Washington to Minnesota on the U.S. side, more specifically from the Strait of Georgia to the Lake of the Woods. This international border was specified in the Anglo-American Convention of 1818 and the Oregon Treaty of 1846, though survey markers placed in the 19th century cause the border to deviate from the 49th parallel by up to 810 metres (2,660 ft).

From a point on the ground at this latitude, the sun is above the horizon for 16 hours, 12 minutes during the summer solstice and 8 hours, 14 minutes during the winter solstice.

This latitude also roughly corresponds to the minimum latitude in which astronomical twilight can last all night near the summer solstice. All-night astronomical twilight lasts from about June 9th to July 2nd."49°00'N, 45°00'E — Sunrise, Sunset, and Daylength, June 2024"."49°00'N, 45°00'E — Sunrise, Sunset, and Daylength, July 2024". At midnight on the summer solstice, the altitude of the sun is about −17.56°."Planets Visible in the Night Sky in 49°00'N, 45°00'E".

Slightly less than one-eighth of the Earth's surface is north of the 49th parallel.

=== Around the world ===
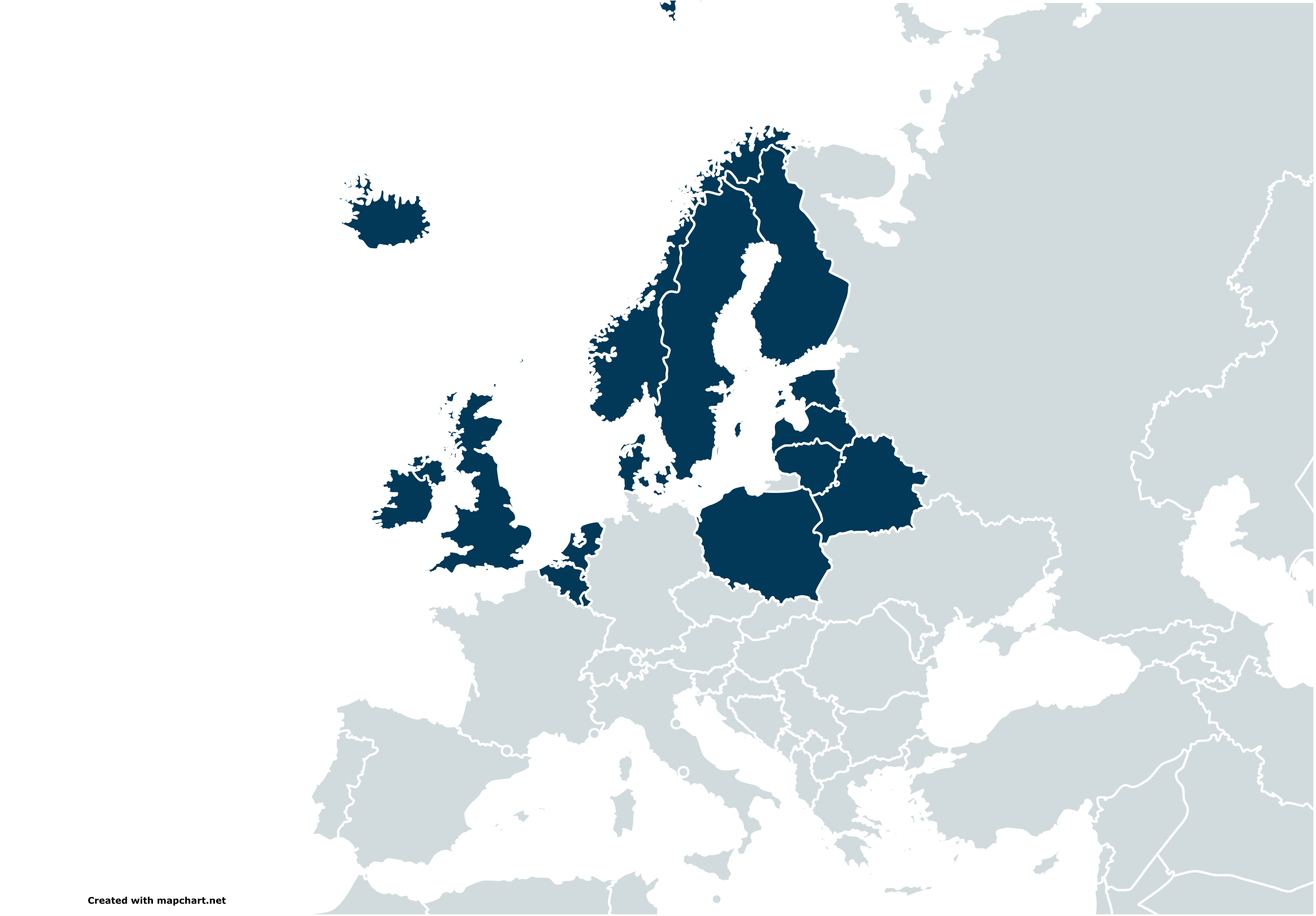
European countries entirely north of 49° N

Starting at the Prime Meridian and heading eastwards, the parallel 49° north passes through:

Coordinates	Country, territory or sea	Notes
49°0′N 0°0′E	France	Normandy; Île-de-France – crossing a runway of Charles de Gaulle Airport; Hauts-de-France; Grand Est
49°0′N 8°4′E	Germany	Rhineland-Palatinate; Baden-Württemberg – passing through Karlsruhe; Bavaria – passing through Regensburg
49°0′N 13°24′E	Czech Republic	Passing just north of České Budějovice
49°0′N 15°0′E	Austria	For about 4.8 km (3 mi)
49°0′N 15°4′E	Czech Republic	For about 5 km (3 mi)
49°0′N 15°8′E	Austria	For about 120 m
49°0′N 15°8′E	Czech Republic	
49°0′N 17°57′E	Slovakia	Trenčín Region; Žilina Region; Prešov Region (passing through Prešov city centre)
49°0′N 22°32′E	Ukraine	Zakarpattia Oblast; Lviv Oblast; Ivano-Frankivsk Oblast – passing through Bolekhiv and Kolomyia; Ternopil Oblast – passing just south of Chortkiv; Khmelnytskyi Oblast; Vinnytsia Oblast – passing just south of Zhmerynka; Cherkassy Oblast – passing through Shpola; Kirovohrad Oblast; Poltava Oblast – passing just through Kremenchuk and Horishni Plavni; Dnipropetrovsk Oblast; Kharkiv Oblast; Donetsk Oblast – passing just through Lyman; Luhanska Oblast – passing through Rubizhne
49°0′N 39°42′E	Russia	Rostov Oblast; Volgograd Oblast
49°0′N 46°55′E	Kazakhstan	
49°0′N 86°44′E	China	Xinjiang
49°0′N 87°55′E	Mongolia	
49°0′N 116°8′E	China	Inner Mongolia; Heilongjiang
49°0′N 130°0′E	Russia	Amur Oblast; Jewish Autonomous Oblast; Khabarovsk Krai
49°0′N 140°21′E	Strait of Tartary	
49°0′N 142°1′E	Russia	Island of Sakhalin
49°0′N 142°57′E	Sea of Okhotsk	Gulf of Patience
49°0′N 144°26′E	Russia	Island of Sakhalin
49°0′N 144°27′E	Sea of Okhotsk	Passing between the islands of Kharimkotan and Ekarma in Russia's Kuril Island chain
49°0′N 154°22′E	Pacific Ocean	
49°0′N 125°41′W	Canada	British Columbia – Vancouver Island, Thetis Island and Galiano Island – passing through Ladysmith
49°0′N 123°34′W	Strait of Georgia	
49°0′N 123°5′W	United States	Washington (Point Roberts)
49°0′N 123°2′W	Boundary Bay	Semiahmoo Bay
49°0′N 122°45′W	United States	Washington
49°0′N 121°56′W	Canada	British Columbia
49°0′N 121°25′W	United States	Washington
49°0′N 120°11′W	Canada	British Columbia
49°0′N 119°49′W	United States	Washington
49°0′N 117°18′W	Canada	British Columbia
49°0′N 116°28′W	United States	Idaho, Montana
49°0′N 115°21′W	Canada	British Columbia
49°0′N 114°57′W	United States	Montana
49°0′N 114°12′W	Canada	British Columbia, Alberta, Saskatchewan
49°0′N 109°41′W	United States	Montana
49°0′N 109°12′W	Canada	Saskatchewan
49°0′N 107°22′W	United States	Montana
49°0′N 106°55′W	Canada	Saskatchewan, Manitoba
49°0′N 98°58′W	United States	North Dakota, Minnesota
49°0′N 96°13′W	Canada	Manitoba
49°0′N 95°17′W	Lake of the Woods	Passing just south of Big Island and Bigsby Island, Ontario, Canada
49°0′N 94°25′W	Canada	Ontario – passing just south of Nipigon; Quebec – passing through Girardville
49°0′N 68°38′W	St. Lawrence River	
49°0′N 66°58′W	Canada	Quebec – Gaspé Peninsula – passing through Les Méchins and Gaspé
49°0′N 64°24′W	Gulf of St. Lawrence	Passing just south of Anticosti Island, Quebec, Canada
49°0′N 58°31′W	Canada	Newfoundland and Labrador – island of Newfoundland – passing through Pasadena and Bishop's Falls
49°0′N 53°44′W	Atlantic Ocean	
49°0′N 5°38′W	English Channel	Gulf of Saint-Malo – passing just south of the island of Jersey
49°0′N 1°33′W	France	Normandy

=== Ordnance Survey of Great Britain ===
The British national grid reference system uses the point 49° N, 2° W as its true origin. 49°00′00″N 2°00′00″W

== 50th parallel north ==
50th parallel north (interactive map)

The 50th parallel north is a circle of latitude that is 50 degrees north of the Earth's equatorial plane. It crosses Europe, Asia, the Pacific Ocean, North America, and the Atlantic Ocean.

At this latitude the sun is visible for 16 hours, 22 minutes during the summer solstice and 8 hours, 4 minutes during the winter solstice. The maximum altitude of the sun during the summer solstice is 63.44 degrees and during the winter solstice it is 16.56 degrees. During the summer solstice, nighttime does not get beyond astronomical twilight, a condition which lasts throughout the month of June. It is possible to view both astronomical dawn and dusk every day of the month of May.

At this latitude, the average sea surface temperature between 1982 and 2011 was about 8.5 °C (47.3 °F).

=== Around the world ===
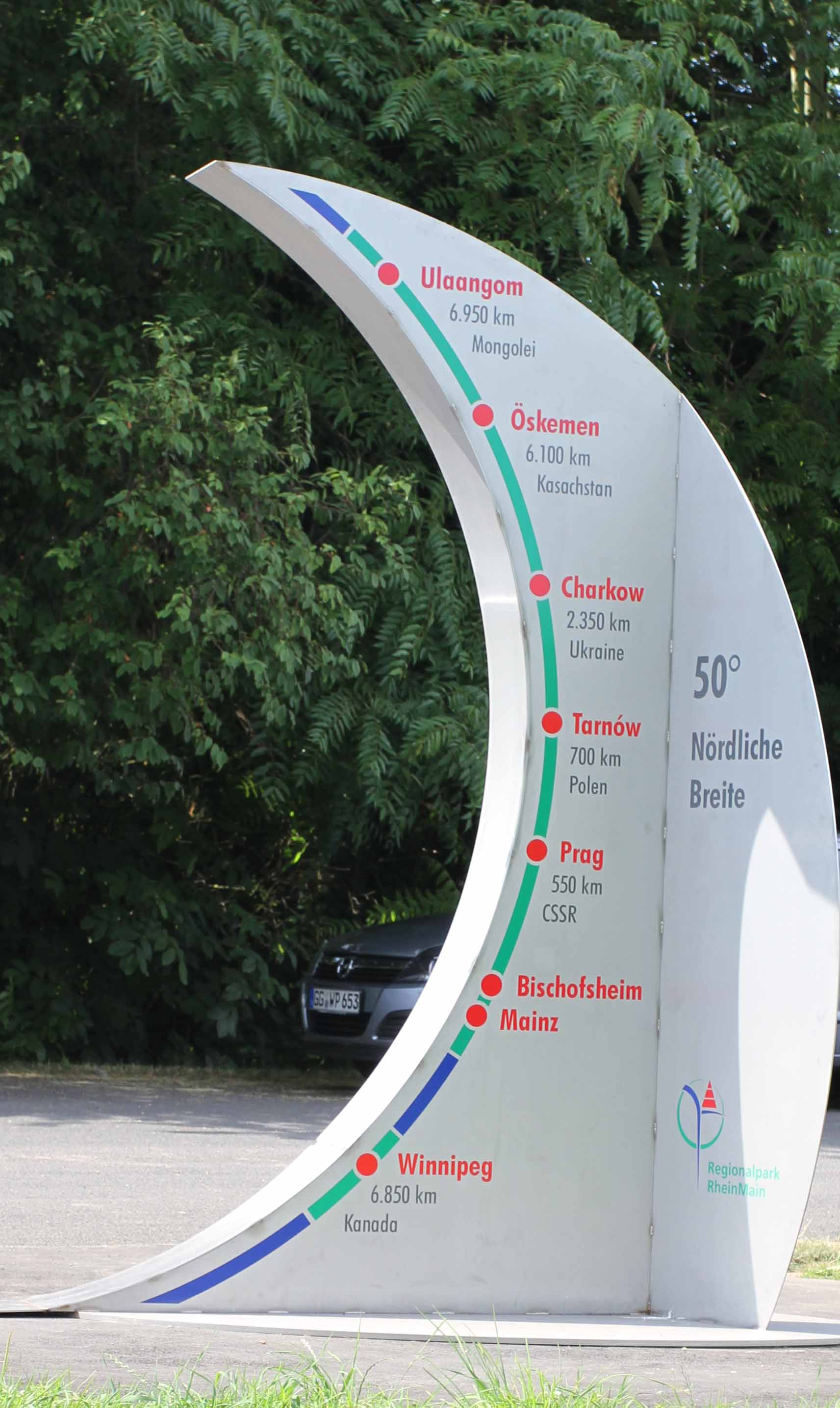
A sculpture at the Rhein-Main Regional Park in Germany showing Mainz and other cities around the world that lie along the 50th parallel north (distances not to scale)

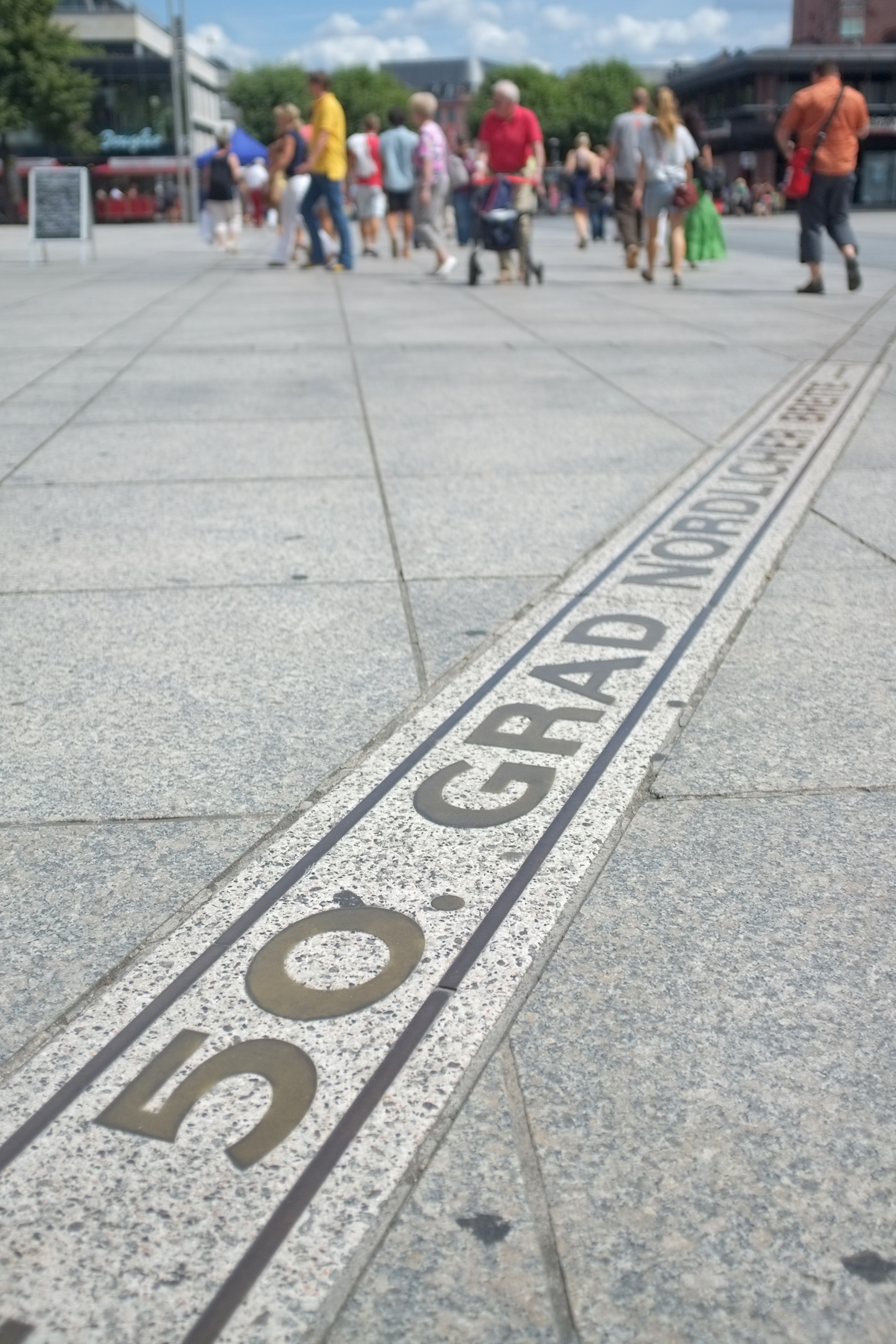
50th latitude mark in central Mainz, Germany

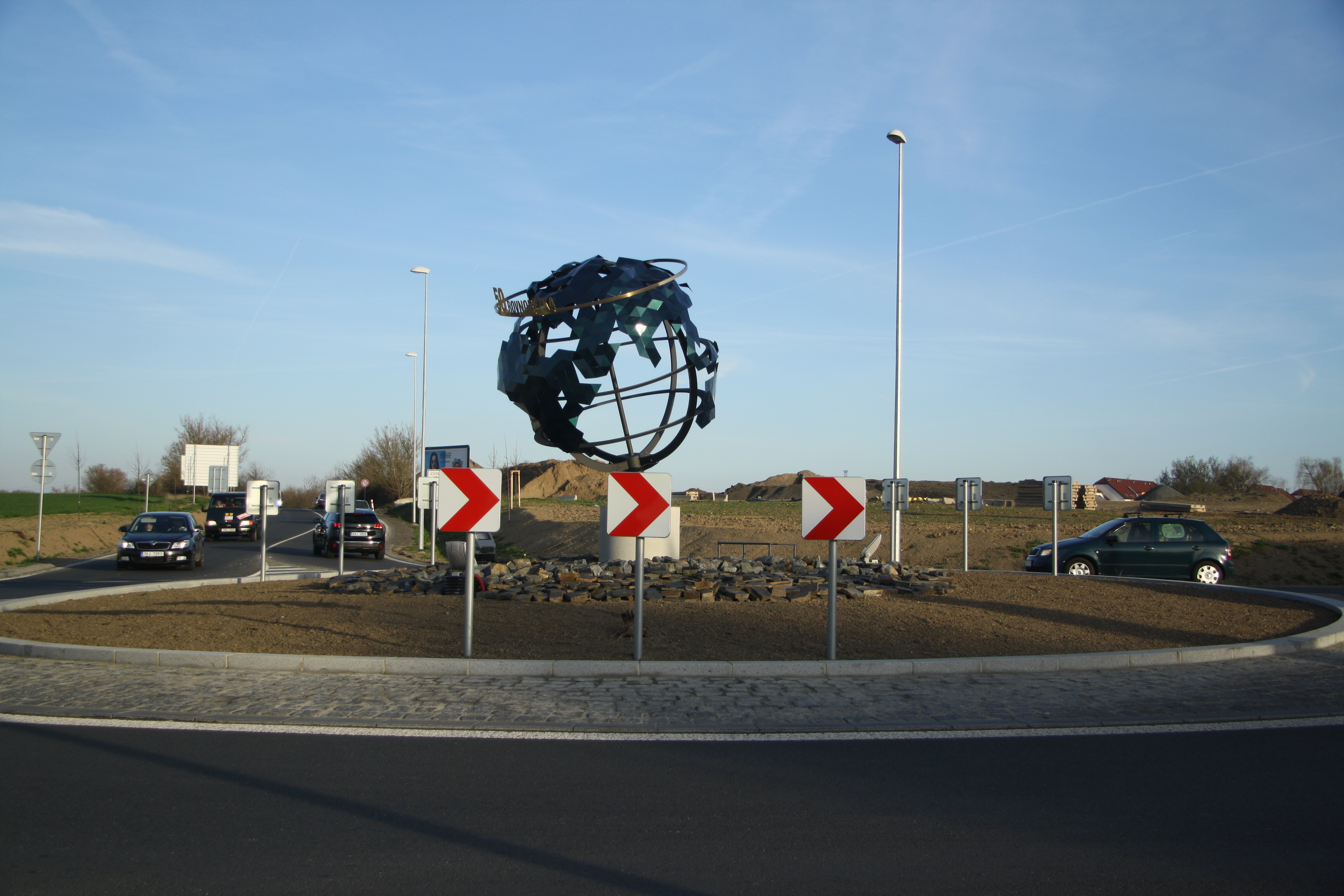
50th parallel roundabout monument in Libuš, Prague, Czech Republic

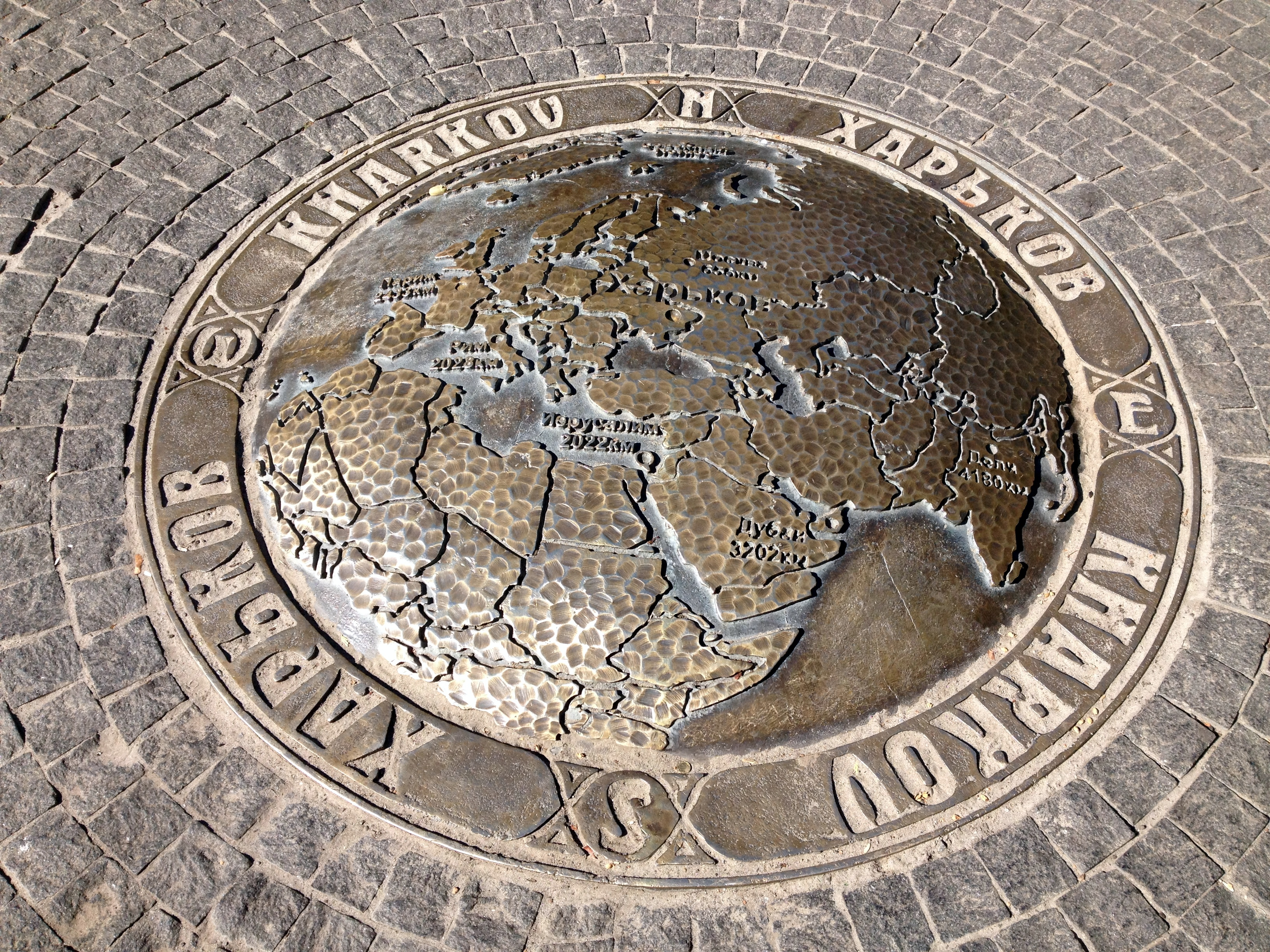
A plaque marking the 50th parallel north in Kharkiv, Ukraine

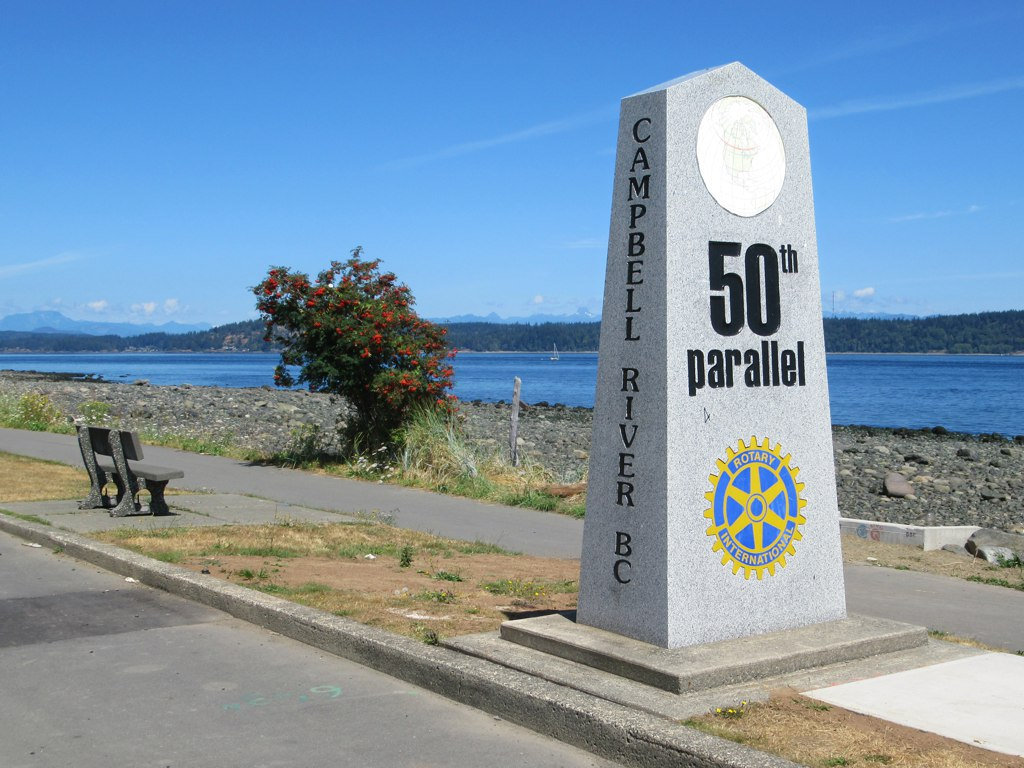
50th parallel marker next to the Old Island Highway in Campbell River, British Columbia, Canada

Starting at the Prime Meridian and heading eastwards, the parallel 50° north passes through:

Coordinates	Country, territory or sea	Notes
50°0′N 0°0′E	English Channel	
50°0′N 1°15′E	France	Upper Normandy — for about 20 km Picardy — passing just north of Amiens; Nord-Pas-de-Calais — for about 13 km
50°0′N 4°10′E	Belgium	Wallonia
50°0′N 4°40′E	France	Champagne-Ardenne — for about 10 km
50°0′N 4°49′E	Belgium	Wallonia
50°0′N 5°49′E	Luxembourg	Diekirch District
50°0′N 6°9′E	Germany	Rhineland-Palatinate; Hesse; Rhineland-Palatinate — passing through Mainz city centre Hesse — passing just south of Frankfurt, crossing a runway of FRA international airport and passing just south of DCF77 time signal transmitter Bavaria — passing just north of Bayreuth
50°0′N 12°26′E	Czech Republic	Passing through southern parts of Prague
50°0′N 17°49′E	Poland	For about 11 km
50°0′N 17°58′E	Czech Republic	For about 10 km
50°0′N 18°6′E	Poland	For about 5 km
50°0′N 18°10′E	Czech Republic	For about 1 km
50°0′N 18°11′E	Poland	Passing through Energylandia amusement park in Zator and southern districts of Kraków (on the 20th meridian east); Passing through southern districts of Tarnów (on the 21st meridian east); Passing through southern districts of Rzeszów (on the 22nd meridian east)
50°0′N 23°10′E	Ukraine	Lviv Oblast — passing just north of Lviv; Ternopil Oblast — passing through Pochaiv; Khmelnytskyi Oblast; Zhytomyr Oblast — passing through Andrushivka; Kyiv Oblast; Cherkasy Oblast; Poltava Oblast — passing through Lubny; Kharkiv Oblast — passing through Kharkiv city centre
50°0′N 37°57′E	Russia	Belgorod Oblast — for about 18 km
50°0′N 38°12′E	Ukraine	Luhansk Oblast — for about 12 km
50°0′N 38°22′E	Russia	Belgorod Oblast; Voronezh Oblast — passing just north of Boguchar; Rostov Oblast; Volgograd Oblast — passing just south of Kamyshin
50°0′N 47°15′E	Kazakhstan	West Kazakhstan Province — for about 63 km
50°0′N 48°8′E	Russia	Saratov Oblast — for about 55 km
50°0′N 48°51′E	Kazakhstan	West Kazakhstan Province — passing just south of Chapaev and Zhympity and just north of Karatobe; Aktobe Province — passing just north of Alga and Karabutak; Kostanay Province — passing just south of Arkalyk; Karagandy Province — passing just south of Temirtau and just north of Karaganda; East Kazakhstan Province — passing through the northern outskirts of Oskemen
50°0′N 85°2′E	Russia	Altai Republic; Tuva
50°0′N 89°58′E	Mongolia	Passing through the southern tip of Uvs Lake
50°0′N 95°1′E	Russia	Tuva
50°0′N 95°45′E	Mongolia	For about 11 km
50°0′N 95°55′E	Russia	Tuva — for about 7 km
50°0′N 96°2′E	Mongolia	For about 11 km
50°0′N 96°10′E	Russia	Tuva
50°0′N 97°55′E	Mongolia	
50°0′N 107°13′E	Russia	Buryatia — for about 5 km
50°0′N 107°18′E	Mongolia	For about 3 km
50°0′N 107°20′E	Russia	Buryatia; Zabaykalsky Krai
50°0′N 113°34′E	Mongolia	
50°0′N 115°12′E	Russia	Zabaykalsky Krai
50°0′N 116°1′E	Mongolia	
50°0′N 116°20′E	Russia	Zabaykalsky Krai
50°0′N 119°6′E	China	Inner Mongolia; Heilongjiang
50°0′N 127°29′E	Russia	Amur Oblast; Khabarovsk Krai
50°0′N 140°30′E	Strait of Tartary	
50°0′N 142°9′E	Russia	Sakhalin Oblast — island of Sakhalin
50°0′N 143°59′E	Sea of Okhotsk	
50°0′N 155°23′E	Russia	Sakhalin Oblast — island of Paramushir
50°0′N 155°24′E	Pacific Ocean	
50°0′N 127°19′W	Canada	British Columbia — Vancouver Island (passing through the city of Campbell River) and mainland, also through the Okanagan Valley immediately north of Kelowna. Alberta — passing through the city of Medicine Hat; Saskatchewan it passes a few km south of the cities of Swift Current, Moose Jaw and the capital, Regina; Manitoba — passing just north of Winnipeg; Ontario — passing through Lake Nipigon; Quebec – passing through the town of Port-Cartier
50°0′N 66°54′W	Gulf of Saint Lawrence	Passing just north of Anticosti Island, Quebec, Canada
50°0′N 57°45′W	Canada	Newfoundland and Labrador — island of Newfoundland
50°0′N 56°46′W	White Bay	
50°0′N 56°21′W	Canada	Newfoundland and Labrador — island of Newfoundland
50°0′N 55°52′W	Atlantic Ocean	Confusion Bay
50°0′N 55°33′W	Canada	Newfoundland and Labrador — island of Newfoundland
50°0′N 55°31′W	Atlantic Ocean	Passing just north of the Isles of Scilly, England, United Kingdom
50°0′N 5°16′W	United Kingdom	England — Lizard Peninsula, Cornwall, for about 7 km
50°0′N 5°10′W	English Channel	

=== Sakhalin island ===
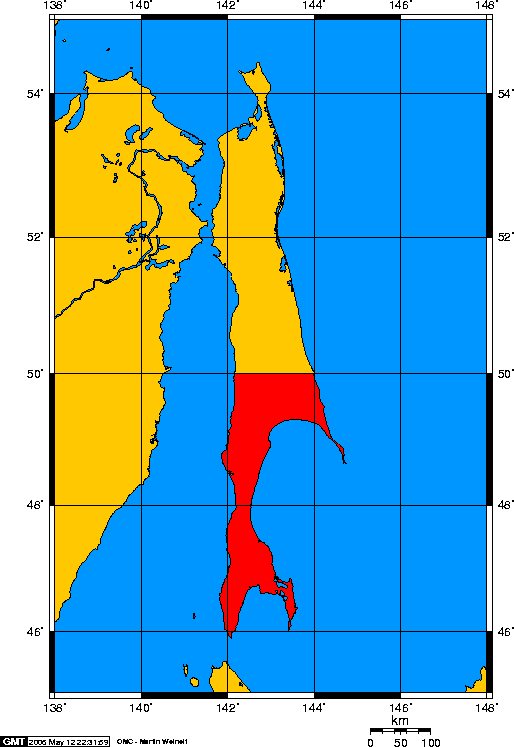
Sakhalin island between 1905 and 1945. The area south of the 50th parallel line was under Japanese control

From the signing of the 1875 Treaty of Saint Petersburg until the Russo-Japanese War which broke in 1904, the Russian Empire had full control of Sakhalin island. As a result of the 1905 Treaty of Portsmouth that brought an end to the Russo-Japanese War, the portion of the island south of the 50th parallel line became Japanese territory, part of Karafuto Prefecture. However, following the month long Soviet–Japanese War during the summer of 1945, the entire island was reunified under Soviet control.

== See also ==
- Circles of latitude between the 40th parallel north and the 45th parallel north
- Circles of latitude between the 50th parallel north and the 55th parallel north
- 49th Parallel, 1941 Canadian and British film
- Hymns of the 49th Parallel, 2004 album by k.d. lang
- Boundary Lake (Manitoba/North Dakota)
- Northwest Angle (northern Lake of the Woods County)
- Oregon boundary dispute
- Pig War, 1859
- War of 1812
- Weißwurstäquator
