= Berlin Conference =

1884–85 European meeting on colonisation in Africa

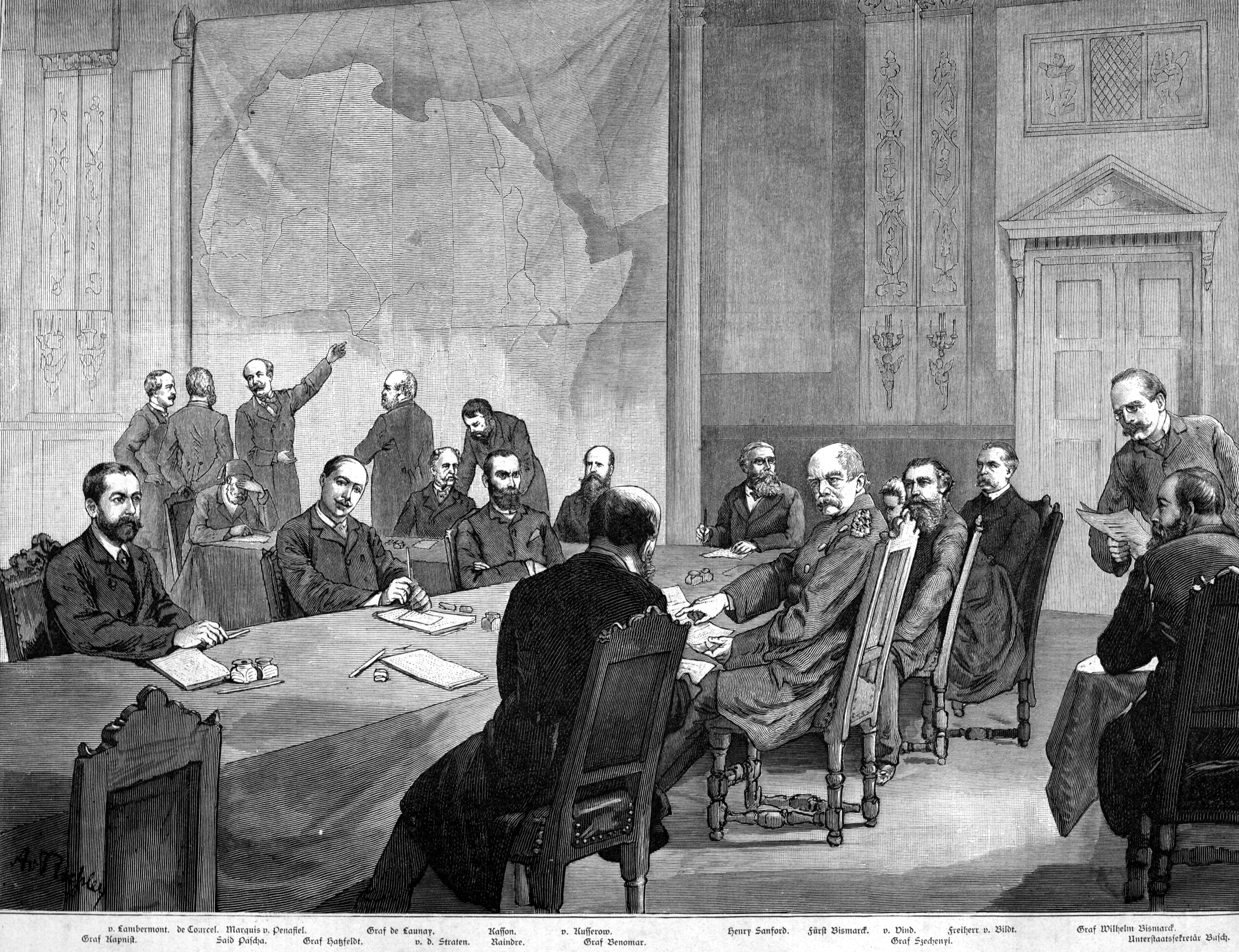
The conference of Berlin, as illustrated in Illustrirte Zeitung

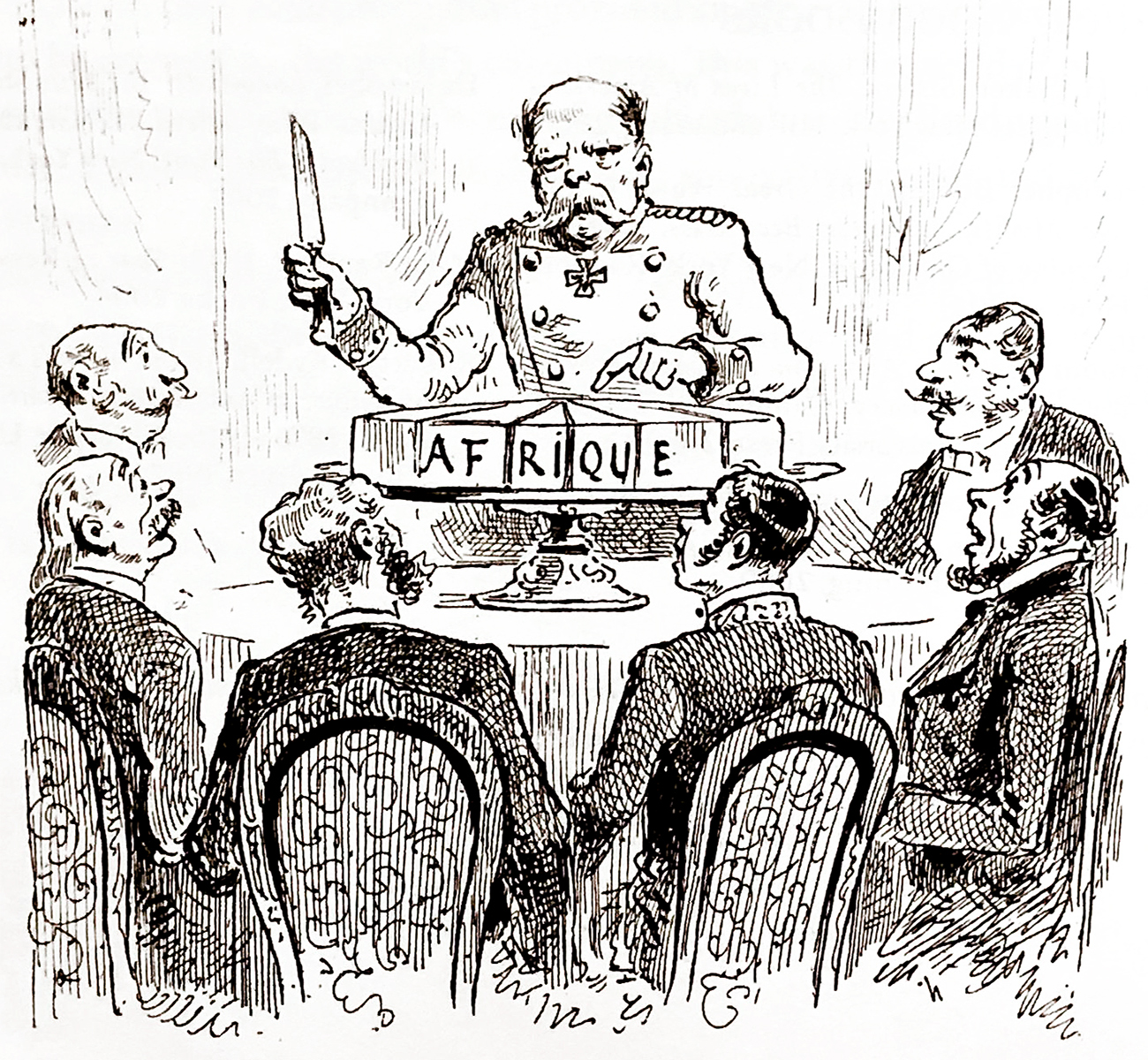
Press cartoon published in L'Illustration on 3 January 1885, showing German Chancellor Bismarck about to partition Africa

The Berlin Conference of 1884–1885 was a meeting of colonial powers that concluded with the signing of the General Act of Berlin, an agreement regulating European colonisation and trade in Africa during the New Imperialism period. The conference of fourteen countries was organised by Otto von Bismarck, the first chancellor of Germany, at the request of Leopold II of Belgium at a building (No. 77, now No. 92) on Berlin's central Wilhelmstrasse. It met on 15 November 1884 and, after an adjournment, concluded on 26 February 1885 with the signing of the General Act. During the conference, attendees also discussed other related issues and agreed on a common framework for the recognition of European ''effective occupation'' of African coastal territory elsewhere on the continent. After the conference, European claims on African territory increased with international legal recognition, having a newly established legal framework for establishing colonies.

The General Act of Berlin can be seen as formalizing the ongoing Scramble for Africa. The conference contributed to ushering in a period of heightened colonial activity by European powers, and is sometimes cited as being responsible for the "carve-up of Africa." However, some scholars warn against overstating its role in the colonial partitioning of Africa, drawing attention to the many bilateral agreements concluded before and after the conference. A 2024 study found that the only borders set at the conference were those of the Congo region (which were subsequently revised), and that most of Africa's borders did not take their final form until over two decades later. U.S. historians Wm. Roger Louis and Prosser Gifford conceded, however, that "the Berlin Act did have a relevance to the course of the partition" of Africa.

European powers were also driven by economic motivations, as competition for the vast natural resources on the continent were crucial for industrialisation and expansion. As European industries grew, the raw materials such as rubber, minerals, ivory, and cotton made Africa highly valuable. Control over Africa's vast markets enabled European powers to sell manufactured goods, reinforcing their economic dominance in both resources and trade. The Berlin Conference (1884–1885) formalised these ambitions by recognising territorial claims in resource-rich areas and establishing regulations to reduce conflict among competing colonial powers. Economic rivalries, particularly between Britain and France, heightened the urgency to secure colonies before monopolies could be established in strategic regions such as the Congo Basin. The industrial surplus in Europe further encouraged expansion, as African colonies provided both raw materials for European industries and ready markets for European manufactured products.

Six of the fourteen countries represented–Austria-Hungary, Russia, Denmark, the Netherlands, Sweden-Norway, and the United States–came home without having secured any zones of interest in Africa.

== Background ==
Prior to the conference, European diplomats had already begun to interact with African rulers, establishing connections to continental trade networks. In the early 19th century, the European demand for ivory, which was then often used in the production of luxury goods, led many European merchants into the interior markets of Africa. European spheres of power and influence were limited to coastal Africa at this time as Europeans had only established trading posts (protected by gunboats).

In 1876, King Leopold II of Belgium, who had founded and controlled the International African Association the same year, invited Henry Morton Stanley to join him in researching and "civilising" the continent. In 1878, the International Congo Society was also formed, with more economic goals but still closely related to the former society. Leopold secretly bought off the foreign investors in the Congo Society, which was turned to imperialistic goals, with the "African Society" serving primarily as a philanthropic front.

Explorers and missionaries played a significant role in laying the groundwork for the Berlin Conference (1884–1885). They mapped large parts of the continent, negotiated treaties with local leaders, and promoted narratives that justified European expansion. Notably, Henry Morton Stanley, conducted expeditions into the Congo Basin on behalf of King Leopold II, securing treaties that later enabled Belgium to claim sovereignty over the region. Missionaries similarly advanced European influence by seeking to spread Christianity and Western cultural values, often aligning their religious activities with the objectives of colonial expansion. For example, Christian missionary David Livingstone called for a worldwide crusade to defeat the Arab-controlled slave trade and "liberate Africa" by the introduction of "commerce, Christianity" and civilisation. Mission stations frequently served as early outposts of European presence, combining religious instruction with political functions. Reports from both explorers and missionaries depicted Africa as a land of economic potential and as a target for what was termed the “civilising mission.”

From 1878 to 1885, Stanley returned to the Congo not as a reporter but as Leopold's agent, with the secret mission to organise what would become known as the Congo Free State soon after the closure of the Berlin Conference in August 1885. French agents discovered Leopold's plans, and in response France sent its own explorers to Africa. In 1881, French naval officer Pierre de Brazza was dispatched to central Africa, travelled into the western Congo basin, and raised the French flag over the newly founded Brazzaville in what is now the Republic of Congo. Finally, Portugal, which had essentially abandoned a colonial empire in the area, long held through the mostly defunct proxy Kingdom of Kongo, also claimed the area, based on old treaties with Restoration-era Spain and the Catholic Church. It quickly made a treaty on 26 February 1884 with its old ally, Great Britain, to block off the Congo Society's access to the Atlantic.

By the early 1880s, factors including diplomatic successes, improving European knowledge of local structures, and the demand for resources such as gold, timber, and rubber, triggered dramatically increased European involvement in the continent of Africa. Stanley's charting of the Congo River Basin (1874–1877) removed the last terra incognita from European maps of the continent, delineating the areas of British, Portuguese, French and Belgian control. These European nations raced to annex territory that might be claimed by rivals.

France moved to take over Tunisia, one of the last of the Barbary states, using a claim of another piracy incident. French claims by Pierre de Brazza were quickly acted on by the French military, which took control of what is now the Republic of the Congo in 1881 and Guinea in 1884. Italy became part of the Triple Alliance, an event that upset Bismarck's carefully laid plans and led Germany to join the European invasion of Africa.

In 1882, realising the geopolitical extent of Portuguese control on the coasts, but seeing penetration by France eastward across Central Africa toward Ethiopia, the Nile, and the Suez Canal, Britain saw its vital trade route through Egypt to India threatened. Because of the collapsed Egyptian financing and a subsequent mutiny in which hundreds of British subjects were murdered or injured, Britain intervened in the nominally Ottoman Khedivate of Egypt, which it controlled for decades.

== Conference ==
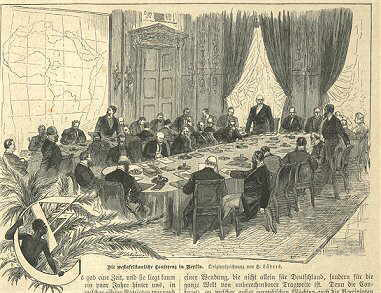
The conference of Berlin, as illustrated in German newspaper Die Gartenlaube

The European race for colonies made Germany start launching expeditions of its own, which frightened both British and French statesmen. Hoping to quickly soothe the brewing conflict, Belgian King Leopold II convinced France and Germany that common trade in Africa was in the best interests of all three countries. Under support from the British and the initiative of Portugal, Otto von Bismarck, the Chancellor of Germany, called on representatives of 13 European nations, as well as the United States, to take part in the Berlin Conference in 1884 to work out a joint policy on the African continent.

No African countries were invited to the congress, but Sultan Barghash Bin Seyyid of Zanzibar had requested to send a representative to the conference, the only African head of state to do so, which was rejected due to pressure by the Anti-Slavery reporter, an organization in Britain which had pressured the government to reject the participation of Zanzibar at the conference due to its activity in the slave trade.

The conference opened on 15 November 1884 and closed on 26 February 1885. The number of plenipotentiaries (representative diplomats) varied per nation, but these 14 countries sent representatives to attend the Berlin Conference and sign the subsequent Berlin Act:

State	Colonial empire	Plenipotentiaries
Germany	German colonial empire	Otto von Bismarck; Paul von Hatzfeldt; Clemens Busch; Heinrich von Kusserow
Austria-Hungary	Austrian colonial empire	Imre Széchényi von Sárvár-Felsővidék
(Congo Free State) International Congo Society	International Congo Society	Gabriel August van der Straten-Ponthoz; Auguste, Baron Lambermont
Spain	Spanish colonial empire	Francisco Merry y Colom, 1st Count of Benomar
Denmark	Danish colonial empire	Emil Vind
United States	U.S colonial empire	John A. Kasson; Henry S. Sanford; Henry Morton Stanley (as Technical Adviser)
France	French colonial empire	Alphonse de Courcel
United Kingdom	British Empire	Edward Baldwin Malet
Italy	Italian Empire	Edoardo de Launay
Netherlands	Dutch Empire	Philip van der Hoeven
Portugal	Portuguese Empire	Antônio José da Serra Gomes; António de Serpa Pimentel
Russia	Russian Empire	Pyotr Kapnist
Sweden–Norway	Swedish colonial empire	Gillis Bildt
Ottoman Empire	Ottoman Empire	Mehmed Said Pasha

No matter their number of plenipotentiaries or their presence in the region, each country possessed a single vote for formal resolutions. Uniquely, the United States reserved the right to decline or to accept the conclusions of the conference.

== General Act ==
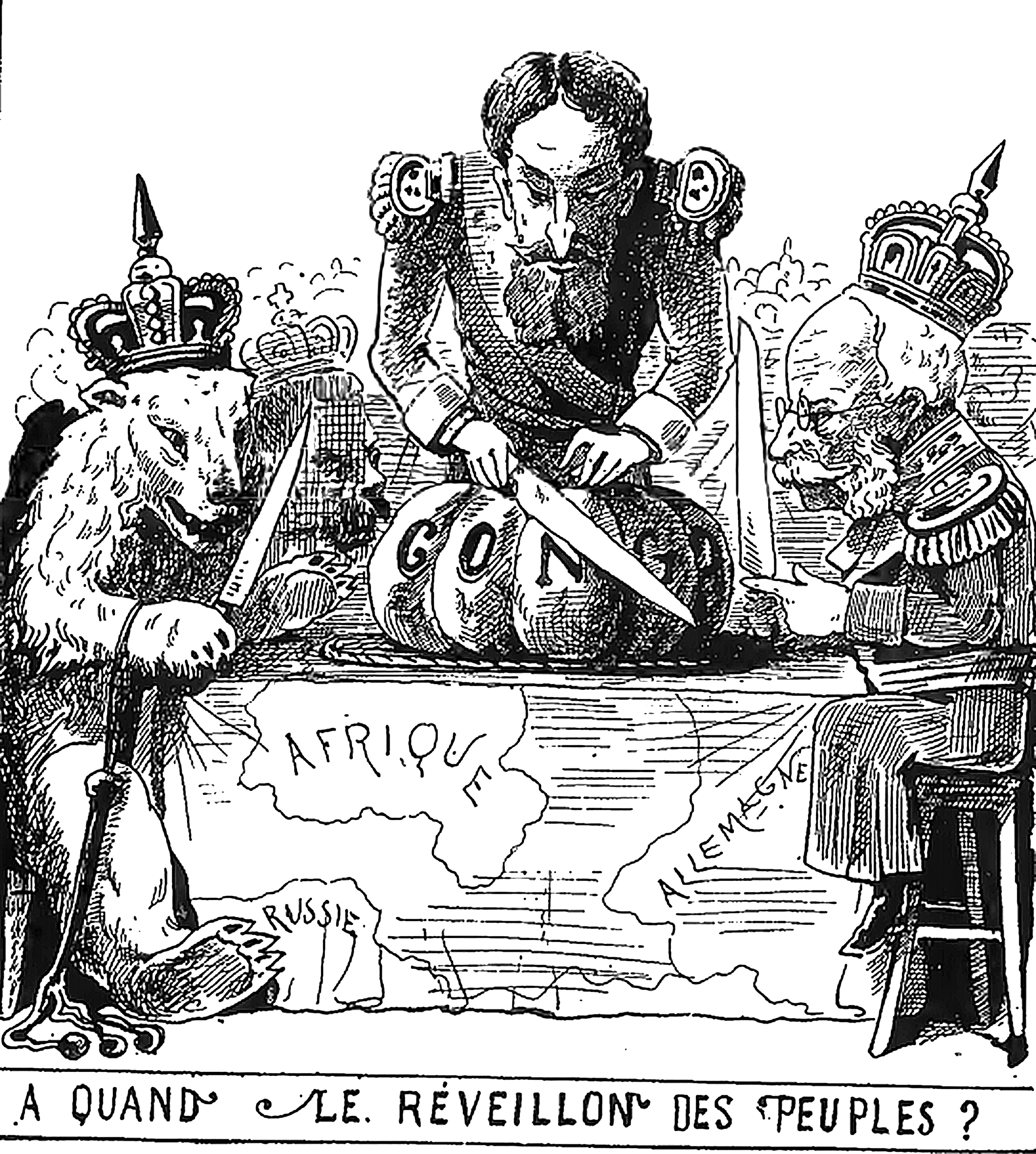
Cartoon depicting Leopold II sharing the Congo

One of the major outcomes of the General Act was that the properties occupied by Belgian King Leopold's International Congo Society were confirmed as belonging to the Society. On 1 August 1885, just months after the closure of the Berlin Conference, Leopold's Vice-Administrator General in the Congo, Francis de Winton, announced that the territory was henceforth called "the Congo Free State," a name that was not in use at the time of the conference and does not appear in the General Act. The Belgian official Law Gazette later stated that from 1 August 1885 onwards, Leopold II was to be considered Sovereign of the new state, even though this determination was not made at the Berlin Conference.

Partly to gain public acceptance, the conference resolved to end slavery by African and Islamic powers. Article 6 of the General Act proclaimed that all European powers within the continent should oversee the indigenous peoples, including "[striving] for the suppression of slavery." Thus, an international prohibition of the slave trade throughout their respected spheres was signed by the European members. In his novella Heart of Darkness, Joseph Conrad sarcastically referred to one of the participants at the conference, the International Association of the Congo (also called "International Congo Society"), as "the International Society for the Suppression of Savage Customs."

The General Act of the Berlin Conference also decreed that the 14 signatory powers would have free trade throughout the Congo Basin. For the purposes of the Act, the borders of the Congo Basin were defined based on surrounding geographical features, comprising the Niari, Ogooué, Chari, and Nile basins to the North, the watershed of Lake Tanganyika to the East, and by the basins of the Zambezi and Loge to the South. The Niger and Congo rivers were also made free for ship traffic.

Another outcome of the General Act was the codification of the Principle of Effective Occupation (see below), which mandated that "authority had to be established throughout the respective territory" in order for a colonial claim to be legitimised. As a result, any power attempting to take possession of or assume a protectorate over any territory within the African continent would be required to notify the other signatory powers before the possession or colony could be officially recognised.

American journalist Daniel De Leon described the conference as "an event unique in the history of political science…Diplomatic in form, it was economic in fact."

== Principle of effective occupation ==
The principle of effective occupation stated that a power could acquire rights over colonial lands only if it possessed them or had effective occupation: if it had treaties with local leaders, flew its flag there, and established an administration in the territory to govern it with a police force to keep order. The colonial power could also make use of the colony economically. That principle became important not only as a basis for the European powers to acquire territorial sovereignty in Africa but also for delimiting their respective overseas possessions, as effective occupation served in some instances as a criterion for settling colonial boundary disputes. However, as the scope of the Berlin Act was limited to the lands that fronted on the African coast, European powers in numerous instances later claimed rights over interior lands without demonstrating the requirement of effective occupation, as articulated in Article 35 of the Final Act.

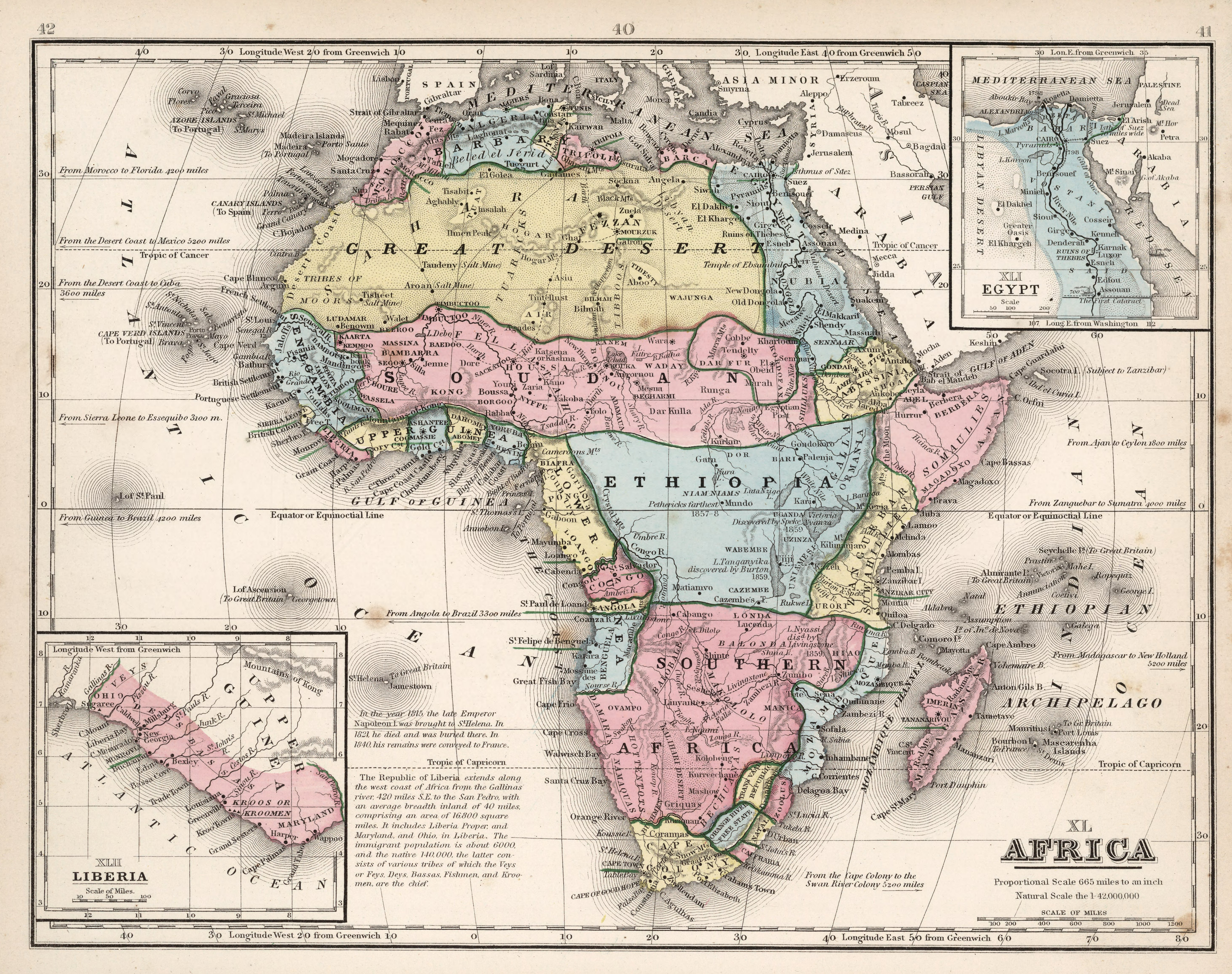
Map of Africa in 1865, before the Berlin Conference established principles governing European territorial claims in Africa.

At the Berlin Conference (1884–1885), the interpretation of the Principle of Effective Occupation was a major point of contention, particularly between Germany, Britain, and France. At stake was the British distinction between territorial annexations and protectorates. Germany, as a relatively new colonial power in Africa, joined France in arguing that no state should hold legal rights to any territory unless it exercised strong and continuous political authority there. British delegates, by contrast, reserved the right to control its large territorial holdings without directly governing them. Domestically, Britain's constitution prevented direct governance without the official annexation of territory, and the British government worried that the precedent of treating African protectorates as fully-governed annexations would have costly consequences for its empire worldwide. In its foreign policy, Britain viewed Germany as a latecomer to African colonisation and assumed it was unlikely to acquire extensive territories beyond its initial claims—claims that were nonetheless proving to be more valuable than many British possessions. That logic caused it to be generally assumed by Britain and France that Germany had an interest in embarrassing the other European powers on the continent and forcing them to give up their possessions if they could not muster a strong political presence. In the end, the British view prevailed.

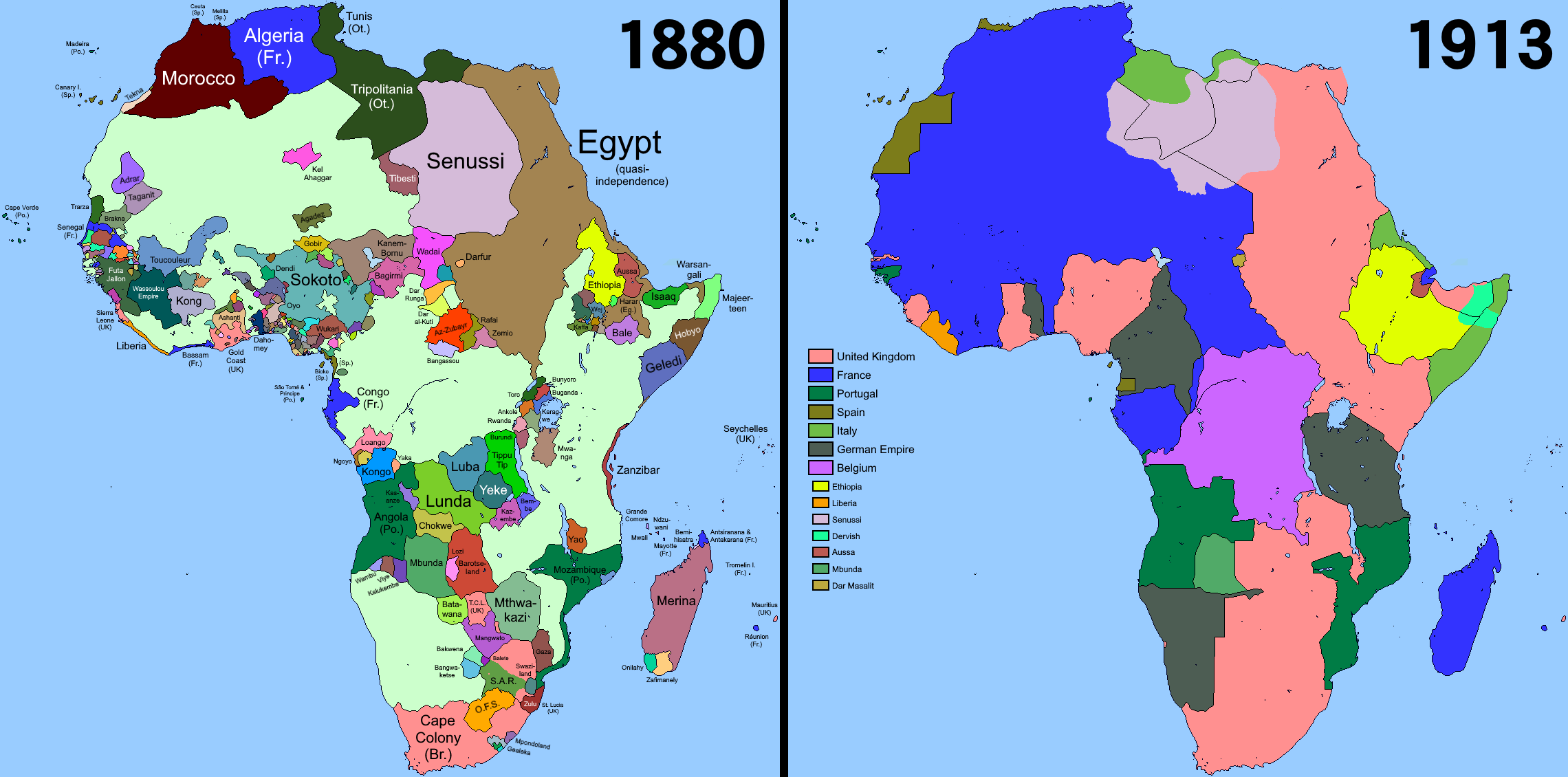
Comparison of Africa in the years 1880 and 1913

The reluctance of European powers to exercise direct control over their African territories is evident in the protocols of the Berlin Conference, particularly regarding the Principle of Effective Occupation. To reconcile differing positions—especially between Germany and Britain—the powers ultimately agreed that effective occupation could be established by a European state setting up a coastal base, from which it could expand into the interior. The conference participants did not view the rules of occupation as requiring full European hegemony on the ground. Belgium had initially proposed that effective occupation should include obligations to "cause peace to be administered," but this provision was removed from the final document due to opposition from Britain and France.

That principle, along with others that were written at the conference, allowed the Europeans to conquer Africa but to do as little as possible to administer or control it. To meet that minimum standard, empires frequently invested in telegraph lines as cheap and scalable territorial markers. State-sponsored telegraph infrastructure also enabled long-distance communication, and thus management, of a colony by the imperial metropole.

Article 35 did not fully apply to the hinterlands of Africa at the time of the conference. Article 34 permitted empires to claim inland territories so long as they first demonstrated their occupation of an adjacent coast. This gave rise to conflicting interpretations of a "Hinterland Doctrine" due to the unsettled questions of how empires could draw their boundaries and how far inland their claims could reach from the coast. The uneven shape of the African continent did not provide neat solutions, and without a legal definition of the term "hinterland", confusion over Article 34 required empires to negotiate over every disputed hinterland claim, a process which usually favored the militarily or economically strongest claimant.

== Agenda ==
- Portugal–Britain: The Portuguese government presented a project, known as the "Pink Map," or the "Rose-Coloured Map," in which the colonies of Angola and Mozambique were united by co-option of the intervening territory (the land later became Zambia, Zimbabwe, and Malawi). All of the countries attending the conference, except for Britain, endorsed Portugal's ambitions. Just over five years later, in 1890, the British government issued an ultimatum that demanded the Portuguese withdraw from the disputed area.
- France–Britain: A line running from Say in Niger to Maroua, on the northeastern coast of Lake Chad, determined which part belonged to whom. France would own territory to the north of the line, and Britain would own territory to the south of it. The basin of the Nile would be British, with the French taking the basin of Lake Chad. Furthermore, between the 11th and 15th degrees north in latitude, the border would pass between Ouaddaï, which would be French, and Darfur in Sudan, which would be British. In reality, a no man's land 200 km wide was put in place between the 21st and 23rd meridians east.
- France–Germany: The area to the north of a line, formed by the intersection of the 14th meridian east and Miltou, was designated to be French, and the area to the south would be German, later called German Cameroon.
- Britain–Germany: The separation came in the form of a line passing through Yola, on the Benue, Dekoa, going up to the extremity of Lake Chad.
- France–Italy: Italy was to own what lies north of a line from the intersection of the Tropic of Cancer and the 17th meridian east to the intersection of the 15th parallel north and the 21st meridian east.

== Aftermath ==
European claims in Africa, 1913. Today's boundaries, which are largely a legacy of the colonial era, are shown. Belgium Germany Spain France Great Britain Italy Portugal Independent (Liberia and Ethiopia)

The Berlin Conference offered European powers a framework to redirect their rivalries outward, allowing them to expand into new territories while addressing growing interests from the United States, Russia, and Japan. It also provided a platform for constructive dialogue aimed at limiting future conflicts among European states. As a result, colonial rule was established across nearly the entire African continent. Following World War II, when African nations gained independence, they did so as fragmented states, reflecting the arbitrary boundaries and divisions imposed during the colonial period.

Despite the far-reaching consequences of the Berlin Conference, no African rulers were invited to participate. European powers divided the continent based solely on their economic and political interests, disregarding existing borders and the will of the local populations. Pre-existing power structures were largely ignored, and arbitrary boundaries were imposed, which later contributed to long-term political instability and economic challenges in the newly formed African states.

The Scramble for Africa intensified as a result of the General Act of the Berlin Conference, and especially the principle of effective occupation. In central Africa in particular, expeditions were dispatched to coerce traditional rulers into signing treaties, using force if necessary. Bedouin- and Berber-ruled states in the Sahara and the Sahel were overrun by the French in several wars by the beginning of World War I. The British moved up from South Africa and down from Egypt and conquered states such as the Mahdist State and the Sultanate of Zanzibar and, having already defeated the Zulu Kingdom in South Africa in 1879, moved on to annex the independent Boer republics of Transvaal and the Orange Free State.

Within a few years, Africa was at least nominally divided south of the Sahara. By 1895, the only independent states were:

- Morocco, involved in colonial conflicts with Spain and France, which conquered the nation in the early 20th century. Morocco was subsequently a French protectorate from 1912-1956.
- Liberia, founded with the support of the United States for freed slaves to return to Africa.
- Ethiopian Empire, which fended off Italian invasion from Eritrea in the First Italo-Ethiopian War of 1895–1896 but fell to Italian occupation in 1936 as a result of defeat in the Second Italo-Ethiopian War.
- Majeerteen Sultanate, a Somali kingdom founded in the early 18th century which remained independent until it was annexed by Italy in the 20th century.
- Sultanate of Hobyo, carved out of the former Majeerteen Sultanate, which ruled northern Somalia until the 20th century, when it was incorporated into Italian Somaliland.
- The Ogaden/Haud, a historically contested territory inhabited mainly by Somali clans, which experienced conflicts with the Ethiopian Empire but was not formally colonised by any colonial power.
  - Dervish movement (Somali), a Somali Islamic nationalist movement founded by Muḥammad ibn 'Abdallāh Hassan in 1899, which resisted British, Italian, and Ethiopian colonial forces until its defeat in 1920.

The following states, while independent as of 1895, were annexed by the British Empire roughly a decade after the Berlin Conference:

- Orange Free State, a Boer republic founded by Dutch settlers.
- South African Republic (Transvaal), also a Boer republic

By 1914, 90% of all the land that makes up Africa was under European control.

- Most of the Sahara was French, but after the quelling of the Mahdi rebellion, the end of the Fashoda crisis, and the Voulet–Chanoine Mission, the Sudan remained firmly under joint British–Egyptian rulership, with Egypt being under British occupation before becoming a British protectorate in 1914.
- The Boer republics were conquered by the British in the Second Boer War from 1899 to 1902. Libya was conquered by Italy in 1911, and Morocco was divided between the French and Spanish in 1912.
- By 1914, the only modern nations on the continent of Africa that remained independent were Ethiopia and Liberia.

== Historical analysis ==
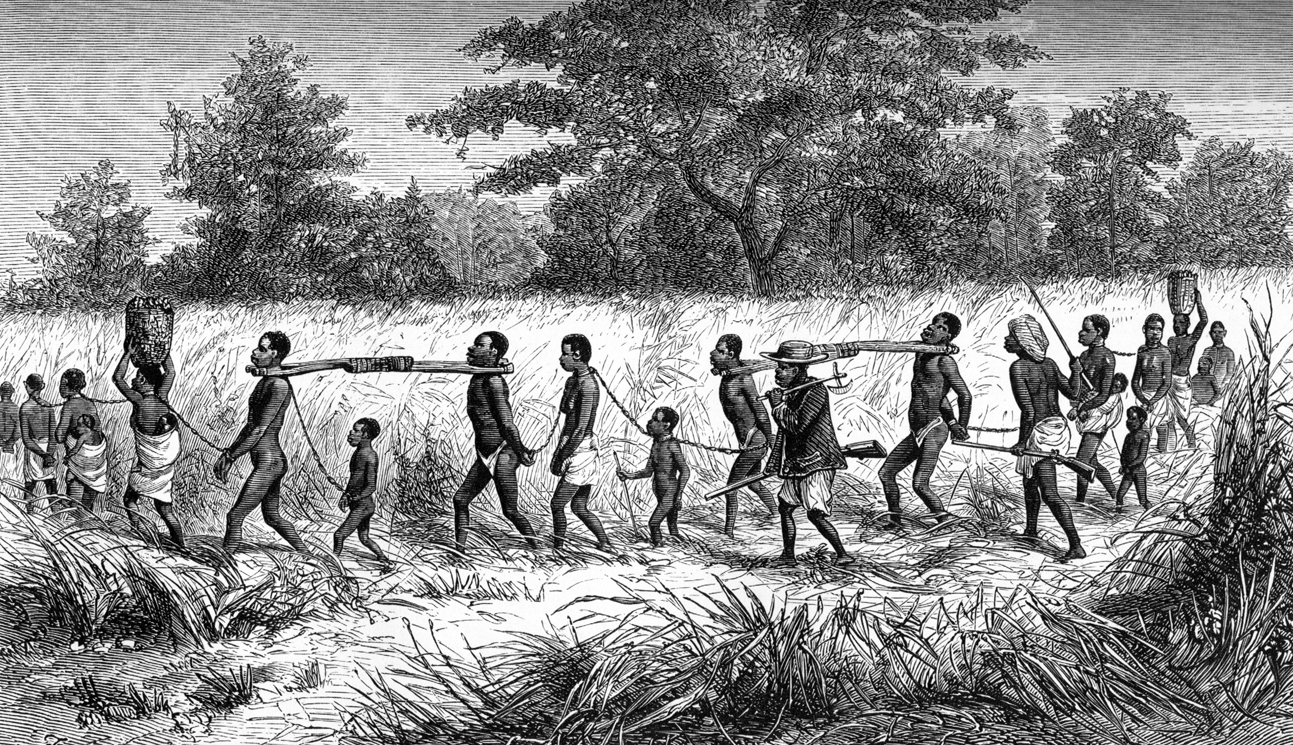
Slave traders and their captives bound in chains and collared with 'taming sticks'. From Livingstone's Narrative

Historians have long marked the Berlin Conference as the formalisation of the Scramble for Africa. However, scholars have debated the lasting legal and economic impacts of the conference on the colonisation of Africa. Aside from the recognition of what would shortly thereafter become the Congo Free State, the General Act did not establish any new colonies for the signatory powers. Regardless, its significance for colonialism and the Scramble for Africa overall was that it established a process for the powers in attendance to found colonies that would be legally recognised.

Other historians focus on the legal implications in international law and argue that the conference was only one of many (mostly bilateral) agreements between prospective colonists, which took place after the conference. Historians such as Sybil Crowe, Matthew Craven, and Simon Katzenellenbogen have sought to present a more nuanced view of the Berlin Conference. They caution against over-emphasising its role in the colonial partitioning of Africa, instead highlighting pre- and post-conference bilateral agreements between European powers.

However, critics of the approach advanced by Crowe, Craven, and Katzenellenbogen warn that international agreements predating the Berlin Conference may not be as significant as they seem, as many were not fully implemented or enforced. Indeed, many of the nations that participated in the Conference ultimately ignored requirements set forth within the General Act, disregarding regulations for the establishment of satellite governments, rights to the land, and trade.

Historians also dispute whether the Berlin Conference had significant implications for the nature of sovereignty in international law. The historian Steven Press argues that in granting diplomatic recognition to the Congo, the Conference (briefly) legitimized the idea that political sovereignty was something that could be bought and sold, whether to European states or to wealthy individuals. Press traces this legal novelty to the purchase of Sarawak by James Brooke, and its 1863 recognition of statehood by Britain. Although European authorities began to disown their acceptance of this "Borneo precedent" by the 1890s, demands for diplomatic recognition by individuals and charter companies imitating Brooke's example quickly increased in the years following the Conference.

The process by which European nations colonised territories in Africa (as established by the Berlin Conference) ignored factors including ethnic, linguistic, and cultural divides while creating new colony or protectorate borders. Rather, many of these colonies and the modern states of Africa today were created based solely on geological features, available resources, and convenience. Africans have been the individuals most negatively impacted by the effects of the Berlin Conference and the larger Scramble for Africa. One 1885 entry of a Nigerian newspaper, the Lagos Observer, described the Conference as a "robbery on so large a scale" that completely failed to consider the welfare of native Africans in its proceedings.

As a result, countless indigenous Africans were displaced. Moreover, the resulting states experienced enduring consequences including economic instability as well as political and inter-ethnic conflict. Examples include the Rwandan Genocide of 1994. Rwanda represents a great example of the lasting impacts of ethnic partitioning as the major national ethnic groups, the Tutsi and the Hutu, were pitted against one another by Belgian colonisers. Therefore, what may outwardly appear solely as ethnic violence is also a politically motivated genocide tied to Rwanda's colonial history.

Rwanda is not the only example. Across the continent of Africa, colonial borders halted the previously existing exchange of languages, histories, ideas, and goods. For instance, the nomadic pastoralist Maasai people were divided by the border that separates modern Kenya and Tanzania a result of European colonisation.

== See also ==
- Brussels Anti-Slavery Conference 1889–90
- Impact of Western European colonialism and colonisation

== Sources ==
- Chamberlain, Muriel E. (2014). The Scramble for Africa. London: Longman, 1974, 4th edn. ISBN 0-582-36881-2.
- Craven, M. 2015. "Between law and history: the Berlin Conference of 1884–1885 and the logic of free trade." London Review of International Law 3, 31–59.
- Crowe, Sybil E. (1942). The Berlin West African Conference, 1884–1885. New York: Longmans, Green. ISBN 0-8371-3287-8 (1981, New ed. edition).
- Förster, Stig, Wolfgang Justin Mommsen, and Ronald Edward Robinson, eds. Bismarck, Europe and Africa: The Berlin Africa conference 1884–1885 and the onset of partition (Oxford University Press, 1988) online; 30 topical chapters by experts.
- Hochschild, Adam (1999). King Leopold's Ghost. ISBN 0-395-75924-2.
- Katzenellenbogen, S. 1996. It didn't happen at Berlin: Politics, economics and ignorance in the setting of Africa's colonial boundaries. In Nugent, P. and Asiwaju, A. I. (Eds.), African boundaries: Barriers, conduits and opportunities. pp. 21–34. London: Pinter.
- Petringa, Maria (2006). Brazza, A Life for Africa. ISBN 978-1-4259-1198-0.
- Lorin, Amaury, and de Gemeaux, Christine, eds., L'Europe coloniale et le grand tournant de la Conférence de Berlin (1884–1885), Paris, Le Manuscrit, coll. "Carrefours d'empires", 2013, 380 p.
