= 158th meridian =

158th meridian may refer to:

- 158th meridian east, a line of longitude east of the Greenwich Meridian
- 158th meridian west, a line of longitude west of the Greenwich Meridian

158th meridian west	158th meridian east
