= 20th meridian =

20th meridian may refer to:

- 20th meridian east, a line of longitude east of the Greenwich Meridian
- 20th meridian west, a line of longitude west of the Greenwich Meridian
