= 159th meridian =

159th meridian may refer to:

- 159th meridian east, a line of longitude east of the Greenwich Meridian
- 159th meridian west, a line of longitude west of the Greenwich Meridian

159th meridian west	159th meridian east
