= List of medieval great powers =

The term "great power" has only been used in historiography and political science since the Congress of Vienna in 1815. Lord Castlereagh, the British Foreign Secretary, first used the term in its diplomatic context in 1814 in reference to the Treaty of Chaumont. Use of the term in the historiography of the Middle Ages is therefore idiosyncratic to each author. In historiography of the pre-modern period, it is more typical to talk of empires.

Gerry Simpson distinguishes "Great Powers", an elite group of states that manages the international legal order, from "great powers", empires or states whose military and political might define an era.

== List ==
The following is a list of empires that have been called great powers during the Middle Ages:

- China (throughout)
- Goguryeo (400-668)
- India (Pratihara dynasty, 800-950; Delhi Sultanate 1320-1351)
- Iran (Sasanians, 500–600; Samanids, 900–950; Timurids, 1400–1450)
- Byzantine Empire (500–1050)
- Göktürk Khaganate (550–600)
- Tibetan Empire (650–1250)
- The Caliphates (650–850)
- Francia (751–843)
- Turks (Onoq, 650; Seljuks, 1050–1100; Ottomans, 1450–1500)
- Vikings (800–1050)
- Bulgarian Empire (803–963)
- Khazar Khaganate (850–900)
- Kievan Rus' (900–1050)
- Buyid Dynasty (950)
- Fatimid Caliphate (950–1050)
- Liao Dynasty (950–1150)
- Holy Roman Empire (950–1200)
- Ghaznavid Dynasty (1050)
- Republic of Venice (since 1100)
- Republic of Genoa (since 1100)
- Almohad Caliphate (1150–1250)
- Ayyubid Sultanate of Egypt (1174–1250)
- Mamluk Sultanate of Egypt (1250–1517)
- Mongol Empire (1250–1450)
- Khmer Empire (1250)
- Mali Empire (1300–1450)
- Kingdom of France (since 1300)
- Chagatai Khanate (1350)
- Bengal Sultanate (1352-1576)
- Grand Duchy of Lithuania (1450)
- Spanish Empire (since 1479)
- Inca Empire (1500)
- Grand Duchy of Moscow (1500)

== See also ==
- Historic recurrence
- List of ancient great powers
- List of modern great powers
