= 160th meridian =

160th meridian may refer to:

- 160th meridian east, a line of longitude east of the Greenwich Meridian
- 160th meridian west, a line of longitude west of the Greenwich Meridian

160th meridian west	160th meridian east
