= 160th meridian west =

Line of longitude

160th meridian west (interactive map)

The meridian 160° west of Greenwich is a line of longitude that extends from the North Pole across the Arctic Ocean, North America, the Pacific Ocean, the Southern Ocean, and Antarctica to the South Pole.

The 160th meridian west forms a great ellipse with the 20th meridian east.

It is the western boundary of continuous Class E airspace between 14, 500 feet and 18,000 feet MSL (Mean Sea Level) over Alaska.

== From Pole to Pole ==
Starting at the North Pole and heading south to the South Pole, the 160th meridian west passes through:

Co-ordinates	Country, territory or sea	Notes
90°0′N 160°0′W	Arctic Ocean	
71°34′N 160°0′W	Chukchi Sea	
70°40′N 160°0′W	United States	Alaska
58°53′N 160°0′W	Bering Sea	Bristol Bay
56°29′N 160°0′W	United States	Alaska — Alaska Peninsula
55°48′N 160°0′W	Pacific Ocean	Passing just east of Karpa Island, Alaska, United States (at 55°31′N 160°1′W); Passing just east of Andronica Island, Alaska, United States (at 55°19′N 160°1′W)
55°12′N 160°0′W	United States	Alaska — Nagai Island
55°2′N 160°0′W	Pacific Ocean	Passing just west of the island of Kauai, Hawaii, United States (at 22°1′N 159°48′W); Passing just east of the island of Niihau, Hawaii, United States (at 21°59′N 160°3′W); Passing just east of Jarvis Island, United States Minor Outlying Islands (at 0°23′S 160°1′W); Passing just west of Aitutaki island, Cook Islands (at 18°54′S 159°50′W); Passing just west of Rarotonga island, Cook Islands (at 21°12′S 159°49′W)
60°0′S 160°0′W	Southern Ocean	
77°59′S 160°0′W	Antarctica	Ross Dependency, claimed by New Zealand

== See also ==
- 159th meridian west
- 161st meridian west
