= 156th meridian west =

Line of longitude

156th meridian west

The meridian 156° west of Greenwich is a line of longitude that extends from the North Pole across the Arctic Ocean, North America, the Pacific Ocean, the Southern Ocean, and Antarctica to the South Pole.

The 156th meridian west forms a great circle with the 24th meridian east.

== From Pole to Pole ==
Starting at the North Pole and heading south to the South Pole, the 156th meridian west passes through:

Co-ordinates	Country, territory or sea	Notes
90°0′N 156°0′W	Arctic Ocean	
71°11′N 156°0′W	United States	Alaska
57°33′N 156°0′W	Pacific Ocean	Passing just west of Chirikof Island, Alaska, United States (at 55°54′N 155°33′W)
20°48′N 156°0′W	United States	Hawaii — Maui island
20°42′N 156°0′W	Pacific Ocean	ʻAlenuihāhā Channel
19°49′N 156°0′W	United States	Hawaii — Hawaii island
19°38′N 156°0′W	Pacific Ocean	Passing just west of Starbuck Island, Kiribati (at 5°37′S 155°56′W); The meridian defines the eastern maritime boundary of the Cook Islands from 8°0′S 156°0′W to 23°0′S 156°0′W
60°0′S 156°0′W	Southern Ocean	
77°7′S 156°0′W	Antarctica	Ross Dependency, claimed by New Zealand

== See also ==
- 155th meridian west
- 157th meridian west
