= 24th meridian east =

Line of longitude

24th meridian east

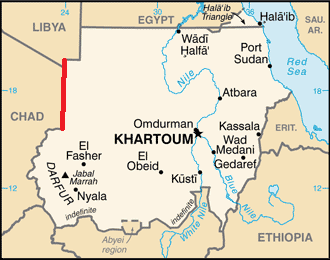
The 24th meridian defines part of Sudan's borders with Libya and Chad.

The meridian 24° east of Greenwich is a line of longitude that extends from the North Pole across the Arctic Ocean, the Atlantic Ocean, Europe, Africa, the Indian Ocean, the Southern Ocean, and Antarctica to the South Pole.

The 24th meridian east forms a great circle with the 156th meridian west.

Part of the border between Libya and Sudan is defined by the meridian, as is a large section of the border between Chad and Sudan.

The only capital located on the 24th meridian east is Riga.

== From Pole to Pole ==
Starting at the North Pole and heading south to the South Pole, the 24th meridian east passes through:

| Co-ordinates | Country, territory or sea | Notes |
|---|---|---|
| 90°0′N 24°0′E | Arctic Ocean | |
| 80°18′N 24°0′E | Norway | Island of Nordaustlandet, Svalbard |
| 79°14′N 24°0′E | Barents Sea | |
| 77°52′N 24°0′E | Norway | Island of Edgeøya, Svalbard |
| 77°33′N 24°0′E | Barents Sea | |
| 71°57′N 24°0′E | Atlantic Ocean | Norwegian Sea |
| 71°3′N 24°0′E | Norway | Islands of Ingøy and Rolvsøy |
| 70°55′N 24°0′E | Atlantic Ocean | Norwegian Sea |
| 70°41′N 24°0′E | Norway | Island of Kvaløya, and the mainland |
| 68°49′N 24°0′E | Finland | |
| 66°50′N 24°0′E | Sweden | For about 4 km |
| 66°48′N 24°0′E | Finland | |
| 66°2′N 24°0′E | Sweden | |
| 65°48′N 24°0′E | Baltic Sea | Gulf of Bothnia |
| 64°24′N 24°0′E | Finland | |
| 60°1′N 24°0′E | Baltic Sea | Gulf of Finland |
| 59°21′N 24°0′E | Estonia | Island of Väike-Pakri and the mainland |
| 58°18′N 24°0′E | Baltic Sea | Gulf of Riga |
| 58°9′N 24°0′E | Estonia | Island of Kihnu |
| 58°6′N 24°0′E | Baltic Sea | Gulf of Riga |
| 57°2′N 24°0′E | Latvia | Passing through west outskirts of Riga |
| 56°20′N 24°0′E | Lithuania | Passing through Kaunas Passing just west of Birštonas |
| 53°56′N 24°0′E | Belarus | |
| 51°35′N 24°0′E | Ukraine | Volyn Oblast — passing just east of Liuboml |
| 50°56′N 24°0′E | Poland | For about 10 km |
| 50°51′N 24°0′E | Ukraine | For about 7 km — Volyn Oblast |
| 50°46′N 24°0′E | Poland | |
| 50°26′N 24°0′E | Ukraine | Lviv Oblast — passing through Lviv; Ivano-Frankivsk Oblast — passing through Dolyna; Zakarpattia Oblast — passing just west of Rakhiv |
| 47°58′N 24°0′E | Romania | |
| 43°45′N 24°0′E | Bulgaria | |
| 41°27′N 24°0′E | Greece | |
| 40°45′N 24°0′E | Mediterranean Sea | Aegean Sea |
| 40°23′N 24°0′E | Greece | Peninsula of Mount Athos |
| 40°19′N 24°0′E | Mediterranean Sea | Aegean Sea |
| 40°5′N 24°0′E | Greece | Peninsula of Sithonia |
| 39°58′N 24°0′E | Mediterranean Sea | Aegean Sea - passing just west of the island of Kyra Panagia and just east of the islands of Alonissos and Peristera, Greece |
| 38°41′N 24°0′E | Greece | Island of Euboea |
| 38°24′N 24°0′E | Mediterranean Sea | Euripus Strait, Aegean Sea |
| 38°15′N 24°0′E | Greece | |
| 37°40′N 24°0′E | Mediterranean Sea | Aegean Sea and Sea of Crete |
| 35°31′N 24°0′E | Greece | Island of Crete |
| 35°13′N 24°0′E | Mediterranean Sea | |
| 34°56′N 24°0′E | Greece | Island of Gavdopoula |
| 34°55′N 24°0′E | Mediterranean Sea | Passing just west of the island of Gavdos, Greece |
| 32°6′N 24°0′E | Libya | |
| 20°0′N 24°0′E | Libya / Sudan border | |
| 19°30′N 24°0′E | Chad / Sudan border | |
| 15°42′N 24°0′E | Sudan | |
| 8°42′N 24°0′E | Central African Republic | |
| 5°52′N 24°0′E | Democratic Republic of the Congo | |
| 10°53′S 24°0′E | Zambia | For about 5 km |
| 10°55′S 24°0′E | Angola | |
| 11°36′S 24°0′E | Zambia | For about 16 km |
| 11°45′S 24°0′E | Angola | For about 11 km |
| 11°51′S 24°0′E | Zambia | |
| 12°10′S 24°0′E | Angola | |
| 12°29′S 24°0′E | Zambia | |
| 12°55′S 24°0′E | Angola | |
| 12°59′S 24°0′E | Zambia | |
| 17°31′S 24°0′E | Namibia | Caprivi Strip |
| 18°10′S 24°0′E | Botswana | |
| 25°37′S 24°0′E | South Africa | North West; Northern Cape; Western Cape; Eastern Cape |
| 34°2′S 24°0′E | Indian Ocean | |
| 60°0′S 24°0′E | Southern Ocean | |
| 70°17′S 24°0′E | Antarctica | Queen Maud Land, claimed by Norway |

== See also ==
- 23rd meridian east
- 25th meridian east
- Measuring a Meridian: The Adventures of Three Englishmen and Three Russians in South Africa
