= 157th meridian west =

Line of longitude

157th meridian west

The meridian 157° west of Greenwich is a line of longitude that extends from the North Pole across the Arctic Ocean, North America, the Pacific Ocean, the Southern Ocean, and Antarctica to the South Pole.

The 157th meridian west forms a great circle with the 23rd meridian east.

== From Pole to Pole ==
Starting at the North Pole and heading south to the South Pole, the 157th meridian west passes through:

Co-ordinates	Country, territory or sea	Notes
90°0′N 157°0′W	Arctic Ocean	
71°12′N 157°0′W	United States	Alaska
56°54′N 157°0′W	Pacific Ocean	
56°33′N 157°0′W	United States	Alaska — Sutwik Island
56°32′N 157°0′W	Pacific Ocean	Passing just west of the Semidi Islands, Alaska, United States (at 56°11′N 156°49′W)
21°11′N 157°0′W	United States	Hawaii — Molokai island
21°5′N 157°0′W	Pacific Ocean	Kalohi Channel
20°56′N 157°0′W	United States	Hawaii — Lanai island
20°50′N 157°0′W	Pacific Ocean	
60°0′S 157°0′W	Southern Ocean	
77°20′S 157°0′W	Antarctica	Ross Dependency, claimed by New Zealand

== See also ==
- 156th meridian west
- 158th meridian west
