= Gerry Simpson =

Australian academic

Gerry John Simpson is Professor (chair) of Public International Law at the London School of Economics. He previously held the Sir Kenneth Bailey Chair of Law at the Melbourne Law School. He was born in Fraserburgh, Aberdeenshire. Simpson studied law at the University of Aberdeen, the University of British Columbia, and the University of Michigan in Ann Arbor, where he received his doctorate of law. He has taught at the University of British Columbia, the University of Melbourne, and the Australian National University. He has also served as a visiting professor at Sydney Law School (1996), Harvard Law School (1999) and New York University (2018).

Simpson is on the editorial board of The London Review of International Law and is a contributor to the quarterly publication Arena.
