= 159th meridian west =

Line of longitude

159th meridian west

The meridian 159° west of Greenwich is a line of longitude that extends from the North Pole across the Arctic Ocean, North America, the Pacific Ocean, the Southern Ocean, and Antarctica to the South Pole.

The 159th meridian west forms a great circle with the 21st meridian east.

== From Pole to Pole ==
Starting at the North Pole and heading south to the South Pole, the 159th meridian west passes through:

Co-ordinates	Country, territory or sea	Notes
90°0′N 159°0′W	Arctic Ocean	
71°31′N 159°0′W	Chukchi Sea	
70°53′N 159°0′W	United States	Alaska — Point Franklin
70°52′N 159°0′W	Chukchi Sea	Peard Bay
70°48′N 159°0′W	United States	Alaska
58°25′N 159°0′W	Bering Sea	Bristol Bay
56°50′N 159°0′W	United States	Alaska — Alaska Peninsula
55°53′N 159°0′W	Pacific Ocean	Passing just east of Chiachi Island, Alaska, United States (at 55°50′N 159°5′W); Passing just west of Mitrofania Island, Alaska, United States (at 55°49′N 158°53′W); Passing just east of Simeonof Island, Alaska, United States (at 54°55′N 159°11′W); Passing just east of Kauai island, Hawaii, United States (at 22°8′N 159°18′W); Passing just west of Manuae atoll, Cook Islands (at 19°15′S 158°57′W)
60°0′S 159°0′W	Southern Ocean	
77°54′S 159°0′W	Antarctica	Ross Dependency, claimed by New Zealand

== See also ==
- 158th meridian west
- 160th meridian west
