= Karpa Island =

Coordinates: 55°30′38″N 160°02′57″W

Karpa Island is a small island in Aleutians East Borough, Alaska, United States. It lies just south of the Alaska Peninsula's Stepovak Bay. The island has a land area of 1.861 km^{2} (459.77 acres) and is unpopulated.
