= North Branch, Newfoundland and Labrador =

North Branch
- Farming Village
- Location of North Branch in Newfoundland
- Coordinates: 48°00′46.42″N 58°55′38.69″W
- Country: Canada
- Province: Newfoundland and Labrador

Population (2006)
  - Total: ?
- Time zone: UTC-3:30 (Newfoundland Time)
  - Summer (DST): UTC-2:30 (Newfoundland Daylight)
- Area code: 709

North Branch is a small farming community located on the West coast of the island of Newfoundland in the Canadian province of Newfoundland and Labrador. The name takes its name from its close proximity of the Codroy River near the banks of the north branch of that river.

== See also ==
- List of communities in Newfoundland and Labrador
