= 23rd meridian east =

Line of longitude

23rd meridian east

The meridian 23° east of Greenwich is a line of longitude that extends from the North Pole across the Arctic Ocean, the Atlantic Ocean, Europe, Africa, the Indian Ocean, the Southern Ocean, and Antarctica to the South Pole.

The 23rd meridian east forms a great circle with the 157th meridian west.

== From Pole to Pole ==
Starting at the North Pole and heading south to the South Pole, the 23rd meridian east passes through:

Co-ordinates	Country, territory or sea	Notes
90°0′N 23°0′E	Arctic Ocean	
80°27′N 23°0′E	Norway	Island of Nordaustlandet, Svalbard
79°16′N 23°0′E	Barents Sea	
78°13′N 23°0′E	Norway	Island of Edgeøya, Svalbard
77°18′N 23°0′E	Barents Sea	
72°25′N 23°0′E	Atlantic Ocean	Norwegian Sea
70°51′N 23°0′E	Norway	Islands of Sørøya, Seiland, Stjernøya and the mainland
68°42′N 23°0′E	Finland	
68°19′N 23°0′E	Sweden	
65°45′N 23°0′E	Baltic Sea	Gulf of Bothnia
63°49′N 23°0′E	Finland	
59°50′N 23°0′E	Baltic Sea	
58°55′N 23°0′E	Estonia	Island of Hiiumaa
58°50′N 23°0′E	Baltic Sea	Kassaare Bay
58°36′N 23°0′E	Estonia	Island of Saaremaa
58°21′N 23°0′E	Baltic Sea	Gulf of Riga - passing just west of the island of Ruhnu, Estonia
57°24′N 23°0′E	Latvia	
56°24′N 23°0′E	Lithuania	
54°22′N 23°0′E	Poland	Passing just west of Białystok
49°51′N 23°0′E	Ukraine	Lviv Oblast — passing just west of Sambir; Zakarpattia Oblast — passing just east of Mukacheve
48°0′N 23°0′E	Romania	
44°6′N 23°0′E	Bulgaria	For about 9 km
44°1′N 23°0′E	Romania	
43°49′N 23°0′E	Bulgaria	
43°12′N 23°0′E	Serbia	For about 7 km - easternmost point of the country
43°9′N 23°0′E	Bulgaria	
41°47′N 23°0′E	North Macedonia	For about 10 km - easternmost point of the country
41°41′N 23°0′E	Bulgaria	
41°20′N 23°0′E	Greece	
40°22′N 23°0′E	Mediterranean Sea	Aegean Sea
39°33′N 23°0′E	Greece	
39°21′N 23°0′E	Mediterranean Sea	Pagasetic Gulf, Aegean Sea
39°1′N 23°0′E	Greece	Mainland and island of Euboea
38°53′N 23°0′E	Mediterranean Sea	Euripus Strait, Aegean Sea
38°45′N 23°0′E	Greece	
38°13′N 23°0′E	Alkyonides Gulf	
38°4′N 23°0′E	Greece	Peloponnese
37°29′N 23°0′E	Mediterranean Sea	Argolic Gulf, Aegean Sea
37°2′N 23°0′E	Greece	Peloponnese
36°31′N 23°0′E	Mediterranean Sea	
36°19′N 23°0′E	Greece	Island of Kythira
36°9′N 23°0′E	Mediterranean Sea	
32°39′N 23°0′E	Libya	
20°1′N 23°0′E	Chad	
15°35′N 23°0′E	Sudan	
10°43′N 23°0′E	Central African Republic	
4°47′N 23°0′E	Democratic Republic of the Congo	
11°6′S 23°0′E	Angola	
13°0′S 23°0′E	Zambia	
17°17′S 23°0′E	Angola	
17°43′S 23°0′E	Namibia	Caprivi Strip
18°1′S 23°0′E	Botswana	
25°20′S 23°0′E	South Africa	North West; Northern Cape; Western Cape; Eastern Cape; Western Cape
34°4′S 23°0′E	Indian Ocean	
60°0′S 23°0′E	Southern Ocean	
70°6′S 23°0′E	Antarctica	Queen Maud Land, claimed by Norway

== Meridian 22.5° East ==
Meridian 22.5° East crosses most countries (sovereign states) from all meridians: 26 in total. When Svalbard (in the North) and Antarctica (in the South) are added it crosses 28 territories.

From North to South: Norway, Finland, Sweden, Estonia, Latvia, Lithuania, Russia (Kaliningrad), Poland, Slovakia, Ukraine, Hungary, Romania, Serbia, Bulgaria, North Macedonia, Greece, Libya, Chad, Sudan, Central African Republic, Congo Democratic Republic, Angola, Zambia, Namibia, Botswana and South Africa.

The line could be drawn from Tappeluft in Norway (the most northern town on mainland on this meridian) to George in South Africa (the most southern city on this meridian) which is 11,573 km. It crosses also Turku in Finland. Meridian 22° East misses Ukraine and Bulgaria and Meridian 23° East misses Russia (Kaliningrad), Slovakia and Hungary. Halfway both meridians, on 22.5° EL, those missing countries are on the line.

== See also ==
- 22nd meridian east
- 24th meridian east
