= Confusion Bay, Newfoundland and Labrador =

Coordinates: 49°56′43″N 55°44′55″W

Location of Confusion Bay in Newfoundland

Confusion Bay is a natural bay located on the north-east tip of the Baie Verte Peninsula of the island of Newfoundland, in the Canadian province of Newfoundland and Labrador.

Communities within Confusion Bay are Harbour Round and Brent's Cove.
