= 158th meridian west =

Line of longitude

158th meridian west (interactive map)

The meridian 158° west of Greenwich is a line of longitude that extends from the North Pole across the Arctic Ocean, North America, the Pacific Ocean, the Southern Ocean, and Antarctica to the South Pole.

The 158th meridian west forms a great circle with the 22nd meridian east.

== From Pole to Pole ==
Starting at the North Pole and heading south to the South Pole, the 158th meridian west passes through:

Co-ordinates	Country, territory or sea	Notes
90°0′N 158°0′W	Arctic Ocean	
70°50′N 158°0′W	Chukchi Sea	
71°12′N 158°0′W	United States	Alaska
58°38′N 158°0′W	Bering Sea	Bristol Bay
57°24′N 158°0′W	United States	Alaska — Alaska Peninsula
56°30′N 158°0′W	Pacific Ocean	Passing just west of Nakchamik Island, Alaska, United States (at 56°20′N 157°54′W); Passing just east of Castle Cape, Alaska Peninsula, United States (at 56°14′N 158°7′W); Passing just east of Chankliut Island, Alaska, United States (at 56°9′N 158°6′W)
21°42′N 158°0′W	United States	Hawaii — Oahu island
21°18′N 158°0′W	Pacific Ocean	Passing just west of Kiritimati island, Kiribati (at 1°52′N 157°51′W)
8°56′S 158°0′W	Cook Islands	Penrhyn Island
9°4′S 158°0′W	Pacific Ocean	Passing just east of Atiu island, Cook Islands (at 20°0′S 158°4′W); Passing just west of Mangaia island, Cook Islands (at 21°55′S 157°58′W)
60°0′S 158°0′W	Southern Ocean	
77°45′S 158°0′W	Antarctica	Ross Dependency, claimed by New Zealand

== See also ==
- 157th meridian west
- 159th meridian west
