= London Review of International Law =

The London Review of International Law
- Discipline: International law
- Language: English
- Edited by: Gerry Simpson

Publication details
- History: 2013–present
- ISO 4: Find out here

The London Review of International Law is an online only, peer-reviewed scholarly journal. Its first issue was published in September, 2013. Each issue includes three sections: scholarly, review, and supplementary (including reprints, foreign translations, or archival information).

Gerry Simpson, a Professor at the London School of Economics, is one of the current editors.
