= 22nd meridian east =

Line of longitude

22nd meridian east (interactive map)

The meridian 22° east of Greenwich is a line of longitude that extends from the North Pole across the Arctic Ocean, the Atlantic Ocean, Europe, Africa, the Indian Ocean, the Southern Ocean, and Antarctica to the South Pole.

The 22nd meridian east forms a great ellipse with the 158th meridian west.

Part of the border between Angola and Zambia is defined by the meridian.

== From Pole to Pole ==
Starting at the North Pole and heading south to the South Pole, the 22nd meridian east passes through:

Co-ordinates	Country, territory or sea	Notes
90°0′N 22°0′E	Arctic Ocean	
80°8′N 22°0′E	Norway	Island of Nordaustlandet, Svalbard
79°22′N 22°0′E	Barents Sea	
78°33′N 22°0′E	Norway	Islands of Barentsøya and Edgeøya, Svalbard
77°31′N 22°0′E	Barents Sea	
72°55′N 22°0′E	Atlantic Ocean	Norwegian Sea
70°39′N 22°0′E	Norway	Island of Sørøya
70°35′N 22°0′E	Atlantic Ocean	Norwegian Sea
70°19′N 22°0′E	Norway	
69°3′N 22°0′E	Finland	
68°32′N 22°0′E	Sweden	
65°22′N 22°0′E	Baltic Sea	Gulf of Bothnia
63°23′N 22°0′E	Finland	The mainland and several islands, including Luonnonmaa and Lillandet
60°7′N 22°0′E	Baltic Sea	Passing just west of the island of Hiiumaa, Estonia
58°31′N 22°0′E	Estonia	Island of Saaremaa
58°14′N 22°0′E	Baltic Sea	
57°59′N 22°0′E	Estonia	Island of Saaremaa
57°57′N 22°0′E	Baltic Sea	
57°36′N 22°0′E	Latvia	
56°25′N 22°0′E	Lithuania	
55°5′N 22°0′E	Russia	Kaliningrad Oblast (exclave)
54°20′N 22°0′E	Poland	Passing through Rzeszów
49°18′N 22°0′E	Slovakia	
48°23′N 22°0′E	Hungary	
47°23′N 22°0′E	Romania	
44°38′N 22°0′E	Serbia	Passing just east of Leskovac
42°20′N 22°0′E	North Macedonia	
41°8′N 22°0′E	Greece	
38°23′N 22°0′E	Gulf of Corinth	
38°19′N 22°0′E	Greece	Peloponnese
37°1′N 22°0′E	Mediterranean Sea	
32°54′N 22°0′E	Libya	
20°32′N 22°0′E	Chad	
13°6′N 22°0′E	Sudan	
12°38′N 22°0′E	Chad	
10°52′N 22°0′E	Central African Republic	
4°14′N 22°0′E	Democratic Republic of the Congo	
9°45′S 22°0′E	Angola	
13°0′S 22°0′E	Angola / Zambia border	
16°12′S 22°0′E	Angola	
17°55′S 22°0′E	Namibia	Caprivi Strip
18°13′S 22°0′E	Botswana	
26°39′S 22°0′E	South Africa	Northern Cape; Western Cape
34°13′S 22°0′E	Indian Ocean	
60°0′S 22°0′E	Southern Ocean	
70°9′S 22°0′E	Antarctica	Queen Maud Land, claimed by Norway

== Meridian 22.5° East ==
Meridian 22.5° East crosses most countries (sovereign states) from all meridians: 26 in total. When Svalbard (in the North) and Antarctica (in the South) are added it crosses 28 territories.

From North to South: Norway, Finland, Sweden, Estonia, Latvia, Lithuania, Russia (Kaliningrad), Poland, Slovakia, Ukraine, Hungary, Romania, Serbia, Bulgaria, North Macedonia, Greece, Libya, Chad, Sudan, Central African Republic, Congo Democratic Republic, Angola, Zambia, Namibia, Botswana and South Africa.

The line could be drawn from Tappeluft in Norway (the most northern town on mainland on this meridian) to George in South Africa (the most southern city on this meridian) which is 11,573 km. It crosses also Turku in Finland. Meridian 22° East misses Ukraine and Bulgaria and Meridian 23° East misses Russia (Kaliningrad), Slovakia and Hungary. Halfway both meridians, on 22.5° EL, those missing countries are on the line.

== See also ==
- 21st meridian east
- 23rd meridian east
