= 20th meridian east =

Line of longitude

20th meridian east

The meridian 20° east of Greenwich is a line of longitude that extends from the North Pole across the Arctic Ocean, Europe, Africa, the Atlantic and Indian oceans, the Southern Ocean, and Antarctica to the South Pole.

The 20th meridian east forms a great ellipse with the 160th meridian west.

Part of Namibia's borders with Botswana and South Africa are defined by the meridian. The boundary between the Atlantic Ocean and the Indian Ocean is defined by the meridian. The meridian defines the eastern limit of the New Swabia area in Queen Maud Land, Antarctica.

== From Pole to Pole ==
Starting at the North Pole and heading south to the South Pole, the 20th meridian east passes through:

Co-ordinates	Country, territory or sea	Notes
90°0′N 20°0′E	Arctic Ocean	
80°32′N 20°0′E	Norway	Islands of Nordaustlandet and Spitsbergen, Svalbard
78°37′N 20°0′E	Barents Sea	
73°54′N 20°0′E	Atlantic Ocean	Norwegian Sea
70°10′N 20°0′E	Norway	Island of Vanna, and the mainland
68°34′N 20°0′E	Sweden	For about 2 km
68°33′N 20°0′E	Norway	For about 18 km
68°23′N 20°0′E	Sweden	
63°37′N 20°0′E	Baltic Sea	Gulf of Bothnia
60°24′N 20°0′E	Finland (Åland Islands)	Island of Fasta Åland
60°1′N 20°0′E	Baltic Sea	
54°57′N 20°0′E	Russia	Kaliningrad Oblast (exclave)
54°25′N 20°0′E	Poland	Passing through Kraków (where crosses with 50th parallel north)
49°13′N 20°0′E	Slovakia	Passing through the mountain of Kriváň
48°10′N 20°0′E	Hungary	Passing just west of Szeged
46°10′N 20°0′E	Serbia	
43°4′N 20°0′E	Montenegro	
42°31′N 20°0′E	Albania	
39°41′N 20°0′E	Mediterranean Sea	Ionian Sea
39°27′N 20°0′E	Greece	Island of Corfu
39°24′N 20°0′E	Mediterranean Sea	Ionian Sea and the Mediterranean proper
32°1′N 20°0′E	Libya	
31°28′N 20°0′E	Mediterranean Sea	Gulf of Sidra
30°46′N 20°0′E	Libya	
21°33′N 20°0′E	Chad	
9°7′N 20°0′E	Central African Republic	
4°58′N 20°0′E	Democratic Republic of the Congo	
7°0′S 20°0′E	Angola	
17°53′S 20°0′E	Namibia	
22°0′S 20°0′E	Namibia / Botswana border	
24°45′S 20°0′E	Namibia / South Africa (Northern Cape) border	
28°26′S 20°0′E	South Africa	Northern Cape; Western Cape
34°50′S 20°0′E	Atlantic Ocean / Indian Ocean boundary	
60°0′S 20°0′E	Southern Ocean	
69°53′S 20°0′E	Antarctica	Queen Maud Land, claimed by Norway

== See also ==
- 19th meridian east
- 21st meridian east
