= 21st meridian east =

Line of longitude

21st meridian east

The meridian 21° east of Greenwich is a line of longitude that extends from the North Pole across the Arctic Ocean, the Atlantic Ocean, Europe, Africa, the Indian Ocean, the Southern Ocean, and Antarctica to the South Pole.

The 21st meridian east forms a great ellipse with the 159th meridian west.

Part of Namibia's border with Botswana is defined by the meridian.

== From Pole to Pole ==
Starting at the North Pole and heading south to the South Pole, the 21st meridian east passes through:

Co-ordinates	Country, territory or sea	Notes
90°0′N 21°0′E	Arctic Ocean	
80°43′N 21°0′E	Norway	Svalbard - island of Tavleøya
80°42′N 21°0′E	Arctic Ocean	
80°13′N 21°0′E	Norway	Svalbard - island of Nordaustlandet
79°21′N 21°0′E	Barents Sea	
79°2′N 21°0′E	Norway	Svalbard - islands of Bastian Insel, Spitsbergen, Barentsøya and Edgeøya
78°2′N 21°0′E	Barents Sea	
77°35′N 21°0′E	Norway	Svalbard - island of Edgeøya
77°27′N 21°0′E	Barents Sea	
73°24′N 21°0′E	Atlantic Ocean	Norwegian Sea
70°3′N 21°0′E	Norway	Islands of Skjervøya, Kågen and the mainland
69°3′N 21°0′E	Finland	
68°53′N 21°0′E	Sweden	
64°9′N 21°0′E	Baltic Sea	Gulf of Bothnia, passing just east of the Holmöarna islands, Sweden and passing just west of the island of Replot and the mainland, Finland
60°39′N 21°0′E	Åland Islands	Numerous islands
59°55′N 21°0′E	Baltic Sea	
56°30′N 21°0′E	Latvia	Passing through Liepāja
56°12′N 21°0′E	Baltic Sea	
55°20′N 21°0′E	Lithuania	Curonian Spit
55°17′N 21°0′E	Curonian Lagoon	
54°54′N 21°0′E	Russia	Kaliningrad Oblast (exclave)
54°21′N 21°0′E	Poland	Passing through Warsaw
49°20′N 21°0′E	Slovakia	
48°31′N 21°0′E	Hungary	
46°16′N 21°0′E	Romania	
45°21′N 21°0′E	Serbia	passing near cities of Smederevo and Kragujevac, passing through Trstenik
43°7′N 21°0′E	Kosovo or Serbia	Kosovo is a partially recognised state. Some nations consider its territory to be part of Serbia.
42°8′N 21°0′E	North Macedonia	
41°1′N 21°0′E	Lake Prespa	
40°49′N 21°0′E	Greece	For about 8 km
40°44′N 21°0′E	Albania	
40°32′N 21°0′E	Greece	Passing through the Ambracian Gulf
38°38′N 21°0′E	Mediterranean Sea	Ionian Sea, passing just east of the island of Zakynthos
37°16′N 21°0′E	Greece	Strofades islands
37°15′N 21°0′E	Mediterranean Sea	
32°44′N 21°0′E	Libya	
21°3′N 21°0′E	Chad	
9°44′N 21°0′E	Central African Republic	
4°25′N 21°0′E	Democratic Republic of the Congo	
7°17′S 21°0′E	Angola	
17°57′S 21°0′E	Namibia	
18°19′S 21°0′E	Namibia / Botswana border	
22°0′S 21°0′E	Botswana	
26°50′S 21°0′E	South Africa	Northern Cape; Western Cape
34°22′S 21°0′E	Indian Ocean	
60°0′S 21°0′E	Southern Ocean	
69°59′S 21°0′E	Antarctica	Queen Maud Land, claimed by Norway

== See also ==
- 20th meridian east
- 22nd meridian east
