= Encrasicholina punctifer =

Conservation status
- Least Concern (IUCN 3.1)

Scientific classification
- Kingdom: Animalia
- Phylum: Chordata
- Class: Actinopterygii
- Division: Teleostei
- Order: Clupeiformes
- Family: Engraulidae
- Genus: Encrasicholina
- Species: E. punctifer

Binomial name
- Encrasicholina punctifer Fowler, 1938

Synonyms
- Stolephorus punctifer (Fowler, 1938); Stolephorus buccaneeri Strasburg, 1960

Species of ray-finned fish

Encrasicholina punctifer, known as the Buccaneer anchovy or oceanic anchovy, is a species of marine ray-finned fish belonging to the family Engraulidae, the anchovies. This anchovy has a wide Indo-Pacific distribution.

== Taxonomy ==
Encrasicholina punctifer was first formally described in 1938 by the American zoologist Henry Weed Fowler with its type locality given as Fare Bay, Huaheine Island in the Society Islands of French Polynesia. in 1960 the American marine biologist Donald Wishart Strasburg described a new species of anchovy from offshore waters in Hawaii which he named Stolephorus buccaneeri but this taxon now considered to be a synonym of E. punctifer. The genus Encrasicholina is classified in the subfamily Engraulinae, the "typical anchovies", in the anchovy family Engraulidae within the suborder Clupeoidei the order Clupeiformes, the herring-like fishes. This taxon was previously thought to occur in the western Indian Ocean, Red Sea, Persian Gulf and eastern Mediterranean Sea, as a Lessepsian migrant, but in 2016 the Red Sea anchovy (E. gloria) and the East African anchovy (E. intermedia) were described as new species.

== Etymology ==
Encrasicholina punctifer is a mamber of the genus Encrasicholina, a name which is derived from enkrasícholos, an Ancient Greek word for a small fish dating as far back as Aristotle and now mainly applied to anchovies. The spcific name, punctifer, means "bearing spots", a reference to the black spots on the gill cover and, maybe, also the tail base.: The common name Buccaneer anchovy refers to the M. V. Buccaneer from Honolulu, whose captain, Noboru Tsue, supplied some of the type series of S. buccaneeri.

== Description ==
Encrasicholina punctifer has a fusiform body with a round crosssection which reaches a total length of 13 cm (5.1 in). There are between 12 and 15 soft rays in the dorsal fin and between 14 and 17 in the anal fin. It has a rounded belly which has 3 to 6 sharp scutes on it. The maxilla is blunt and barely reaches past the second supramaxilla and does not extendas far as the front of the pre-operculum. The short anal fin has its origin to posterior to the last dorsal fin ray.

== Distribution and habitat ==
Encrasicholina punctifer is distributed from the eastern Indian Ocean off Myanmar and the Andaman Islands east into the Pacific Ocean as far as French Polynesia and Hawaii, north to Japan and south to Australia. In Australia is found from Port Hedland, Western Australia, around the north coast and south to Bowen, Queensland.

== Utilisation ==
Encrasicholina punctifer is an important target species for fisheries in many areas where it occurs. It is sold fresh, dried, dried-salted or used in fish meal, fish sauce, fish paste or fish balls. It is also caught to be used as bait in fisheries targeting larger species.
