= US FWS Hugh M. Smith =

U.S. fisheries research vessel

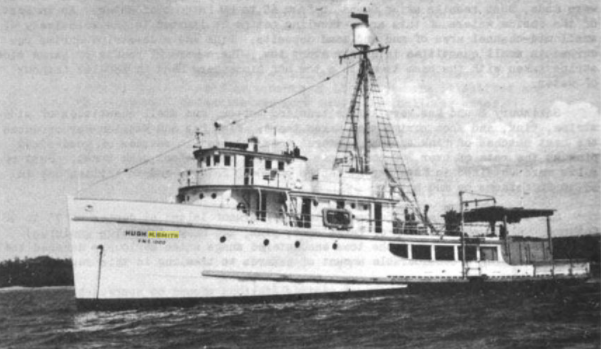
- US FWS Hugh M. Smith anchored in Kihei Bay off Maui, Territory of Hawaii, ca. 1950

United States Navy
- Name: USS YP-635
- Builder: Ballard Marine Railway Company, Seattle, Washington
- Completed: 1945
- Commissioned: May 1945
- Stricken: 1963
- Honors and awards: American Campaign Medal; World War II Victory Medal
- Fate: Transferred to Fish and Wildlife Service November 1948; Transferred to U.S. Navy 1963; Transferred to Government of American Samoa

U.S. Fish and Wildlife Service
- Name: US FWS Hugh M. Smith
- Namesake: Hugh McCormick Smith (1865–1941), U.S. Commissioner of Fisheries (1913–1922)
- Acquired: November 1948
- Commissioned: 1949
- Decommissioned: June 1959
- Home port: Pearl Harbor, Territory of Hawaii (1949–1958); Honolulu, Hawaii (1958–1959); San Diego, California (Scripps, 1959–1963)
- Fate: Transferred to U.S. Navy 1963
- Notes: Leased to Scripps Institution of Oceanography 23 June 1959–4 November 1963

United States
- Name: MV Hugh M. Smith
- Namesake: Previous name retained
- Operator: Government of American Samoa
- Home port: American Samoa
- Fate: Transferred to Philippine Merchant Marine Academy 1965

Philippines
- Name: RPLS Habagat ("South Wind")
- Namesake: Habagat, the southwest monsoon
- Operator: Philippine Merchant Marine Academy
- Acquired: 1965
- Fate: Capsized at pier in storm, late 1970s

General characteristics (as U.S. Navy vessel)
- Type: Patrol vessel
- Displacement: 403 tons
- Length: 117 ft (36 m)

General characteristics (as FWS fisheries research vessel)
- Type: Fisheries research ship
- Tonnage: 550 GRT
- Length: 128 ft (39 m)
- Beam: 29 ft (8.8 m)
- Draft: 15 ft (4.6 m)
- Installed power: 2 x 125-kW diesel–electric generators
- Propulsion: 560 hp (420 kW) diesel engine

General characteristics (as Scripps Institution research vessel)
- Type: Research ship
- Length: 128 ft (39 m)
- Beam: 29 ft (8.8 m)
- Draft: 14 ft (4.3 m)
- Speed: 9 knots (17 km/h; 10 mph) (cruising)
- Range: 10,000 nautical miles (19,000 km; 12,000 mi)
- Endurance: 45 days
- Crew: 14, plus up to 8 embarked scientists

US FWS Hugh M. Smith was an American fisheries science research vessel in commission from 1949 to 1959 in the fleet of the United States Department of the Interior's Fish and Wildlife Service. She was among the first U.S. fisheries science vessels to explore the central Pacific Ocean in search of commercially valuable populations of fish.

Prior to her time in the Fish and Wildlife Service, the vessel was in commission in the United States Navy as the patrol vessel USS YP-635. After her Fish and Wildlife Service career ended, she was leased to the Scripps Institution of Oceanography from 1959 to 1963, then operated in American Samoa during the mid-1960s, and finally served the Philippine Merchant Marine Academy as the laboratory training ship Habagat from 1965 until she capsized in a storm in the late 1970s.

== U.S. Navy ==
=== Construction ===
The Ballard Marine Railway Company built the vessel as the U.S. Navy patrol boat YP-635 at Seattle, Washington, in 1945. As completed, she was listed as 117 feet (36 m) in length, with a displacement of 403 tons.

=== Service history ===
The vessel was commissioned into U.S. Navy service as USS YP-635 near the end of World War II in May 1945. The war ended in August 1945, and sometime afterward YP-635 was decommissioned and laid up in reserve.

=== Honors and awards ===
YP-635 received the following awards for her World War II service:

- American Campaign Medal
- World War II Victory Medal

== Fish and Wildlife Service ==
In August 1947, the United States Congress authorized a new Pacific Ocean Fishery Program calling for the "investigation, exploration, and development of the high seas fisheries of the Territories and Island Possessions [of the United States] and intervening areas in the tropical and subtropical Pacific Ocean." The United States Department of the Interior's Fish and Wildlife Service (which in 1956 would become the United States Fish and Wildlife Service) was responsible for carrying out the program, which was to be overseen by a new Pacific Ocean Fishery Investigation (POFI) under the direction of Oscar Elton Sette. In addition to the construction of the Pacific Ocean Fisheries Laboratory at the University of Hawaii in Honolulu in the Territory of Hawaii and the development of a Fish and Wildlife Service (FWS) docking and warehouse site at Pearl Harbor, Hawaii, the Congress funded the conversion or construction of three ocean-going vessels to support POFI's work. During 1949 and 1950, these three vessels joined the Fish and Wildlife Service fleet as US FWS Henry O'Malley, US FWS Hugh M. Smith, and US FWS John R. Manning.

=== Acquisition, conversion, and commissioning ===
The U.S. Navy transferred YP-635 to the FWS in November 1948. She then underwent conversion into a fisheries science research vessel. Her conversion was completed in Tacoma, Washington, in November 1949, and the FWS commissioned her that month as US FWS Hugh M. Smith, named for Hugh McCormick Smith (1865–1941), who led the United States Bureau of Fisheries as the Commissioner of Fisheries from 1913 to 1922. Unlike the other two POFI vessels, Henry O'Malley and John R. Manning, which were fitted out as exploratory fishing vessels, Hugh M. Smith was configured as a biological and oceanographic research vessel, intended to study the life histories and habits of the tunas of the central Pacific Ocean.

As converted, Hugh M. Smith was equipped with laboratory facilities, an oceanographic winch for use in studying plankton and water temperature, live bait tanks, refrigerated holds, and an auxiliary propulsion motor that allowed her to operate at the low speeds necessary to carry out many of her scientific activities. Her fishing gear included a 480-by-36-foot (146 by 11 m) bait net, a 240-by-18-foot (73.2 by 5.5 m) bait net, and a 90-by-6-foot (27.4 by 1.8 m) bait net.

=== Service history ===
==== 1949 ====
Hugh M. Smith departed Seattle on 15 November 1949 bound for Honolulu, the second of the three fisheries research vessels the FWS assigned to POFI to enter service. After arriving in Hawaii, she put back to sea on 8 December 1949 for her first FWS cruise, a 16-day shakedown cruise in the waters of the Hawaiian Islands to test her equipment — including special equipment for catching tuna, gathering fish eggs, fish larvae, and other biological materials, and taking water samples at depth — and train her crew in fisheries research work. She operated south of Maui and off the Kona Coast of the island of Hawaii, and took a series of observations of ocean currents — which were believed to influence the occurrence of tuna — at stations extending from the coast of the island of Hawaii to a point 120 nautical miles (220 km; 140 mi) to the southwest .

==== 1950 ====
On 16 January 1950, Hugh M. Smith departed Pearl Harbor for her second FWS cruise. Her itinerary took her first to the French Frigate Shoals in the Northwestern Hawaiian Islands, where she spent 19–25 January looking for bait fish. Weather conditions permitted searches for bait on only four days and she had little success, sighting a small school of iao (Hepsetia insularum) off Tern Island on 19 January and catching five buckets of iao off East Island on 25 January, which she placed in her live bait tanks. The lack of bait contrasted sharply with the amount of bait reported by FWS researchers aboard the fishing vessel Oregon during a January 1948 visit to the French Frigate Shoals, indicating the necessity for further research into seasonal meteorological effects on the bait fish.

Hugh M. Smith then headed south to the Phoenix Islands, collecting data along the way at hydrographic stations between the French Frigate Shoals and 5°S 172°W, making the last of these observations on 7 February 1950. Her crew found little mortality among the iao in her bait tanks after reaching 5 degrees South, indicating the practicality of transporting them from Hawaii to the equatorial region. After reaching the Phoenix Islands, she conducted a preliminary reconnaissance of Hull Island on 8 February, seeing indications of bait fish in the lagoon and catching five yellowfin offshore, looked for bait in the lagoon at Canton Island on 9–10 February, where she captured 650 pounds (295 kg) of mullet, and then fished for tuna off Canton on 11 February, using the mullet for bait. She caught only 25 tuna, although her crew sighted skipjack tuna and yellowfin tuna off the island and a large school of skipjack in the open ocean 1,100 nautical miles (2,000 km; 1,300 mi) southwest of Honolulu at 10°N 172°W. She also took aboard a United States Weather Bureau observer at Canton Island and gathered meteorological and hydrographic data near the equator. She then proceeded east to the Line Islands, and on 18 February 1950 began another set of observations at hydrographic stations between 5°S 158°W and Oahu as she proceeded north, completing her last observations on 28 February. Despite stormy weather, she took water samples and temperatures at a total of 50 hydrographic stations across the North Equatorial Current, South Equatorial Current, and Equatorial Counter Current during her cruise at depth ranging from the surface to 4,500 feet (1,372 m) to gather data for the oceanographic study of the central Pacific Ocean, which directly affected the growth and behavior of fish. At each station, Hugh M. Smith also took plankton samples between the surface and 600 feet (183 m), both to gather information on the quantity of zooplankton — a food source for fishes — and their correlation with physical and chemical oceanography in the central Pacific and to aid in locating tuna spawning grounds by searching for tuna eggs and larvae. She also engaged in night-light fishing while hove to on hydrographic sections, finding success in catching fishes and squids for use in comparison to the contents of tuna stomachs. She returned to Pearl Harbor on 2 March 1950 after 44 days at sea, bringing back tuna stomachs, sections of vertebrae, and female gonads for the study of dietary habits, growth and age, and sexual maturity.

Hugh M. Smith′s third cruise took place in Hawaiian waters. She tested an experimental type of flag-line fishing gear equipped with buoys that made hooks float at specified depths to allow the investigation of the effect of subsurface temperatures on the vertical distribution of tuna and improve predictions as to the location of the best fishing. She also tested a type of Japanese line-hauling gear that automatically coiled lines that otherwise were coiled by hand, finding the gear worked very well, and measured water temperatures at depths of up to 900 feet (270 m) to correlate water conditions with success in catching fish. She returned to Pearl Harbor on 22 April 1950 after three weeks at sea.

Hugh M. Smith also spent her fourth cruise off Hawaii, departing Pearl Harbor on 10 May 1950 and returning 22 days later on 2 June. During the voyage, she sampled waters within 400 nautical miles (740 km; 460 mi) of Hawaii with fine-meshed nets in a search for tuna eggs and young, finding many eggs and small fish, including small sailfish 0.25 to 0.5 inches (6.4 to 12.7 mm) in length. In addition, she experimented with methods of tagging tuna, tagging 20 skipjack and small yellowfin, and kept three skipjack alive in her live well for the last two days of the cruise. She also engaged in exploratory fishing, catching approximately 750 pounds (340 kg) of bait fish — nehu (a small anchovy), iao, and mosquito fish — and using them to catch 162 skipjack and 82 dolphin fish.

Hugh M. Smith got underway from Pearl Harbor for her fifth cruise on 16 June 1950. She first visited the Northwestern Hawaiian Islands to search for bait and found iao and piha (Spratelloides delicatulus) in all localities but never in quantities that warranted bait fishing. She then embarked on fulfilling her cruise's primary objective of repeating the hydrographic and planktonic observations across the equatorial and counter equatorial currents between Hawaii and 5 degrees South she had made in January and February during her second cruise, allowing a comparison of observations made in midwinter with those of midsummer to shed light on the seasonal changes in the positions and speeds of the currents and in upwellings. She made observations at 51 hydrographic stations during the outbound and return legs of her cruise, taking water samples from as deep as 4,000 meters (13,123 ft) to determine levels of salinity, dissolved oxygen, and inorganic phosphates and producing 502 bathythermograms. At each station, she also made a plankton haul between the surface and a depth of 200 meters (656 ft) and engaged in night-light fishing while hove to at the stations to collect specimens of fish and invertebrates useful for comparison in analyzing the contents of tuna stomachs.

In mid-July 1950, after completing her outbound observations and before beginning observations on her return voyage, Hugh M. Smith visited Canton Island, where she had greater success in catching bait, hauling in 500 pounds (227 kg) of mullet from the lagoon. She used the mullet and frozen herring for seven days of longline fishing for tuna off Canton with excellent results, enjoying over twice the rate of catch experienced using similar equipment off Hawaii. She brought in 73 yellowfin of 50 to 190 pounds (23 to 86 kg) each, four albacore of 30 to 40 pounds (14 to 18 kg) each, and four white marlin and two black marlin of 250 to 400 pounds (110 to 180 kg) each, which the FWS said indicated great potential for commercial fishing operations in central Pacific waters. Her crew weighed and measured the length of many of the fish they caught; made more detailed morphometric assessments of some fish; and collected tuna stomachs, vertebral sections, and female gonads for the study of tuna diets, age and growth, and sexual maturity. Hugh M. Smith completed her seven-week cruise with her return to Pearl Harbor on 6 August 1950.

On 18 August 1950, Hugh M. Smith put back to sea for her sixth cruise, a three-week stint in Hawaiian waters to survey tuna eggs and fry as part of a study of the life cycle and habits of tuna, as well as to test a bronze high-speed depressor — a kite-like device —designed to counteract the tendency of towed scientific gear and trolling lures attached to ordinary weights to rise when towed at speeds greater than 4 miles per hour (3.5 kn; 6.4 km/h). It proved able to remain at a depth of 150 feet (46 m) at speeds as high as 8 to 9 knots (15 to 17 km/h; 9.2 to 10.4 mph) and she used it in trolling operations between 1 and 5 September, albeit without success in catching fish. She also conducted night-light fishing and recorded sightings of tuna schools. She concluded the cruise on 5 September 1950.

Hugh M. Smith′s seventh cruise was devoted to exploratory fishing for yellowfin from Hawaii south through the Line Islands at 60-nautical-mile (110 km; 69 mi) intervals to ascertain the relationship of yellowfin abundance to the North Equatorial Current, Equatorial Counter Current, and South Equatorial Current, and test the theory that the apparent relationship of the amount of food organisms to the currents also indicated the number of yellowfin present. Plans also called for her to investigate the relationship of land masses to tuna abundance and of the effect of differing water temperatures at different depths on the vertical distribution of tuna. She departed Pearl Harbor on 18 October 1950 and began fishing at 12°28′N 158°04′W, proceeding southward to Christmas Island. She then fished from Palmyra Island to a point 330 nautical miles (611 km; 380 mi) to its east, and finally from 00°01′N 160°29′W northward to 10 degrees 45 minutes North. During 27 days of longlining at depths of 400 to 500 feet (122 to 152 m) she caught 216 tuna, almost entirely yellowfin but also some bigeye tuna and skipjack, and collected stomachs and ovaries from many of them and made morphometric assessments of some to gather data for identifying different races of yellowfin, bigeye, and skipjack. She also collected plankton from the upper 200 meters (656 ft) of the water column to correlate tuna food with the presence of tuna. Although Hugh M. Smith made good catches near Palmyra, Fanning, and Christmas Islands and her best catch about 80 nautical miles (148 km; 92 mi) southwest of Fanning, her crew found that hydrographic conditions had more to do with the abundance of tuna than the proximity of land masses and that fishing was poor between 13 degrees North and 7 degrees North, generally good between 7 degrees North and 3 degrees North, and then fairly good south to the equator. Hugh M. Smith also spent a day each at Christmas and Fanning Islands searching for bait with little success, but caught 500 pounds (230 kg) of mullet at Palmyra to use for bait. She returned to Pearl Harbor on 30 November 1950.

==== 1951 ====
By the beginning of 1951, FWS scientists had determined that the equatorial divergence of currents played a key role in fertilizing the waters of the central Pacific, so Hugh M. Smith got underway for her eighth cruise on 14 January 1951 bound for the waters between Hawaii and the Samoan Islands with a primary goal of making hydrographic observations to investigate equatorial currents farther south than previously to examine their effect on the equatorial divergence. During her cruise, she focused on the area between 1 degree North and 7 degrees North — an area found during previous cruises to have a particular abundance of nutrients, plankton, and fish — measuring salinity, dissolved oxygen, chemical nutrients, and the abundance of plankton at thirteen different depths ranging from the surface to 3,700 feet (1,128 m) at 104 stations. The data she gathered assisted FWS scientists in assessing whether the zone moved north and south seasonally, affecting the seasonal abundance of tuna in particular areas. She also recorded 54 sightings of schools of tuna, conducted 460 hours of surface trolling — during which she caught only 25 tuna — collected fish specimens for research purposes, and cooperated with the U.S. Weather Bureau in making meteorological observations four times daily. She returned to Pearl Harbor on 14 March 1951 after a 9,000-nautical-mile (16,700 km; 10,400 mi), 60-day cruise.

Hugh M. Smith departed Pearl Harbor on 5 May 1951 for an exploratory fishing cruise during which she scouted for bait at Laysan Island and Pearl and Hermes Reef in the Northwestern Hawaiian Islands, at Johnston Atoll, at Fanning Island in the Line Islands, and at Gardner Island in the Phoenix Islands; tested bait fishing for tuna off Midway Atoll, Lisianski Island, and the French Frigate Shoals in the Northwestern Hawaiian Islands, off Palmyra Atoll and Christmas Island in the Line Islands, and off Canton Island in the Phoenix Islands; and tested live-bait fishing for tuna off the Line Islands (including Kingman Reef, Palmyra Atoll, Washington Island, Fanning Island, Christmas Island, and Jarvis Island) and off the Phoenix Islands (including Canton Island, Gardner Island, Hull Island, Sydney Island, and Birnie Island). She captured 1,135 buckets of bait, 570 of them at Midway and only small amounts at the French Frigate Shoals, Palmyra Atoll, Christmas Island, and Canton Island. The bait included flagtails, iao (Atherina insularum), several species of goatfish, and several species of mullet, and Hugh M. Smith′s crew reported all but the mullet to be excellent bait for tuna. Generally fishing within 15 nautical miles (28 km; 17 mi) of land, Hugh M. Smith attempted fishing on 51 schools of yellowfin, catching 31 tons and finding the best fishing off the Line Islands. She also hauled in 40 additional yellowfin, two skipjack, 25 wahoo, 12 kawakawa, 10 ulua, three rainbow runners, and three mahi-mahi by trolling, enjoying her best trolling success off Kingman Reef. Hugh M. Smith recorded biological data from her catch and throughout her cruise took plankton samples and made hydrographic observations through the use of bathythermograph and recording thermograph equipment. She returned to Pearl Harbor on 7 July 1951.

In July 1951, Hugh M. Smith conducted a hydrographic cruise — her 10th — to gather data on ocean current systems and water chemistry in Hawaiian waters in support of research into the reasons for seasonal changes in the abundance of yellowfin and skipjack in the central Pacific generally and particularly off the Hawaiian Islands. She returned to Pearl Harbor on 31 July 1951 after completing 33 hydrographic stations.

On 20 August 1951, Hugh M. Smith began another exploratory fishing cruise to test a theory that tuna should be abundant in an area of the central Pacific where the ocean circulation system creates a convergence north of the equator and south of the Equatorial Counter Current, concentrating small sea life that tuna prey upon. Finding the convergence between 1 degree North and 6 degrees North, Hugh M. Smith longlined there between Christmas Island and a point 440 nautical miles (815 km; 506 mi) to the east for 15 days up to 20 September 1951, averaging 13 tuna of a combined 1,600 pounds (726 kg) per day per 100 hooks, more than four times the average rate of three fish per 100 hooks per day commercial fisherman achieved off Hawaii and the Caroline Islands. Then, while about 360 nautical miles (670 km; 410 mi) east of Christmas Island, she caught tuna (yellowfin and skipjack) in the vicinity of 02°00′N 151°20′W at a rate of 29 fish per 100 hooks per day, which the FWS described in the October 1951 edition of Commercial Fisheries Review as "probably the most phenomenal catch of tuna ever taken by longlining." Following this achievement, she continued exploratory fishing operations to as far south as 5 degrees South before beginning her homeward voyage, during which she made an oceanographic survey. She also used Nansen bottles to collect water samples at depths of up to a half-mile (805 m) for chemical analysis. She returned to Pearl Harbor on 6 October 1951 having averaged nine tuna per 100 hooks per day of fishing for her entire cruise. In its preliminary findings, the FWS concluded that Hugh M. Smith′s catch indicated that yellowfin were concentrated in the convergence zone as predicted, although bigeye tuna appeared to be more uniformly distributed throughout the areas Hugh M. Smith fished. The FWS said that Hugh M. Smith′s cruise appeared to demonstrate that commercial fishing vessels from Hawaii could enjoy great success in tuna fishing about 1,000 nautical miles (1,900 km; 1,200 mi) south of the Hawaiian Islands, only a third of the distance California fishing vessels traveled to get to their fishing grounds.

For her twelfth cruise, Hugh M. Smith operated in Hawaiian waters to gather data on the hydrography, chemistry, and zooplankton of the area and their apparent correlation to the abundance of tuna, allowing a seasonal comparison with similar data collected in July 1951. She also collected tuna eggs and larvae and estimated the abundance of tuna by monitoring the waters for tuna schools and seabird behavior related to the presence of tuna. She departed Pearl Harbor on 23 October 1951 and returned on 3 November. She then made a brief cruise — her 13th — to take part in gear-testing and gear-standardization experiments before entering drydock on 25 November 1951 for an annual overhaul.

==== 1952 ====
Early in 1952, Hugh M. Smith embarked on an exploratory fishing cruise — her 14th FWS cruise — to the equatorial waters south of Hawaii in which she had discovered large stocks of unfished tuna in September 1951, with a goal of testing whether tuna remained there in abundance during the winter. She worked closely with US FWS John R. Manning, which longlined in the same area. After catching several tons of large yellowfin near the equator, Hugh M. Smith returned to Pearl Harbor on 13 March 1952 after six weeks at sea.

Hugh M. Smith got back underway on 21 May 1952 for her 15th cruise, heading for equatorial waters to gather physical, chemical, and biological data . Operating along longitude 140 degrees West from 7 degrees North to 9 degrees North, she made observations of currents, water temperatures, chemical nutrients, phytoplankton, zooplankton, and forage organisms at 62 stations according to a schedule under which she visited a given section of stations four times in three weeks so as to detect the rate and degree of change occurring at each station during her cruise. She returned to Pearl Harbor on 1 July 1952, then later that month set out on her 16th cruise, a hydrographic cruise she made in conjunction with longlining operations by John R. Manning. She made special observations of the surface and subsurface currents near the equator and of the vertical distribution of zooplankton there with respect to the thermocline. Data she collected confirmed a previously suspected lack of transverse circulation. She returned to Pearl Harbor on 29 August 1952 after 38 days at sea.

Poor skipjack catches by commercial fishing vessels off Hawaii in 1952 were a sharp contrast to a very successful skipjack season during the summer of 1951, prompting the FWS to send Hugh M. Smith out on a 10-day hydrographic cruise in Hawaiian waters in September 1952 to gather physical, chemical, and biological data for comparison to similar data from 1951 to determine whether environmental changes had caused the change in skipjack abundance. While making observations at various stations off the main Hawaiian Islands, she confirmed a paucity of fish, sighting relatively few tuna and having little success while trolling. After completing her observations she returned to Pearl Harbor on 15 September 1952.

==== 1953 ====
Hugh M. Smith′s first cruise of 1953 — her 19th in FWS service — was to the Line Islands in company with the Hawaii commercial fishing boat Tradewind. Tradewind longlined for tuna with live bait — mostly mullet (Mugil longimanus), scarce at Palmyra Atoll but abundant at Christmas and Fanning Islands — and caught 14 tons of yellowfin and two tons of market fish, mostly papio of the genus Caranx. While Tradewind′s catch was not outstanding, Hugh M. Smith — which provided Tradewind with fuel and ice in addition to conducting oceanographic surveys and exploratory fishing — had excellent results with experimental longlining, hauling in 8 tons of yellowfin (which she later landed at Kauai for canning) at a rate of 19 fish per hundred hooks a day even though her focus was on studying the distribution of tuna rather than on maximizing her catch. Although the expedition found few tuna near the surface, the cruise indicated an abundance of tuna at subsurface levels. The two vessels completed their one-month trip with their return to Hawaii on 12 February 1953.

Hugh M. Smith spent the remainder of 1953 in Hawaiian waters as she continued the FWS's investigation of the abundance of skipjack off Hawaii at various times of the year to better inform commercial fishermen of the best areas to fish at different times of year. Departing Pearl Harbor on 25 February 1953 for her 20th FWS cruise, she gathered hydrographic and biological data at 56 stations around the Hawaiian Islands before returning on 4 April 1953. Plans called for her to conduct a similar major cruise during the summer of 1953 to allow a seasonal comparison of environmental data to shed light on physical, chemical, and biological effects on the distribution of skipjack. She made the summer observations during her 21st cruise, covering an 86,000-square-mile (223,000 km^{2}) area around the Hawaiian Islands while making observations at 69 stations and updating the Hawaii commercial fishing fleet on skipjack sightings with twice-daily shortwave radio reports. She returned to Pearl Harbor on 28 August 1953 after a voyage of 2,500 nautical miles (4,630 km; 2,880 mi).

Hugh M. Smith′s 22nd cruise, a three-week trip that ended on 22 September 1953, was devoted to scouting for skipjack in four locations 240 nautical miles (440 km; 280 mi) north and east of Oahu and nine locations as far as 360 nautical miles (670 km; 410 mi) south and west of the island. She found fewer schools of skipjack north of Oahu than to the south, but those to the north were within 60 nautical miles (110 km; 69 mi) of the island, while those to the south were 80 nautical miles (150 km; 92 mi) west of Kailua-Kona on the island of Hawaii and as far as 300 nautical miles (560 km; 350 mi) from Oahu. Many of the fish were too far out to sea for the Hawaii commercial fleet to reach them, reinforcing the FWS view that further development of the Hawaii fishing industry would require larger and better-equipped commercial fishing vessels. On one occasion, she sighted a very large school of 20-pound (9.1 kg) skipjack actively feeding on mackerel scad 280 nautical miles (520 km; 320 mi) west of Barbers Point, Oahu; of a size encountered only once in every five or six years in Hawaiian waters, the school demonstrated that skipjack still existed in abundance in Hawaiian waters and, although Hugh M. Smith had run out of live bait, she managed to catch 1,400 pounds (640 kg) of skipjack from the school using cut bait. She also experimented during her cruise on three schools of skipjack with visual and chemical attractants made of macaroni and agar strips and treated with anchovy or skipjack extract and aluminum powder, but the fish did not respond to the attractants.

Hugh M. Smith again scouted for tuna in Hawaiian waters on her 23rd cruise, a two-week voyage she concluded with her return to Pearl Harbor on 27 October 1953. She spent 13 days searching two areas off Oahu — one extending 300 nautical miles (560 km; 350 mi) south and 250 nautical miles (460 km; 290 mi) west of the island and the other 250 nautical miles (460 km; 290 mi) to the north — and sighted 30 schools of skipjack. She found only two schools north of Oahu, but sighted schools as far as 300 nautical miles (560 km; 350 mi) to the south, albeit not in the numbers there that she had in September 1953. Overall, however, her cruise found an abundance of tuna, especially in an area 110 nautical miles (200 km; 130 mi) south of Oahu and in an eddy 80 nautical miles (150 km; 92 mi) west of the island of Hawaii, although the FWS again noted that the greatest numbers of tuna lay beyond the range of the Hawaii commercial fishing fleet. As she had in September 1953, Hugh M. Smith tested visual and chemical attractants developed jointly with the University of Hawaii, but again had no success with them. The attractants also failed to interest fish during her 24th cruise, during which she searched at 13 stations including one in the lee of Oahu near Pearl Harbor, one 30 nautical miles (56 km; 35 mi) south of Kaʻula, and stations to the north and east of Oahu and up to 250 nautical miles (460 km; 290 mi) west and southwest of the island. She reported the skipjack population in Hawaiian waters to be at a seasonal winter low. She also collected hydrographic data and returned to Pearl Harbor on 1 December 1953 after 30 days at sea.

==== 1954 ====
In 1954, Hugh M. Smith shifted to a new focus as the FWS sought information on the largely unexplored albacore fishing grounds of the North Pacific Ocean to the north and east of Hawaii. To compliment an exploratory fishing cruise US FWS John R. Manning made in the area, Hugh M. Smith conducted a 53-day hydrographic cruise — her 25th FWS cruise — in the North Pacific in early 1954. She occupied 89 hydrographic stations, at each of which she took water samples for chemical analysis at 13 different depths ranging from the surface to 4,000 feet (1,219 m), took bathythermograph readings, and made plankton tows from the surface to a depth of 600 feet (183 m) to sample zooplankton. She took additional bathythermograph readings in between the stations, gathering data on the subsurface temperature structure of the region. She also used an underway current meter to measure surface currents. It was the most thorough oceanographic study of the area ever made up to that time, completing the FWS survey of the area begun by John R. Manning. Hugh M. Smith returned to Pearl Harbor on 17 March 1954.

Hugh M. Smith devoted her 26th cruise to scouting for skipjack in Hawaiian waters. She spent a month at sea, scouting on 23 days and operating within an 800-nautical-mile (1,500 km; 920 mi) radius of the Hawaiian Islands. She found few signs of tuna during four days she spent searching north of Oahu and none at all in the lee of Lanai or at a station about 550 nautical miles (1,020 km; 630 mi) southwest of Oahu. Otherwise, she found significant evidence of skipjack to the southwest of Oahu out to a distance of 840 nautical miles (1,560 km; 970 mi) from the island in the vicinity of Johnston Island, and to the west of Oahu as far out as 720 nautical miles (1,330 km; 830 mi). During her voyage, she also sighted a long set of tuna longlines — apparently set to catch bigeye tuna — set by Japanese fishermen 840 nautical miles (1,560 km; 970 mi) southwest of Oahu and 300 nautical miles (560 km; 350 mi) south of Johnston Island. She collected hydrographic, chemistry, and plankton data at 19 stations and made frequent bathythermograph readings during her cruise, which she concluded with her return to Pearl Harbor on 19 June 1954.

==== 1955 ====
Early in January 1955, Hugh M. Smith embarked on her 27th FWS cruise. She first visited the Northwestern Hawaiian Islands to survey Laysan Island and Midway Atoll for bait fish to see if bait fish resources there could allow an expansion of the Hawaii skipjack fishing industry; she found few bait fish at Laysan, but promising numbers at Midway. She also counted rare Hawaiian monk seals at both locations, finding them numerous enough to raise hopes that they were not headed for extinction. She then explored the waters of the North Pacific between 30 degrees North and 35 degrees North about 600 to 1,000 nautical miles (1,100 to 1,900 km; 690 to 1,150 mi) northwest and north of Hawaii to search for potential fishing grounds for albacore. Covering 6,500 nautical miles (12,000 km; 7,500 mi) of the central North Pacific, she gathered hydrographic data including bathythermograph readings and made plankton hauls at 72 stations, conducted evening trawls at 23 stations, trolled during daylight, and recorded sightings of seabirds and marine mammals. The data she collected suggested that conditions in the area were favorable for albacore to occur in abundance. She returned to Pearl Harbor on 21 February 1955 after a month and a half at sea.

In March 1955, Hugh M. Smith began a one-month cruise in Hawaiian waters to scout for skipjack and continue a program of tagging skipjacks prior to the summer fishing season in the hope of gathering data via the catching of tagged fish by the Hawaii commercial fishing fleet during the summer of 1955. In 17 days of scouting and fishing during her cruise, she tagged 107 skipjack, bringing the total of fish tagged by the FWS since the summer of 1954 to 285. She found the most promising skipjack schools more than 35 nautical miles (65 km; 40 mi) from land in the waters south of Oahu, Molokai, and Lanai. The data she gathered added to the FWS's understanding of the seasonal movements of skipjack and ability to advise the Hawaii fishing industry on where to fish for skipjack in the winter months, when they became scarce in waters fished during the summer. She also ran her recording thermograph continuously and took bathythermograph readings whenever possible. She concluded her cruise — her 28th for the FWS — on 8 April 1955.

For her 29th FWS cruise, Hugh M. Smith conducted exploratory fishing for albacore in the central North Pacific north and northeast of Hawaii while US FWS John R. Manning simultaneously conducted a similar cruise to the north and northwest of Hawaii and the California Department of Fish and Game research vessel N. B. Scofield cooperated with the FWS by fishing for albacore off the United States West Coast. Hugh M. Smith′s primary objective was to determine if albacore were present in commercially important quantities in the area in the early summer and to compare their population patterns in early summer with those noted during the winter in previous cruises. Departing Pearl Harbor on 2 May 1955, she fished with longline gear at 30 locations — also taking salinity samples and lowering a Secchi disk to observe water turbidity at each station — as far as 45 degrees North and engaged in intensive trolling while traveling between longline stations. She also ran her recording thermograph throughout the voyage, made plankton tows, observed saury during night-light operations, and made bathythermograph casts. Although she caught 71 bigeye tuna, a skipjack, a yellowfin, a striped marlin, two shortbill spearfish, 160 lancetfish, 216 blue sharks, eight mako sharks, five mackerel sharks, 23 mahi-mahi, three moonfish, a wahoo, and a leatherback turtle, she did not catch a single albacore with longline gear. She caught one albacore at 28°56′N 139°07′W and five mahi-mahi in 1,597 line-hours of trolling. She tagged some of the tunas she caught, including the lone albacore, and collected female gonads from other tunas; took morphometrics measurements of some of the tunas and sharks; and made daily weather reports to the United States Coast Guard. During her homeward voyage, she found a significant concentration of bigeye tuna about 700 nautical miles (1,300 km; 810 mi) northeast of Hawaii, but her haul of only one albacore — similar to the experience of John R. Manning, which also had little success in finding albacore during her simultaneous cruise to Hugh M. Smith′s west — contrasted sharply with much larger numbers of albacore found in the area during the fall of 1954 and winter of 1954–1955. Hugh M. Smith returned to Pearl Harbor on 14 June 1955 after a 6,000-nautical-mile (11,000 km; 6,900 mi), 43-day cruise.

Hugh M. Smith′s 30th cruise was a six-week affair in which she participated in Operation Norpac, a joint oceanographic investigation of the North Pacific Ocean also involving other vessels from POFI, the Scripps Institution of Oceanography, the University of Washington, the Pacific Oceanographic Group of Canada, and various Japanese agencies. Departing Pearl Harbor on 15 July 1955, she occupied 79 stations in the North Pacific between 25 degrees North and 50 degrees North and between 155 degrees West and 180 degrees West, gathering data from the surface to a depth of 8,000 feet (2,438 m) and conducting successful plankton tows. The FWS viewed the data she gathered as invaluable to the scientific understanding of the effect of midsummer conditions in the North Pacific on meteorology and on the distribution of albacore and salmon. Other than flying fish in the southern part of the region, she sighted only four schools of fish, including salmon, yellowfin, and sauries. Trolling during daylight hours, she caught eight albacore, a skipjack, and 10 mahi-mahi. She also encountered numerous whales (mostly sperm whales) and porpoises. She returned to Pearl Harbor on 28 August 1955.

Hugh M. Smith got underway from Pearl Harbor on 27 September 1955 for her 31st cruise, devoted to investigating the fertility of the eastern tropical Pacific Ocean between Hawaii and Mexico as part of an ongoing series of cruises involving vessels of the FWS and American private institutions and from Canada and Japan devoted to studying physical oceanography, marine biology, and other scientific disciplines over broad areas of the Pacific. She operated over an area larger than the continental United States, and her activities included 746 bathythermograph casts, some of which demonstrated little latitudinal variation in current boundaries, contrary to expectations; daily plankton tows to a depth of 200 meters (656 ft) made in combination with water-color and Secchi disc observations; and sampling of seawater for dissolved oxygen, inorganic phosphate levels, carbon-14 uptake, and plant pigments. She sighted 45 schools of fish, most of them probably of skipjack, but had little success while surface-trolling during daylight, catching only 13 mahimahi, five wahoo, two skipjack, and two black skipjack, although she also caught at least five yellowfin during the hours of darkness. She made morphometric measurements of five yellowfin and two skipjack. She made a brief stop in the Line Islands and spent six days in the Marquesas Islands searching for bait, particularly the sardine Harengula vittata, reportedly abundant there, but found fairly few of the fish. She collected 130 buckets of the sardines in the Marquesas for transportation to Hawaii, but lost most of them overboard during rough weather, although she did dump 20 buckets of them overboard close the leeward shore of Oahu in the hope of introducing them to Hawaiian waters. She returned to Pearl Harbor on 17 December 1955. after 86 days at sea.

==== 1956 ====
Hugh M. Smith′s 32nd cruise was much shorter, lasting only from 1 to 11 February 1956. The cruise was devoted to gathering oceanographic data around Oahu, and Hugh M. Smith made observations at 45 stations surrounding the island. At each station she made a bathythermograph cast; took surface water samples to determine salinity and phosphate levels; and collected plankton at three different levels — 0 to 60 meters (0 to 197 ft), 70 to 130 meters (230 to 427 ft), and 140 to 200 meters (459 to 656 ft) — and at the first station made two additional collections from 0 to 200 meters (0 to 656 ft).

On 2 March 1956, Hugh M. Smith set out from Pearl Harbor on her 33rd cruise to collect data on the oceanography and biology of a significant upwelling in equatorial waters 1,000 nautical miles (1,900 km; 1,200 mi) south of Hawaii. The upwelling brought fertilizing chemicals from the depths of the ocean to sunlit surface waters, feeding the small fish and squid which in turn provided food for tuna. Operating along a 1,000-nautical-mile (1,900 km; 1,200 mi) north-south strip of ocean that straddles the equator along 140 degrees West latitude from about 12 degrees North to 5 degrees South, she gathered data on water speeds, chemistry, and temperatures, the direction of currents, and the types and abundance of plankton. She found the upwelling to be more significant and plankton levels to be significantly richer in the area than noticed during previous cruises. Her embarked scientists made two special studies at the equator and at 1 degree North to ascertain the speed at which water was moving outward from the upwelling. The FWS hoped that the data she collected would help scientists assess where a drifting mass of fertile water would be when it became a good feeding ground for tuna, improving the FWS's ability to forecast the location of productive tuna-fishing grounds. Hugh M. Smith also conducted night-light operations at two stations but found few fish, thought to be due to the presence of many squid and oceanic whitetip sharks at all times. While trolling, she caught only two fish, both mahi-mahi, and she sighted only eight schools of fish, three of them identified as skipjack. She returned to port on 1 April 1956.

Hugh M. Smith′s 34th cruise began on 27 April 1956 when she put to sea from Pearl Harbor for a two-month fishing survey as part of the FWS's effort to understand the reasons for fluctuations in the Hawaiian skipjack population from year to year and from locality to locality. She tagged 200 skipjack — some 120 nautical miles (220 km; 140 mi) north of Oahu and some off Oahu and Lanai — both to track skipjack movements and to investigate better tagging methods; she tagged some fish with a standard tag and others with a new type of tag developed by FWS biologists. Her cruise included two scouting trips north of Oahu and one to the south, as well as a search for skipjack in waters adjacent to Oahu, Molokai, and Lanai. She caught 139 skipjack — of which she tagged and released 118 — and while bait-fishing collected 549 buckets of nehu (Encrasicholina purpurea). During the cruise, she made twice-daily shortwave radio reports to local fisherman on the location of skipjack. She also visited a series of oceanographic stations twice each (once between 27 April and 6 May and again between 19 and 29 June 19) to measure water temperatures and collect water samples. She returned to Pearl Harbor on 30 June 1956.

Hugh M. Smith′s 35th cruise had two goals: Continuing the FWS's 18-month monitoring study of skipjack distribution off Hawaii and participation in EQUAPAC, an international oceanographic study of the equatorial waters of the Pacific between the Philippine Islands and 135 degrees West longitude. Departing Pearl Harbor on 1 August 1956, she visited 45 stations around Oahu as part of the skipjack study before proceeding south to participate in EQUAPAC. For EQUAPAC, operating between Hawaii and just north of 20 degrees South, she visited 79 oceanographic stations and conducted bathythermograph casts, zooplankton tows, and pelagic trawl hauls, all as part of developing an understanding of water circulation is the vicinity of the Marquesas Islands and the Tuamotu Archipelago and identifying potentially productive fisheries in those waters. Her findings suggested that the abundance of plankton was at least as great and sometimes as much as 50 percent larger at night than during daylight hours, and that plankton volume decreased rapidly south of the equator. She sighted 60 schools of tuna during her cruise. She returned to Pearl Harbor on 5 October 1956.

Hugh M. Smith′s 36th cruise took place in Hawaiian waters, where she conducted plankton hauls from mid-October to early November 1956 in support of a study of zooplankton density in the vicinity of Oahu. Around the time of her return to port, the FWS underwent a sweeping reorganization that took effect on 6 November 1956 in which it was renamed the United States Fish and Wildlife Service (USFWS) and was divided into two major new bureaus, the Bureau of Sport Fisheries and Wildlife and the Bureau of Commercial Fisheries (BCF). Seagoing vessels such as Hugh M. Smith came under the control of the BCF.

Hugh M. Smith closed out 1956 with her 37th cruise, made at the request of the Chief of Naval Research, who asked for an oceanographic survey of the waters around Eniwetok Atoll. POFI, the Office of Naval Research, and the Scripps Institution of Oceanography collaborated in executing the cruise. She departed Pearl Harbor on 17 November 1956 and while in the waters around Eniwetok gathered hydrographic and biological data at 26 hydrographic, 11 underwater camera, and two current stations via bottom cores, zooplankton hauls, phytoplankton samples, carbon-14 determinations, trawl hauls, night-light collections, bathythermograph casts, phosphate sampling, and continuous operation of her fathometer and recording thermograph. She returned to Pearl Harbor on 23 December 1956. Her biological findings indicated a low level of fisheries productivity in the Eniwetok region, and the USFWS reported this to the Office of Naval Research.

==== 1957 ====
Early in 1957, Hugh M. Smith was further involved in USFWS studies of the potential for both bait fishing and tuna fishing in the vicinity of the Marquesas Islands and the Tuamotu Archipelago via a “task force” approach involving all three POFI vessels. While US FWS John R. Manning longlined for deep-swimming tuna and US FWS Charles H. Gilbert scouted the islands and atolls of French Polynesia for bait fish in early 1957, Hugh M. Smith departed Pearl Harbor on 11 January 1957 for her 38th cruise, an oceanographic cruise southward along 130 degrees West longitude to study water circulation in the region. During her cruise, she suffered a breakdown of her main drive shaft 3,600 nautical miles (6,700 km; 4,100 mi) southeast of Hawaii in the vicinity of 13°S 130°W. She drifted 300 nautical miles (560 km; 350 mi) over the next two weeks while awaiting assistance, and her 16-man crew took advantage of the situation to study the Southeast Pacific Gyral by making daily hydrographic casts to a depth of 4,000 feet (1,219 m) to gather data on water temperature and chemistry and by longlining for deep-swimming tuna. After the U.S. Coast Guard seagoing buoy tender USCGC Balsam (WLB-62) arrived from Honolulu with spare parts during February, Hugh M. Smith effected repairs and resumed her scheduled scientific program, which included the use of carbon-14 to determine the productivity of marine algae, net hauls to capture zooplankton, and special plankton hauls to gather fish larvae to help determine the distribution of young tuna. She also took samples from patches of discolored yellow water 10 nautical miles (19 km; 12 mi) wide she encountered 2,400 nautical miles (4,400 km; 2,800 mi) southeast of Honolulu for laboratory analysis, her embarked scientific team suspecting they might be similar to “red tides” caused by minute marine organisms off California and Florida. She sighted 48 schools of tuna about 1,800 nautical miles (3,300 km; 2,100 mi) south of Hawaii. She returned to Pearl Harbor on 26 March 1957 — remaining at sea nine days beyond her originally scheduled 17 March return date so that she could complete her scientific activities delayed by her mechanical breakdown — after 11 weeks at sea, during which she travelled 10,000 nautical miles (19,000 km; 12,000 mi) and gathered physical, chemical, and biological oceanographic information over a 2,000,000-square-mile (5,200,000 km^{2}) area of the south-central Pacific Ocean.

From 19 April to 30 May 1957, Hugh M. Smith conducted her 39th cruise, during which she used an improved tag which allowed tagging at greater distances from commercial fishing grounds to tag and release 615 skipjack in Hawaiian waters between Oahu and the French Frigate Shoals, completing a series of three tagging voyages off Hawaii by POFI vessels and bringing the number of skipjack tagged by the USFWS during the 1957 season to 2,000. The USFWS hoped that the tagging of fish south of the usual fishing grounds of the Hawaii commercial fishing fleet would help USFWS scientists understand when and how skipjack moved into the fishing grounds from more remote areas. During 18 days of scouting for and catching bait, Hugh M. Smith caught 584 buckets of iao (Pranesus insularum) and nehu (Stolephorus purpureus), and over 21 days of scouting and fishing for tuna she sighted 42 schools of skipjack and 91 unidentified schools and hauled in 713 skipjack and a few yellowfin and frigate tuna, finding small skipjack in abundance but fewer large skipjack. She also made environmental surveys in the vicinity of Oahu.

Hugh M. Smith′s 40th cruise was devoted to the Northeastern Pacific Albacore Study (NEPAS), a concentrated investigation of the waters off Washington, Oregon, and California that began a study of the distribution of albacore off the United States West Coast to examine the hypothesis that albacore migrated away from the coast to the mid-Pacific each autumn, then returned each spring, moving northward as waters warmed during the summer, and then repeating the cycle. The fisheries agencies of Washington, Oregon, and California all contributed to planning NEPAS via the Albacore Steering Committee of the Pacific Marine Fisheries Commission and also provided observers on the vessels involved. The POFI director described the nine-vessel force taking part — Hugh M. Smith, US FWS John R. Manning, and seven chartered commercial fishing boats from the U.S. West Coast — as the largest fleet ever assembled to investigate the still-mysterious movements of albacore during the summer in the fishing grounds of the Eastern Pacific. The survey took in a broad swath of the northeastern Pacific from north and east of Hawaii to the U.S. West Coast, with especially intensive coverage of a 350-nautical-mile (650 km; 400 mi) swath of ocean along the coast between the Columbia River and Southern California, from 47 degrees to 35 degrees North. NEPAS began with a preliminary reconnaissance by John R. Manning, which departed Pearl Harbor on 11 June 1957 and began exploratory fishing, and Hugh M. Smith, which put to sea on 1 July 1957 to begin gathering oceanographic data along albacore migration routes. Between 2 and 8 July, Hugh M. Smith ran a line of oceanographic stations between Oahu and 38°35′N 143°28′W, after which she conducted a trolling and oceanographic survey from the area along longitude 142 degrees 30 minutes West between 40 degrees and 46 degrees North to the U.S. West Coast. After calling at Astoria, Oregon, from 18 to 22 July, she got back underway for the second phase of NEPAS, in which the seven chartered fishing boats joined the survey and they and the two USFWS vessels mounted a coordinated exploratory fishing effort, each vessel covering a specific zone from the coast out to 350 nautical miles (650 km; 400 mi) along parallel tracks. Except for 15–26 August, when she called at Oakland, California, for repairs, Hugh M. Smith acted as the command vessel for the operation, also making oceanographic observations and trolling, and after storm damage and mechanical failures forced two chartered vessels to withdraw from NEPAS, her assigned area was modified to partially cover the area they missed. The nine vessels combined to catch 1,004 albacore, of which they tagged and released 458. From 29 August through 5 September, Hugh M. Smith ran a line of oceanographic stations between 33°36′N 123°30′W and Oahu. Hugh M. Smith′s oceanographic activities during her cruise included bathythermograph casts, water color and Secchi disc observations, water samples for salinity, phosphate, and dissolved oxygen levels, plankton tows, and night-light observations of sauries. Her return to Pearl Harbor on 5 September 1957 completed the survey, which found albacore widely distributed throughout the study area east of 145 degrees West longitude.

Hugh M. Smith took part in the International Geophysical Year (IGY) — an international scientific project studying 11 Earth sciences that lasted from 1 July 1957 to 31 December 31, 1958, with 67 countries participating scientifically — during her 41st cruise, occupying two IGY oceanographic stations off Oahu on 16–17 September and again on 29–30 October 1957. In between her IGY activities, she operated in the Marshall Islands between 28 September and 19 October 1957, where she occupied 16 oceanographic stations off Eniwetok, giving her a total of 20 stations for her cruise. She made 21 zooplankton tows, three of them off Eniwetok dedicated to gathering larval tuna for electrophoretic and serological study. At Eniwetok, she also conducted a detailed bathymetric survey, tracked parachute drogues offshore, occupied seismological stations, and occupied night-light fishing stations offshore and in the lagoon, the night-light stations yielding poor results. She conducted surface trolling during her outbound and return voyages between Oahu and Eniwetok, but caught no fish, although she sighted 14 schools of tuna during the cruise. She also occupied an IGY oceanographic station at 21°10′18″N 158°19′00″W on 26–27 November 1957 during her 42nd cruise.

==== 1958 ====
On 3 January 1958, Hugh M. Smith got underway for her 43rd cruise, the fifth of a series of seven USFWS cruises to investigate the tuna and bait-fish resources of the Marquesas Islands and the surrounding waters of the region, which had undeveloped tuna resources. Equidistant from Southern California and Hawaii, the Marquesas fishing grounds were of immediate interest to the U.S. West Coast's long-range tuna clipper fleet and of potential interest to the Hawaii fishing industry if it developed a longer-range fishing fleet. While fishing around 10 of the 11 Marquesas Islands and in more distant waters of the region — which she fished in an 1,800-nautical-mile (3,300 km; 2,100 mi) cross-shaped pattern radiating outward from the Marquesas — Hugh M. Smith found a greater abundance of tuna than noted in any previous cruise. She sighted 76 schools of tuna around the islands, most of them skipjack of 3 to 6 pounds (1.4 to 2.7 kg), and 74 schools farther out to sea, where skipjack closer to the islands were in the 3-to-6-pound (1.4 to 2.7 kg) range and those at the seaward end of her fishing pattern in the same 16-to-29-pound (7.3 to 13.2 kg) range that made up most of the Hawaiian skipjack fishery. She captured, tagged, and released over 300 skipjack, and also collected data on salinity, water temperature and chemistry, plankton, and tuna eggs and larvae on the fishing grounds. She spent 12 days in the Marquesas surveying the availability of Marquesan sardinellas (Sardinella marquesensis) for use as bait, and she captured 10,500 sardinella for transportation back to Hawaii, where POFI scientists released them off ʻEwa Beach, Oahu — the largest of the four releases of Marquesan sardinella in Hawaiian waters by POFI scientists since 1955 — in the hope that they would establish themselves in Hawaii and make up for the chronic shortage of nehu (Encrasicholina purpurea ) that limited the accessibility of live bait to the Hawaiian fishing industry. During her cruise, she also collected miscellaneous fishes of scientific interest, the most notable being a rare 6-inch (15 cm) shark and a sea moth. She returned to Pearl Harbor on 25 February 1958 after 53 days at sea.

Hugh M. Smith′s next major cruise was her 45th, which began on 20 March 1958 with her departure from Pearl Harbor. She spent three weeks of her cruise working with the Scripps Institution of Oceanography research vessel MV Horizon to conduct the first real study of the Pacific Equatorial Undercurrent — known as the Cromwell Current after the June 1958 death of POFI oceanographer Townsend Cromwell, who discovered it in 1952 — as part of the IGY program. The two vessels investigated the current in an area on the equator about 1,500 nautical miles (2,800 km; 1,700 mi) southeast of Honolulu and for several hundred miles both north and south of the equator. They employed a new instrument and a new method to study the current: Allowing themselves to drift, they lowered a current meter over the side which transmitted an electrical signal to the vessel via a conductor cable which indicated the apparent direction and speed of drift; after correcting for the ship's drift, established through observation of a fixed reference point created either by placing deep parachute drogues at a depth of 3,000 feet (914 m) and attaching them to surface buoys or by anchoring buoys to the seabed in depths of 2.5 to 3 miles (4,000 to 4,800 m), embarked scientists could determine the speed and direction of the current. Upon completion of the study, Hugh M. Smith and Horizon stopped at Tahiti to refuel, then parted company, with Hugh M. Smith heading to the Marquesas Islands for a month of exploratory tuna fishing and bait fish studies, the last of the seven USFWS cruises to study the area's fishery resources. She found that the number of tuna in May and June (autumn in the Southern Hemisphere) had declined from that detected in the Southern Hemisphere summer (January, February, and March), a seasonal pattern matching that observed in the Northern Hemisphere's autumn and summer in Hawaii. She nonetheless sighted 45 schools of tuna in 12 days and captured 563 skipjack, of which she tagged and released 311. She found bait fish — Marquesan sardinella — to be very scarce, a contrast to the summer months, when bait were far more plentiful at the same time that tuna fishing was at its best. While in the Marquesas, she conducted night-light, Secchi disc, and water color observations, and a party she put ashore conducted a special study of sardinella distribution, abundance, and biology and collected 3,000 reef fish and 70 shrimp for transportation to and release in Hawaii. She also conducted plankton hauls and daylight trolling throughout her cruise. She returned to Pearl Harbor on 23 June 1958, completing an 88-day, 10,600-nautical-mile (19,600 km; 12,200 mi) expedition.

For her 46th cruise, Hugh M. Smith returned to the central North Pacific in POFI's ongoing albacore survey. She operated in conjunction with the Seattle-based chartered fishing boat MV Paragon, which conducted exploratory fishing to determine if albacore were present in commercially useful numbers and experimented with gillnetting in mid-ocean, while Hugh M. Smith gathered oceanographic and biological data., Paragon began gillnetting on 27 July 1958 but had disappointing results compared to those of promising albacore surveys in the region during the summers of 1955 and 1956, averaging a catch of only around 1,000 pounds (450 kg) per day and returning to Seattle on 7 September after hauling in only 15 tons of albacore. The data Hugh M. Smith collected indicated that the reason for the decline in albacore was a vast change in environmental conditions, especially a cooling of surface waters that caused albacore to migrate southward. After a 51-day cruise, Hugh M. Smith returned to Hawaii on 9 September 1958. and to a new home port in Kewalo Basin, a commercial fishing harbor in Honolulu where POFI had moved its docking operations from Pearl Harbor in August 1958 while she was at sea.

Hugh M. Smith departed Kewalo Basin on 9 October 1958 to test a new mid-water trawl during her 47th cruise, the first use of such a trawl in the central Pacific. Proceeding to a few degrees south of the equator before heading home, she sighted few schools of tuna during her cruise but caught significant numbers of young tuna as well as large numbers of tuna forage fish and rare fish with the trawl. She also collected oceanographic data on the extension of the California Current southeast of Hawaii and the Cromwell Current in the area. Contrary to expectations, she sighted no tuna schools in the vicinity of the California Current and had to cancel plans for live-bait fishing for tuna and stomach sampling there, and unfavorable weather prevented her from using the new trawl in the area. She returned to Honolulu on 11 November 1958.

==== 1959 ====
In early January 1959, Hugh M. Smith began her next major cruise — her 50th — to continue the ongoing survey of patterns of skipjack abundance in Hawaiian waters. Operating in an area bounded by 13 degrees North and 23 degrees North and by 147 degrees West and 170 degrees West longitude that extended several hundred miles to the east, south, and west of the Hawaiian Islands, she sighted few schools of skipjack, and none of the larger skipjack that appeared seasonally around Hawaii, suggesting that such skipjack migrated to an undiscovered area at least 800 nautical miles (1,500 km; 920 mi) from the Hawaiian Islands. The temperature and salinity readings she took found a large area of warmer, low-salinity water had intruded into the area from farther south, thought by oceanographers to be an uncommon event but leaving only a few patches of water with conditions skipjack preferred. She returned to Kewalo Basin on 11 February 1959 after five weeks at sea.

On 3 March 1959, Hugh M. Smith got back underway for her 51st cruise. She devoted her cruise to studying the southern extension of the California Current and its relationship to the occurrence of skipjack and other marine organisms in the Hawaiian Islands area. She took salinity readings every 30 nautical miles (56 km; 35 mi) during her cruise and discovered that salinity levels had increased east of the islands since her January–February cruise and continued to increase as she revisited the area during this cruise, while those west of the islands had decreased. She also scouted for skipjack at 32 locations, finding none in the area north of 20 degrees North and east of 155 degrees West longitude but observing schools near land northeast of Oahu and south of Nīhoa and farther out to sea south of Nīhoa. She returned to Honolulu on 6 April 1959.

Hugh M. Smith departed Honolulu on 28 April 1959 to begin her 52nd and final USFWS cruise, tasked with tracing the movements of albacore in the North Pacific between Hawaii and Southern California east of 125 degrees West longitude in cooperation with the California Department of Fish and Game research vessel N. B. Scofield. Hugh M. Smith fished at 32 stations and made photometer, Secchi disc, Forel color, and salinity observations, took carbon-14 and phosphate samples, made plankton hauls and bathythermograph casts, and issued weather reports four times daily. She also ran her thermograph throughout the cruise. The fishing results achieved by the two vessels indicated that no albacore were present in the survey area and that the spring migration of albacore took place north of it. Reassigned to the California office of the USFWS Bureau of Commercial Fisheries, Hugh M. Smith completed the cruise with her arrival at San Diego, California, on 19 June 1959.

== Later career ==
The California office of the Bureau of Commercial Fisheries promptly leased Hugh M. Smith to the Scripps Institution of Oceanography, which took control of her on 23 June 1959. Scripps operated her on research duties related to oceanography and marine biology until 4 November 1963, when Scripps returned her to the USFWS. The USFWS transferred her to the U.S. Navy in 1963. The U.S. Navy struck her from the Naval Vessel Register.

At the request of Governor of American Samoa H. Rex Lee, Hugh M. Smith was sent to American Samoa, a former Scripps captain commanding her during her delivery voyage from California to American Samoa. She operated in American Samoa until 1965, when she was transferred to the Philippine Merchant Marine Academy at Pago Pago, American Samoa. Renamed RPLS (Republic of the Philippines Laboratory Ship) Habagat (“South Wind”), she proceeded to the Philippines, where she served as a “training laboratory ship” until she capsized during a severe storm while docked at Manila sometime in the late 1970s.

== See also ==
- NOAA ships and aircraft
