= US FWS John R. Manning =

U.S. fisheries research vessel

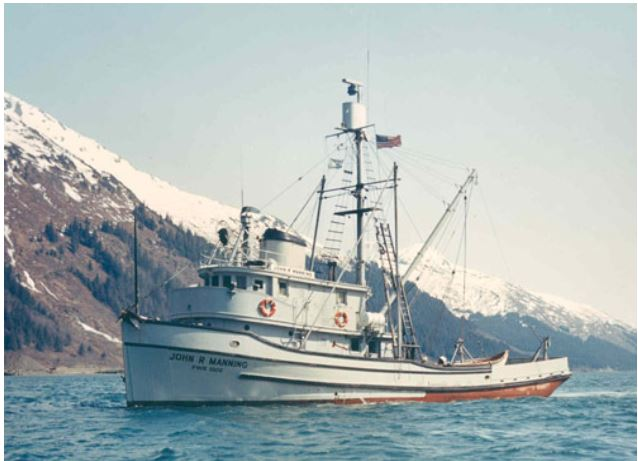

U.S. Fish and Wildlife Service
- Name: US FWS John R. Manning
- Namesake: John Ruel Manning (1897–1939), pioneer in fishery product utilization research
- Operator: United States Fish and Wildlife Service
- Awarded: 27 June 1949
- Builder: Pacific Boatbuilding Company, Tacoma, Washington
- Launched: early 1950
- Commissioned: early 1950
- Decommissioned: 1969
- Home port: Pearl Harbor, Hawaii 1950-1956; Juneau, Alaska 1956-1969
- Identification: FWS 1002; IMO number: 7308047
- Fate: Sold 1969

United States
- Name: MV R. B. Hendrickson
- Acquired: 1969
- Identification: IMO number: 7308047
- Fate: Sank 13 May 1979

General characteristics
- Type: Fisheries research ship
- Tonnage: 550 GRT
- Displacement: 237 tons
- Length: 86.5 ft (26.4 m)
- Beam: 22 ft 6 in (6.9 m) or 24.5 ft (7.5 m) (sources disagree)
- Draft: 8.5 ft (2.6 m)
- Depth: 12 ft 8 in (3.9 m)
- Installed power: 2 x diesel generators
- Propulsion: 6-cylinder 320 hp (240 kW) Washington Iron Works diesel engine
- Speed: 7.75 knots (14 km/h) or 9 knots (17 km/h) (cruising) (sources disagree)
- Range: 8,000 nmi (15,000 km)
- Notes: SOURCES

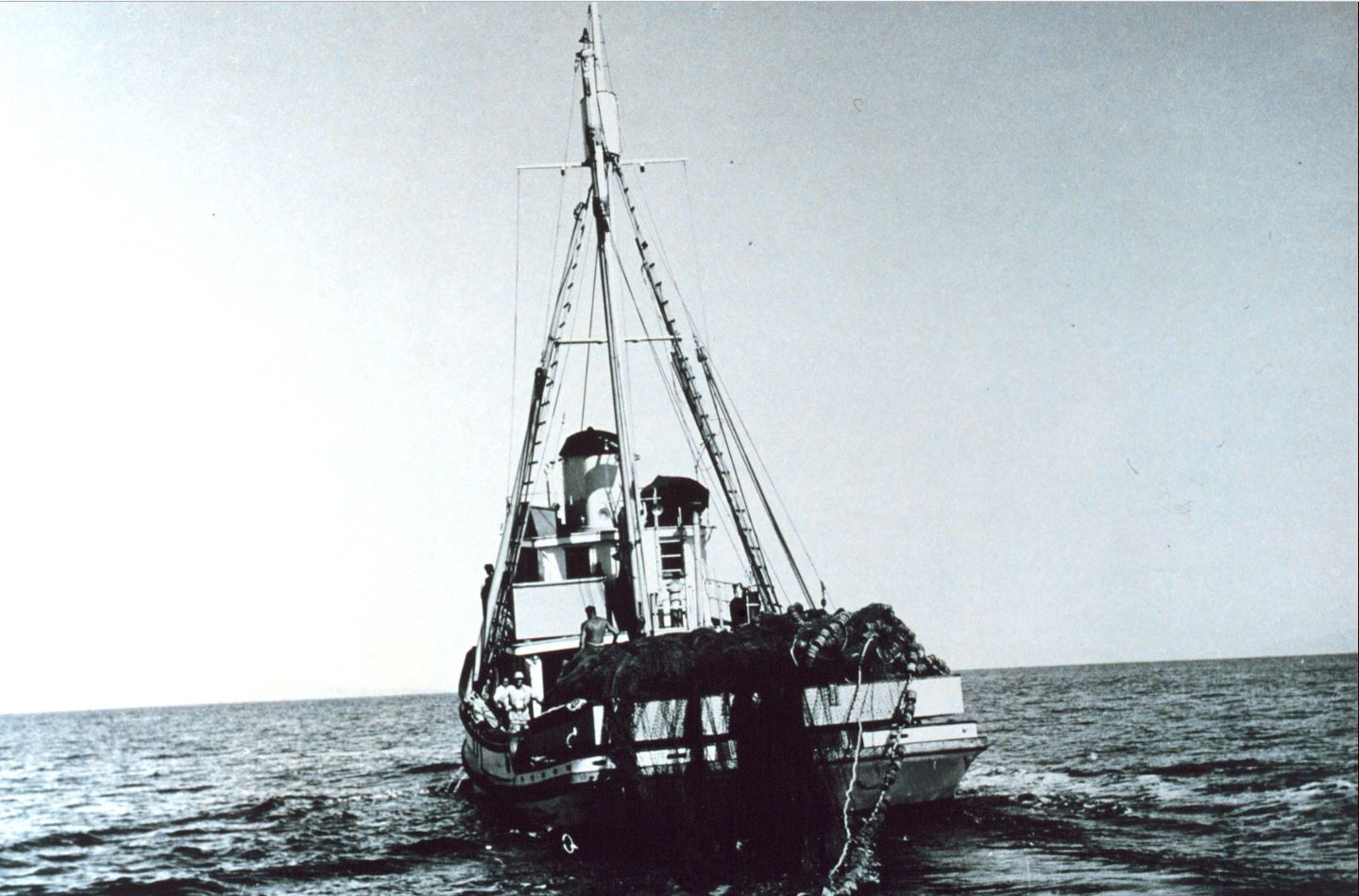
John R. Manning starting a purse seine set in the tropical Pacific Ocean, ca. 1950

US FWS John R. Manning (FWS 1002) was an American fisheries research vessel in commission in the fleet of the United States Fish and Wildlife Service from 1950 to 1969. She explored the Pacific Ocean in search of commercially valuable populations of fish and shellfish. After the end of her Fish and Wildlife Service career, she operated as the commercial fishing vessel MV R. B. Hendrickson until she sank in 1979.

== Origin ==
In August 1947, the United States Congress authorized a new "Pacific Ocean Fishery Program" calling for the "investigation, exploration, and development of the high seas fisheries of the Territories and Island Possessions [of the United States] and intervening areas in the tropical and subtropical Pacific Ocean." The United States Department of the Interior's Fish and Wildlife Service (which in 1956 would become the United States Fish and Wildlife Service) was responsible for carrying out the program, which was to be overseen by a new office, Pacific Ocean Fishery Investigations (POFI), under the direction of Oscar Elton Sette. In addition to the construction of the Pacific Ocean Fisheries Laboratory at the University of Hawaii in Honolulu, Territory of Hawaii, and the development of a Fish and Wildlife Service (FWS) docking and warehouse site at Pearl Harbor, Hawaii, the Congress funded the conversion or construction of three ocean-going vessels to support POFI's work. During 1949 and 1950, these three vessels joined the Fish and Wildlife Service fleet as US FWS Henry O'Malley, US FWS Hugh M. Smith, and US FWS John R. Manning.

== Construction and commissioning ==
Unlike Henry O’Malley and Hugh M. Smith, which were converted patrol boats the FWS acquired from the United States Navy, John R. Manning was purpose-built for the FWS as a fisheries research vessel. The firm of Pillsbury & Martignoni designed her as a purse-seiner capable of long-distance deployments to remote areas with limited refueling options. The FWS awarded a contract for her construction to the Pacific Boatbuilding Company in Tacoma, Washington, on 27 June 1949. Launched in early 1950, she was delivered to the FWS shortly thereafter. She was commissioned early in 1950 as US FWS John R. Manning (FWS 1002), named for John Ruel Manning (1897–1939), a United States Bureau of Fisheries chemist and technologist who pioneered the concept of fishery products utilization research.

== Technical characteristics ==
John R. Manning was specially designed for exploratory and experimental fishing. She was constructed along the lines of a typical United States West Coast commercial purse-seiner, but with a number of significant differences, including a longer range and the inclusion of live bait tanks — installed to allow her to experiment with new ways of purse-seining — and a large number of gurdies (mechanical cranks used to haul fishing lines) to facilitate her experimentation with new purse-seining techniques. In addition to commercial-scale purse-seining, she was outfitted for longline fishing and deep-water trolling.

An 86-foot-6-inch (26.37 m) long motor vessel, John R. Manning had a wooden hull, a 320-horsepower (240 kW) Washington Iron Works diesel engine, and two diesel generators for auxiliary power. She had a cruising speed of 7.75 knots (14.4 km/h; 8.9 mph) or 9 knots (17 km/h; 10 mph) (sources disagree), and her large fuel capacity gave her a cruising range of 8,000 nautical miles (15,000 km), a longer range than commercial fishing boats of her size made necessary by the vast size — 13,000,000 square miles (34,000,000 km^{2}) — of the ocean area in which she was to operate and the limited refueling options in the area. She had a brine refrigeration system capable of preserving 30 short tons (27 t) of tuna for later laboratory analysis ashore, and during construction her brine wells were increased to four from the originally planned two. She also was equipped to take surface and subsurface water temperature readings. Her navigational aids were modern by the standards of 1950 and included LORAN, a radio direction finder, a 250-watt radio telephone and radio telegraph transmitter, and an automatic steering pilot.

== Service history ==
=== Fish and Wildlife Service ===
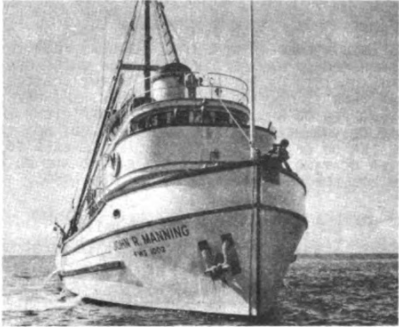
Starboard bow view of US FWS John R. Manning, from Commercial Fisheries Review, November 1950 Supplement

After her commissioning, John R. Manning departed Seattle, Washington, on 21 February 1950, called at San Pedro, California, then proceeded to her home port, Pearl Harbor, Hawaii, from which she operated in support of the FWS's Pacific Oceanic Fishery Investigations (POFI). She began her FWS career with a shakedown and training period off Hawaii before departing for a cruise to the Line Islands. POFI tasked her to search for commercially viable populations of fish around the Hawaiian Islands and in the waters of the Pacific Ocean and the Philippine Sea between Hawaii and Palau in cooperation with the United States West Coast fishing industry, as well as to test alternative capture methods because of the lack of live bait in the open ocean. Accordingly, she conducted exploratory tuna fishing operations around the Hawaiian Islands and experimented with the use of purse-seining for skipjack tuna around Hawaii and of gillnetting around the Line Islands and the Phoenix Islands. Her crew reported disappointing results with purse-seining and gillnetting, but also that the use of modified longline gear yielded a 40 percent increase in the take of yellowfin tuna. Fisheries scientists aboard John R. Manning studied the diets of albacore, yellowfin tuna, and big-eyed tuna by examining the contents of their stomachs.

During her early years in the tropical Pacific, John R. Manning captured a number of rare or unusual fishes. These included:

- two juvenile scalloped ribbonfish (then identified as Trachypterus iris but later as Zu cristatus) from a depth of about 16,200 feet (4,938 meters) at 008°32′N 150°12′W on 4 May 1953;
- two female cookiecutter sharks (Isistius brasiliensis) – known from the tropical Atlantic, Indian, and western Pacific Oceans but rarely recorded previously in the central or eastern Pacific – one from a depth of about 12,000 feet (3,700 m) at 4°47′N 161°04′W on 23 May 1954 and one from a depth of about 6,000 feet (1,800 m) at 002°09′N 158°14′W on 2 June 1954;
- a unicorn crestfish (Eumecichthys fiski) – a very rare fish caught on only a few occasions previously and then mostly in waters off Japan – from a depth of about 5,400 feet (1,600 m) at 003°04′N 159°13′W on 1 June 1954; and
- a juvenile deal fish (Desmodema polystictum), also known as a polka-dot ribbonfish or spotted ribbonfish – poorly understood at the time and known mostly from specimens washed up on shore and only rarely caught in nets – from a depth of about 12,000 feet (3,700 m) at 004°41′N 159°53′W on 25 May 1954.

Under the direction of oceanographer Townsend Cromwell, John R. Manning also contributed to improved understanding of sea temperatures in the Marshall Islands area, joining the FWS vessel US FWS Hugh M. Smith in the first half of 1950 in taking the only bathythermograph readings of water temperatures ever taken in the area other than those taken by the United States Navy destroyers USS Barton, USS Laffey, and USS O'Brien and hydrographic survey ship USS John Blish during Operation Crossroads in 1946.

In 1954, John R. Manning began a new assignment, exploring the waters of the North Pacific Ocean between Hawaii and Alaska for commercially valuable Pacific albacore populations. While longlining off Hawaii during these operations in 1955, she captured a marlin weighing 1,500 pounds (680 kg) that had a 5-foot (1.5 m), 157-pound (71 kg) yellowfin tuna in its stomach that it had recently swallowed headfirst. At the time, a debate existed as to whether billfish such as marlins used their elongated snouts to spear their prey; the yellowfin had two holes in its body consistent with the marlin having speared it, providing clear evidence of this behavior.

In 1956, the Fish and Wildlife Service underwent a major reorganization in which it was renamed the United States Fish and Wildlife Service (USFWS) and its oceangoing vessels were placed under its new Bureau of Commercial Fisheries (BCF). That year, John R. Manning's home port changed from Pearl Harbor to Juneau, Alaska. In 1957, she began operating in support of the Northeastern Pacific Albacore Survey, operating in the Pacific Ocean along the west coast of North America to investigate populations of tuna and their movements.

John R. Manning underwent an overhaul at Seattle in early 1963, during which shipyard workers discovered a substantial dry rot problem which required the replacement of entire planks and timbers. After completion of these repairs, she had an eventful year in 1963, engaging in exploratory scallop fishing in the Gulf of Alaska and later carrying scientists on an expedition to tag king crabs around Kodiak Island. She also took part in five search-and-rescue actions during 1963, and in four of them rescued about 20 people from six different vessels in distress.

During most of the 1960s, John R. Manning conducted halibut and other bottomfish surveys and fisheries patrols, including observation of foreign fishing activities in the Bering Sea. Her patrols took place mostly in the Gulf of Alaska, and a 1964 BCF publication on foreign fishing activities in the Bering Sea and Gulf of Alaska reported very negatively on her patrol work, describing her crew as "inept" and the vessel herself as "inadequate," concluding that she was "severely lacking as a law enforcement vessel" and that her "very presence among the most modern fishing fleets in the world is damaging to US prestige," and recommended her replacement.

Despite the negative report, John R. Manning remained in service. In 1967, she supported the BCF's Exploratory Fishing and Gear Research (EF&GR) program by assessing the mid-water populations in the Bering Sea of Alaskan pink shrimp, using echo-sounding transects and test drags with a Cobb pelagic trawl to locate schools of Alaskan pink shrimp at night well above the sea floor in inshore waters. In 1968 and 1969, she conducted exploratory surveys of scallop populations in Southeast Alaska for EF&GR.

The USFWS decommissioned John R. Manning in 1969. The newly refurbished BCF research vessel US FWS Oregon replaced her.

=== Later career ===
The USFWS sold John R. Manning in 1969, and she became the commercial fishing vessel R. B. Hendrickson, with the official number 524645. On 13 May 1979, R. B. Hendrickson ran aground and sank.

== See also ==
- NOAA ships and aircraft
