= Frank T. Bell =

U.S. Commissioner of Fisheries

United States Commissioner of Fish and Fisheries
- In office April 15, 1933 – March 21, 1939
- President: Franklin D. Roosevelt
- Preceded by: Henry O'Malley
- Succeeded by: none

Personal details
- Born: September 21, 1883 Joplin, Missouri, US
- Died: October 6, 1970 (aged 87) Ephrata, Washington, US
- Party: Democratic Party
- Occupation: Owner and operator of hotels and restaurants

Frank T. Bell (September 21, 1883 – October 6, 1970) led the United States Bureau of Fisheries as the eighth and last United States Commissioner of Fish and Fisheries. He served in the position from 1933 to 1939. As commissioner, he had success in making the Bureau more efficient and in increasing cooperation on fishery issues among United States government agencies and between them and U.S. state governments.

== Early and personal life ==
Franklin Thomas Bell was born in Joplin, Missouri, on September 21, 1883, the fifth of the 11 children of William Layfette Bell and Amie Lee Bell née Farrar. He later moved to the State of Washington, where he married Bertha May Hill, a native of Ephrata, Washington, in Douglas, Washington, on December 22, 1908. The couple had two children, Mabel B. Bell and Victor Franklin Bell.

When not engaged in political activities or in government office, Bell pursued a career as an owner and operator of hotels and restaurants. He was a member of the Methodist Church, held memberships in the Rotary Club, the Benevolent and Protective Order of Elks, and the Odd Fellows, and was an avid hunter and fisherman.

== Political activities ==
While residing in his wife's home town of Ephrata, Bell became involved in local politics in the Democratic Party. From 1919 to 1923, he was the treasurer of Grant County, Washington. From 1922 to 1933, he served as private secretary to United States Senator Clarence Dill of Washington. Bell promoted the construction of the Grand Coulee Dam and other United States government dam projects.

== U.S. Commissioner of Fish and Fisheries ==
Bell exhibited an interest in nature conservation and demonstrated talent both as a business executive and as an organizer. On April 14, 1933 – when his residence was listed as Seattle, Washington – he was appointed United States Commissioner of Fish and Fisheries. He took office upon the departure of his predecessor, Henry O'Malley, on April 15, 1933.

In his capacity as commissioner, Bell oversaw the United States Bureau of Fisheries. Although he had no experience in the commercial fishing industry and had never been involved in any sports fishing organization, the Bureau of Fisheries in the May 1, 1933, issue of the Fisheries Service Bulletin described this as a strength, allowing him to take an unbiased approach to addressing fisheries issues brought before him as commissioner while applying his executive leadership talents to the position. He began his tenure vowing to continue the Bureau's fisheries science and other scientific work to the greatest extent possible given the reduced budgets available during the Great Depression, keep as many of the Bureau's personnel employed as possible, and conduct a comprehensive review of the Bureau's fishery regulations in time for any necessary changes to be made for the 1934 season.

In furtherance of the goals of President Franklin D. Roosevelt’s New Deal, Bell soon after becoming commissioner took action to increase U.S. Government management of the salmon fishery in the Territory of Alaska, a dominant component of Alaska's economy over which the Bureau of Fisheries had jurisdiction. Bell believed that the Bureau needed to consider the socioeconomic effects of salmon-fishing regulations in addition to regulating the harvest of salmon. He surveyed the major salmon districts in Alaska and determined that the Bureau's regulations perpetuated the dominance of fish canneries in the Alaska salmon fishery without taking into account the fishing interests of local people. He therefore reduced the number of floating fish traps permitted and loosened regulations to permit a greater use of net-type fishing gear as a way of promoting private fishing in Alaska.

At a meeting of fish and game departments from throughout the United States that Bell called in St. Louis, Missouri, on April 23, 1934, participants formed the National Planning Council of Commercial and Game Fish Commissioners, a first-of-its-kind organization intended to avoid the long-existing duplication of effort between the Bureau of Fisheries and the fish and game departments of the U.S. states. The diversity of issues in different regions of the country prevented the new council from achieving its original goal of developing a single fishery program for the entire United States, but the council did establish five zones, with each zone overseen by a chairman. The representatives of each state in a given zone and the chairman of that zone were to meet at least once every three months, and the five zone chairmen were to meet with the Commissioner of Fish and Fisheries twice a year, all with a goal of ensuring that fishery resources were managed in a coordinated manner among the states and in harmony with efforts of the U.S., Bureau of Fisheries, including the regulation of commercial fishing, the stocking of fish to avoid overstocking in some areas and a lack of stocking in others, and addressing pollution problems and other conservation issues in rivers from the standpoint of each river system as whole, without limiting the scope of policies to state boundaries. At its fourth annual meeting on April 28, 1938, the council abolished the original five zones, which had proven too large and unwieldy, and replaced them with 11 new, smaller zones that were more convenient for the states.

On March 19, 1935, the Bureau of Fisheries under Bell's leadership entered into an agreement with the United States Forest Service and the United States Department of Agriculture′s Bureau of Biological Survey to coordinate the stream improvement activities of the Bureau of Fisheries and Forest Service and ensure their compatibility with game requirements in forested areas determined by the Biological Survey. The American Fisheries Society elected Bell as its president for a one-year term in the final session of its annual convention on September 11, 1935.

A conference in Washington, D.C. in 1927 to address issues related to the American shad fishery had resulted in little more than indifference and inaction, so Bell called the first Atlantic States shad conference in Atlantic City, New Jersey, on February 6, 1937, to revitalize the effort by considering ways of restoring and developing the fishery. Attended by the chairman of the United States House Committee on Merchant Marine and Fisheries, Congressman S. Otis Bland of Virginia, and representatives of the Bureau of Fisheries and of representatives of Connecticut, Delaware, Maine, Maryland, New Jersey, New York, North Carolina, Rhode Island, South Carolina, and Virginia, including the commissioners of the National Planning Council of Commercial and Game Fish Commissioners from those states, the conference discussed the biology and propagation of the American shad, regulation of the American shad harvest, and obstructions and pollution affecting the American shad population, and recommended the establishment of a permanent Atlantic Coast Shad Conservation Council as well as increased Bureau of Fisheries scientific investigation of the fishery.

In early November 1937, Bell and other Bureau of Fisheries officials met in Knoxville, Tennessee, with representatives of the Department of Agriculture's Bureau of Biological Survey and the Tennessee Valley Authority (TVA) to discuss issues related to the protection of native wildlife, particularly fish and waterfowl, in the Tennessee River and its drainage basin in the Tennessee Valley from the harmful effects of the TVA's activities in the construction of dams, impoundment of water, and encouragement of manufacturing. During the meeting, the Bureau of Fisheries impressed upon TVA officials that their plans to convert free-flowing streams with clear water into artificial lakes characterized by still water probably would destroy the freshwater mussel population, greatly reduce populations of buffalo fish, carp, catfish, paddlefish, freshwater drum (also known as sheepshead), sturgeon, suckers, and other bottom-feeders, and at least make survival more difficult for species better adapted to still water, such as bass, crappie, pike-perch, and sunfish, all with a potential impact on the local economy, which relied in part on fishing. The Bureau of Fisheries described and recommended a comprehensive fishery management program for the Tennessee Valley to mitigate the impacts of the TVA's programs and ensure the survival of threatened species.

According to the February 1939 edition of the Fisheries Service Bulletin, the Bureau of Fisheries was one of the most efficient U.S. Government agencies during Bell's six-year tenure as commissioner and saw an increase in budgetary appropriations of 67 percent. The Fisheries Service Bulletin listed the following as the Bureau's achievements under Bell's leadership:

- In Alaska, where the Bureau had jurisdiction over fisheries, the salmon fishery produced a yearly high of 8,437,603 cases of fish in 1936 and averaged 6,500,000 cases annually.
- In the Pribilof Islands, where the Bureau was responsible for managing the fur seal herd as well as the welfare of the local Aleut community, the fur seal herd increased by nearly 30 percent, from 1,318,516 to 1,872,438 animals, and 300,000 seal skins were taken in the islands and sold on the Bureau's account.
- Early in his tenure, Bell oversaw the closure of unproductive fish hatcheries as well as the expansion of the Bureau's fish-culture work through the construction or acquisition of 20 new hatcheries. The changes resulted in an all-time annual production record of 8,120,000,000 fish in 1936, exceeding the previous record by well over a billion fish.
- Bell expanded the Bureau's scientific endeavors by instituting investigations of the haddock fishery in the North Atlantic Ocean, the shrimp fishery in the Gulf of Mexico, the American shad fishery along the United States East Coast, and the pilchard fishery – the largest U.S. fishery – along the United States West Coast.
- Bell oversaw an increased role for the Bureau in conservation of the salmon fishery of the Columbia River and fishery management in streams in national forest areas.
- Under Bell's leadership, the Bureau took a role in supporting oyster farmers and harvesters along the U.S. East and West Coasts, providing them with scientific assistance in dealing with pests and predators and instruction in improving farming methods.
- The Bureau played an instrumental role in regulating whaling on the high seas under the terms of the 1937 International Agreement for the Regulation of Whaling.
- In 1938, the Bureau created the Fishery Market News Service, which supported the U.S. commercial fishing industry by collecting and circulating information from widely scattered fisheries centers around the United States on fishery production, receipts, supply and demand, market prices, cold storage holdings, and imports and exports.
- Bell championed cooperation between U.S. Government agencies and between the U.S. Government and state agencies to reduce duplication of effort and encourage broader views of environmental systems that allowed better preservation of management of fishery resources. The creation of the National Planning Council of Commercial and Game Fish Commissioners and the Bureau's work with the Tennessee Valley Authority were particularly notable examples of his approach, and he also led the Bureau in developing cooperative efforts with the National Park Service and Farm Security Administration.

Bell's travels on inspection tours of Bureau of Fisheries facilities took him throughout the continental United States and to the Territory of Alaska, and included visits to the Pribilof Islands and the Territory of Hawaii.

Bell's last official action as commissioner was the creation of a hatchery school to instruct Bureau of Fisheries superintendents and employees in the latest fish-culture techniques. By early 1939, the facility for the first unit of this school was under construction at Leetown, West Virginia.

On January 6, 1939, Bell abruptly announced his resignation. He left the Bureau of Fisheries at the end of January 1939, although his resignation did not become effective officially until March 21, 1939. He was the last Commissioner of Fish and Fisheries; after his departure, Deputy Commissioner Charles E. Jackson served as acting commissioner until the Bureau of Fisheries was abolished on June 30, 1940, when the new Fish and Wildlife Service (which later became the United States Fish and Wildlife Service in 1956) took over its responsibilities, personnel, facilities, and fleet.

== Later activities ==
Bell remained politically active after his departure from the Bureau of Fisheries. He was an alternate delegate from Washington to both the 1948 and 1952 Democratic National Conventions.

== Death ==
Bell died at Ehprata on October 6, 1970. He was buried at Ephrata Cemetery.

Government offices
Preceded by Henry O'Malley	United States Commissioner of Fish and Fisheries; 1933–1939	Succeeded by none
