= US FWS Henry O'Malley =

U.S. fisheries research vessel

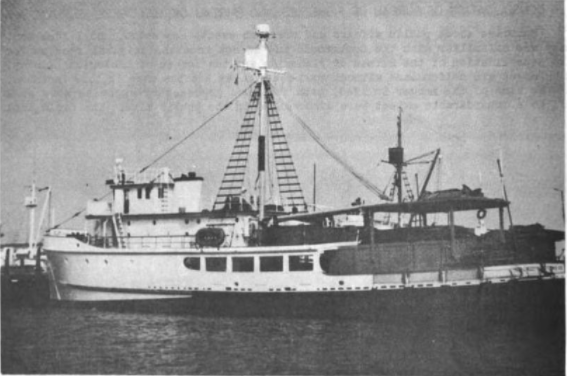
- US FWS Henry O'Malley, from Commercial Fisheries Review, March 1950

United States Navy
- Name: USS YP-646
- Builder: Colberg Boat Works, Stockton, California
- Completed: 1945
- Commissioned: 11 June 1945
- Decommissioned: mid-1946
- Fate: Transferred to Fish and Wildlife Service 26 January 1948

U.S. Fish and Wildlife Service
- Name: US FWS Henry O'Malley
- Namesake: Henry O'Malley (1876–1936), U.S. Commissioner of Fisheries (1922–1933)
- Acquired: 26 January 1948
- Commissioned: 1949
- Home port: Pearl Harbor, Territory of Hawaii
- Fate: Sold 16 February 1951

United States
- Name: MV Santa Rosa
- Owner: Western Boat Building Company (1951); Edward P. Silva (1956); John L. Gomes (1977)
- Home port: San Diego, California (1977)
- Identification: IMO number: 7308475
- Fate: Unregistered as of 1984
- Notes: Derelict as of 1987

General characteristics (as U.S. Navy vessel)
- Type: Patrol vessel
- Displacement: 403 tons
- Length: 117 ft (36 m)

General characteristics (as fisheries research vessel)
- Type: Fisheries research ship
- Tonnage: 550 GRT
- Length: 128 ft (39 m)
- Beam: 29 ft (8.8 m)
- Draft: 15 ft (4.6 m)
- Installed power: 2 x 125-kW diesel–electric generators
- Propulsion: 560 hp (420 kW) diesel engine

General characteristics (as private fishing vessel)
- Type: Fishing vessel
- Tonnage: 386 GRT (1951); 357 GRT (1975); 325 GRT (1977)

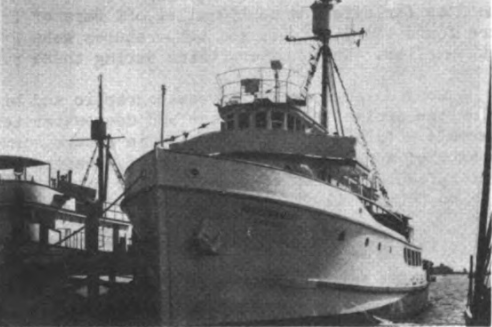
US FWS Henry O'Malley at San Diego, California, before her departure for Honolulu, Hawaii, from Commercial Fisheries Review, November 1949.

US FWS Henry O'Malley was an American fisheries science research vessel in commission from 1949 to 1951 in the fleet of the United States Department of the Interior's Fish and Wildlife Service. She was the first U.S. fisheries science vessel to explore the central Pacific Ocean in search of commercially valuable populations of fish. Her career was cut short by a requirement for cost-prohibitive repairs.

Prior to her time in the Fish and Wildlife Service, the vessel was in commission in the United States Navy as the patrol vessel USS YP-646 from 1945 to 1946. After her Fish and Wildlife Service career ended, she became the private fishing vessel MV Santa Rosa.

== Construction ==
The Colberg Boat Works built the vessel as the U.S. Navy patrol vessel YP-646 at Stockton, California, in 1945. As completed, she was listed as 117 feet (36 m) in length, with a displacement of 403 tons.

== Service history ==
=== U.S. Navy ===
The vessel was commissioned into U.S. Navy service as USS YP-646 on 11 June 1945. She was commissioned during the final summer of World War II. Hostilities soon ended on 15 August 1945, and Japan formally surrendered on 2 September 1945, bringing the war to an end. YP-646 served into the immediate aftermath of the conflict, operating in the Pacific Ocean and the waters of China until she was decommissioned in mid-1946.

=== Fish and Wildlife Service ===
In August 1947, the United States Congress authorized a new "Pacific Ocean Fishery Program" calling for the "investigation, exploration, and development of the high seas fisheries of the Territories and Island Possessions [of the United States] and intervening areas in the tropical and subtropical Pacific Ocean." The United States Department of the Interior's Fish and Wildlife Service (which in 1956 would become the United States Fish and Wildlife Service) was responsible for carrying out the program, which was to be overseen by a new Pacific Ocean Fishery Investigation (POFI) under the direction of Oscar Elton Sette. In addition to the construction of the Pacific Ocean Fisheries Laboratory at the University of Hawaii in Honolulu in the Territory of Hawaii and the development of a Fish and Wildlife Service (FWS) docking and warehouse site at Pearl Harbor, Hawaii, the Congress funded the conversion or construction of three ocean-going vessels to support POFI's work. During 1949 and 1950, these three vessels joined the Fish and Wildlife Service fleet as US FWS Henry O'Malley, US FWS Hugh M. Smith, and US FWS John R. Manning.

==== Acquisition, conversion, and commissioning ====
After YP-646 was reconditioned, the U.S. Navy transferred her to the FWS, which took delivery of her on 26 January 1948. After passing sea trials in which the FWS noted her main engine as running very well, she underwent conversion into a research vessel to support fisheries science investigations, designed to operate as an exploratory fishing vessel. Her conversion was completed on 27 September 1949. The FWS described her as a 128-foot (39 m) long motor vessel, with a beam of 29 feet (8.8 m) and a draft of 15 feet (4.6 m), powered by a 560-horsepower (420 kW) diesel engine, and equipped with two 125-kilowatt diesel-electric generators. She was commissioned as US FWS Henry O'Malley, named for Henry O'Malley (1876–1936), who led the United States Bureau of Fisheries as the Commissioner of Fisheries from 1922 to 1933. She was the first of the three fisheries research vessels the FWS assigned to POFI to enter service.

Henry O'Malley departed San Diego, California, on 6 October 1949 bound for Honolulu, which she reached on 20 October. After her arrival, the manufacture of bait nets and other gear necessary to outfit her for bait fishing and deep trolling began. She moved to Pearl Harbor on 27 November 1949 to load bait.

==== First cruise ====
Henry O'Malley got underway on 28 November 1949 for her first FWS cruise, an 11-day shakedown cruise in the waters of the Hawaiian Islands. Although hampered by bad weather, she tested her equipment — operating her pole-and-line gear and deploying her trolling gear to a depth of 600 feet (180 m) — and trained her crew for research operations before returning to Pearl Harbor on 7 December 1949.

==== Second cruise ====
On 11 January 1950, Henry O'Malley departed Pearl Harbor in an attempt to begin her second FWS cruise and first scientific cruise, heading for the Northwestern Hawaiian Islands to explore the French Frigate Shoals for bait. However, excessive wear on the timing gear of her main engine forced her to abort the voyage and return. After repairs, she again set out from Pearl Harbor on 24 January 1950 to begin the cruise. She conducted exploratory fishing during her outbound voyage, arrived at the French Frigate Shoals on 27 January, and scouted Tern Island and Shark Island for bait the same day. High seas and winds of up to 45 knots (83 km/h; 52 mph) prevented her from conducting any further scientific operations until 5 February, when she looked for bait at Tern Island and East Island. All the bait she collected on both 27 January and 5 February was taken within 50 feet (15 m) of shore in 1 to 6 feet (0.3 to 1.8 m) of water. During her visit to French Frigate Shoals, she also experimented while at anchor with the use of yellow lights to attract fish at night. Bad weather returned on 6 February, so she abandoned further bait collection after only 11 days at French Frigate Shoals and only two days of bait collection and departed that day to begin the next phase of her cruise. It called for her to visit Johnston Island, then operate in the Line Islands before returning to Pearl Harbor on 21 March 1950. However, a main engine failure, again caused by excessive wear on the engine's timing gear, forced her to cut her cruise short, and instead she headed home, conducting exploratory fishing on her way back to Pearl Harbor, which she reached on 10 February. The 19 buckets of live bait she collected — iao (Hepsetia insularum) — did well in her live bait tanks. Some of the bait was studied at the University of Hawaii, while some was dumped into the waters of Pearl Harbor and found to be thriving there five days later.

==== Third cruise ====
After repairs, Henry O'Malley departed Pearl Harbor for her third FWS cruise and second scientific cruise on 16 May 1950. Her main objective was to collect bait at the French Frigate Shoals and then use it to fish for skipjack tuna off both the main Hawaiian Islands and the Northwestern Hawaiian Islands, with an overall goal of developing techniques for the use of United States West Coast-style fishing vessels and equipment in areas of the mid-Pacific Ocean not previously explored by fisheries scientists. During the voyage, she caught only 18 skipjack, her crew finding that her size and relative lack of maneuverability made it difficult to maintain contact with schools of fish. While scouting for tuna, she took bathythermograph readings, and she gathered biological specimens during night-lighting operations. She also collected stomachs, gonads, and vertebrae from and gathered morphometric data on four pole-caught skipjacks, which contributed to scientific understanding of skipjack diets, spawning, growth, and population characteristics. During the cruise, her crew found that hot lava pouring into the sea on the coast of the island of Hawaii during an eruption of the volcano Mauna Loa had killed many fish, whose carcasses had then risen to the surface, and she spent a day collecting the dead fish to examine the contents of their stomachs. She returned to Pearl Harbor on 8 June 1950 after three weeks at sea.

==== Fourth cruise ====
Plans for Henry O'Malley′s next cruise — her fourth in FWS service and third scientific cruise — called for her to conduct exploratory fishing off the Northwestern Hawaiian Islands, where she was to explore the French Frigate Shoals, Laysan Island, Pearl and Hermes Reef, and Midway Atoll for bait. She then was to proceed to the Phoenix Islands, testing the viability of transporting live bait there from the Hawaiian Islands. In the Phoenix Islands, she was to collect additional bait before rendezvousing with Hugh M. Smith and John R. Manning. During the week of 24 July 1950, Henry O'Malley was to team up with John R. Manning and hold fish with the bait she had collected while John R. Manning used purse seining to catch the fish and Hugh M. Smith carried out oceanographic survey work and conducted flag-line fishing operations. Henry O'Malley got underway from Pearl Harbor on 1 July 1950 and, according to plan, collected bait at the French Frigate Shoals and Midway before moving on to the Phoenix Islands, where she gathered more bait in the lagoon at Canton Island, conducted a preliminary bait reconnaissance of Hull Island, and fished for tuna around Canton Island, Birnie Island, and Enderbury Island. However, unfavorable weather and poor fishing conditions prevailed, preventing her from conduct her planned fishing operations in cooperation with John R. Manning. Instead, Henry O'Malley proceeded to the Line Islands, where she visited Kingman Reef and Palmyra Island, spending one morning at each location conducting exploratory fishing for tuna. Throughout her cruise, she conducted surface trolling. She also took subsurface water temperature readings during her outbound and homebound voyages to determine their relationship to the North Equatorial Current, South Equatorial Current, and Equatorial Counter Current and collected yellowfin tuna ovaries, stomachs, and gonads and made morphometric assessments of the fish to determine the existence of different races of yellowfin. However, what the November 1950 edition of the Fish and Wildlife Service publication Commercial Fisheries Review described as "operational difficulties" forced her to cut her cruise short, and she proceeded to Pearl Harbor, where she arrived on 30 August 1950, two weeks earlier than planned.

==== Decommissioning and sale ====
Henry O'Malley underwent extensive repairs, but she failed her post-repair sea trials. Deeming her unseaworthy, and determining that additional repairs needed to make her ready for research operations were cost-prohibitive, the Fish and Wildlife Service decommissioned Henry O'Malley. It offered her for sale in early February 1951, and she was sold at San Pedro, California, on 16 February 1951 for USD$127,501.

=== Later career ===
The Western Boat Building Company of Tacoma, Washington, registered the vessel as the 386-gross register ton (GRT) fishing boat MV Santa Rosa in 1951. She was assigned the official number 261691. She was listed as sold in 1952. In 1956, Edward P. Silva of San Diego, California, registered her under the same name and with the same tonnage, but with the radio call sign WD5312. In 1975, her tonnage was listed as 357 GRT.

In 1977, John L. Gomes of La Jolla, California, registered her as a 325-GRT fishing boat, again with the radio call sign WD5312, still named MV Santa Rosa, and with her home port at San Diego. Santa Rosa dropped out of the registration rolls in 1984 and was listed as lying derelict at the Port of San Diego as of 1987.

== See also ==
- NOAA ships and aircraft
