= Encrasicholina pseudoheteroloba =

Short-head anchovy

Conservation status
- Least Concern (IUCN 3.1)

Scientific classification
- Kingdom: Animalia
- Phylum: Chordata
- Class: Actinopterygii
- Order: Clupeiformes
- Family: Engraulidae
- Genus: Encrasicholina
- Species: E. pseudoheteroloba

Binomial name
- Encrasicholina pseudoheteroloba (Hardenberg, 1933)

Species of fish

Encrasicholina pseudoheteroloba, the short-head anchovy, is a species of ray-finned fish in the family Engraulidae.
