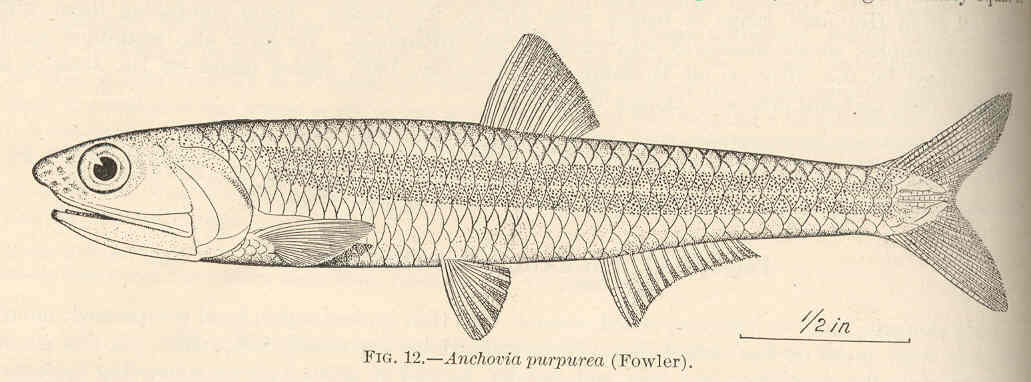
- Encrasicholina purpurea

Scientific classification
- Kingdom: Animalia
- Phylum: Chordata
- Class: Actinopterygii
- Order: Clupeiformes
- Family: Engraulidae
- Subfamily: Engraulinae
- Genus: Encrasicholina; Fowler, 1938

Type species
- Encrasicholina punctifer Fowler, 1938

= Encrasicholina =

Genus of ray-finned fishes

Encrasicholina is a genus of ray-finned fish in the family Engraulidae. They are widespread in the Indo-Pacific.

== Species ==
There are currently 11 recognized species in this genus:

- Encrasicholina auster Hata & Motomura, 2017 (Fiji anchovy)
- Encrasicholina gloria Hata & Motomura, 2016 (Red Sea anchovy)
- Encrasicholina heteroloba (Rüppell, 1837) (Devis' anchovy)
- Encrasicholina integra Hata & Motomura, 2020 (Papuan anchovy)
- Encrasicholina intermedia Hata & Motomura, 2016 (Shiner anchovy)
- Encrasicholina macrocephala Hata & Motomura, 2015 (Largehead anchovy)
- Encrasicholina oligobranchus (Wongratana, 1983) (Philippine anchovy)
- Encrasicholina pseudoheteroloba (Hardenberg, 1933) (Short-head anchovy)
- Encrasicholina punctifer Fowler, 1938 (Buccaneer anchovy)
- Encrasicholina purpurea (Fowler, 1900) (Hawaiian anchovy)
- Encrasicholina sigma Hata & Motomura, 2020 (Makassar anchovy)
