= Encrasicholina macrocephala =

Largehead anchovy

Conservation status
- Data Deficient (IUCN 3.1)

Scientific classification
- Kingdom: Animalia
- Phylum: Chordata
- Class: Actinopterygii
- Order: Clupeiformes
- Family: Engraulidae
- Genus: Encrasicholina
- Species: E. macrocephala

Binomial name
- Encrasicholina macrocephala Hata & Motomura, 2015

Species of fish

Encrasicholina macrocephala, the largehead anchovy, is a species of ray-finned fish in the family Engraulidae. It is found in the western Indian Ocean.

== Size ==
This species reaches a length of 5.6 cm (2.2 in).
