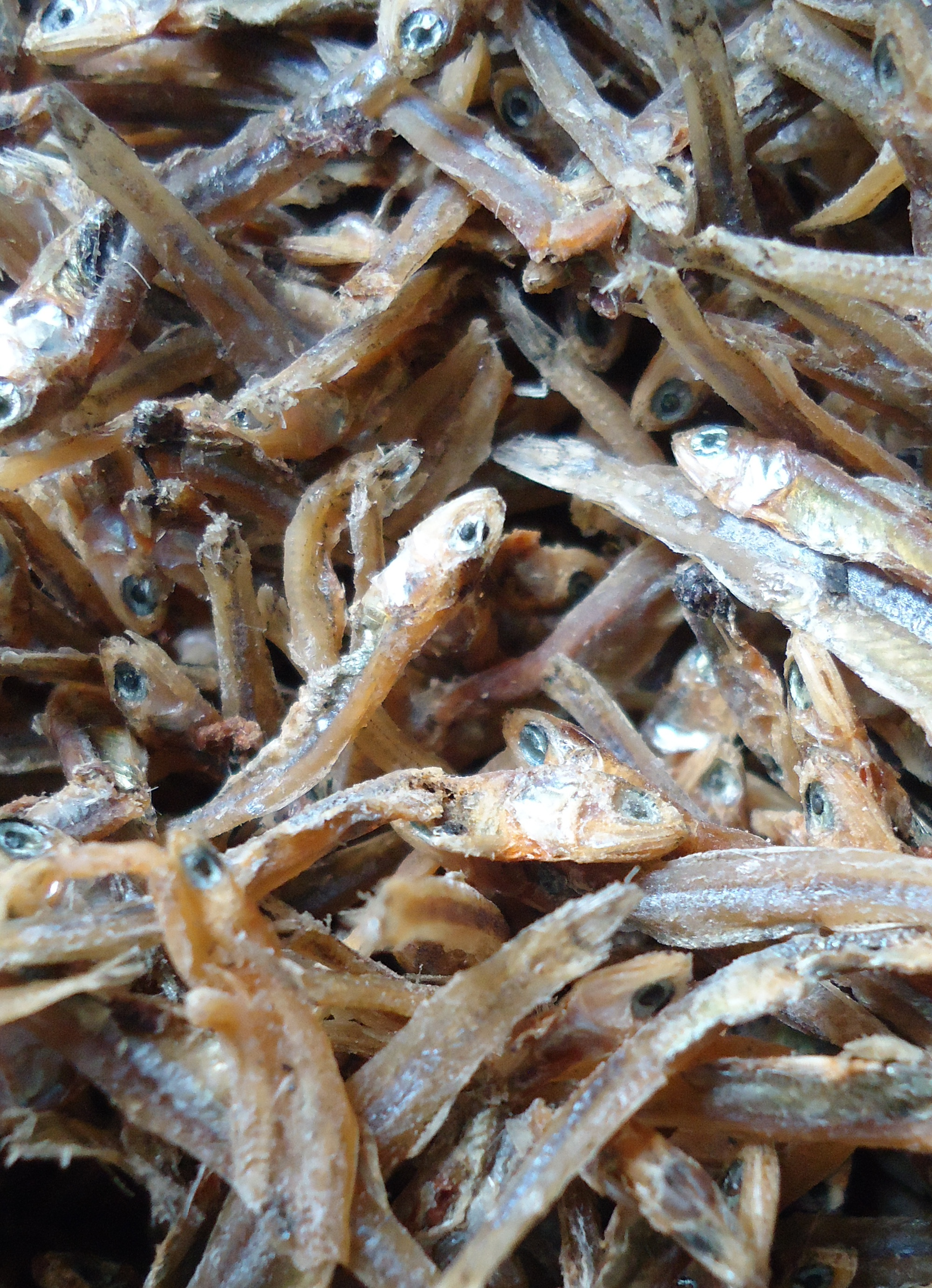
- dried Philippine Anchovies

Conservation status
- Data Deficient (IUCN 3.1)

Scientific classification
- Kingdom: Animalia
- Phylum: Chordata
- Class: Actinopterygii
- Order: Clupeiformes
- Family: Engraulidae
- Genus: Encrasicholina
- Species: E. oligobranchus

Binomial name
- Encrasicholina oligobranchus (Wongratana, 1983)

Synonyms
- Stolephorus oligobranchus Wongratana, 1983

= Encrasicholina oligobranchus =

Philippine anchovy

Species of fish

Encrasicholina oligobranchus, also known as Philippine anchovy, is a species of ray-finned fish in the family Engraulidae. It is found in the western-central Pacific Ocean.

== Size ==
This species reaches a length of 6.2 cm (2.4 in).
