= John Ruel Manning =

American chemist and technologist (1897–1939)

- Born: April 16, 1897; Accokeek, Maryland
- Died: August 4, 1939 (aged 42) near Cuyahoga Falls, Ohio
- Burial place: Arlington National Cemetery, Arlington, Virginia
- Education: Western Maryland College; Texas A&M College; The George Washington University
- Occupations: Chemist, technologist
- Years active: 1919–1939
- Employers: United States Civil Service (1919–1920); Bureau of Internal Revenue (1920–1928); United States Bureau of Fisheries (1928–1939)
- Known for: Pioneer in fishery products utilization research

John Ruel Manning (April 16, 1897 – August 4, 1939) was an American chemist and technologist. During employment with the United States Bureau of Fisheries (BOF), he became a noted writer and lecturer on the use of fishery products in animal nutrition and pioneered fishery products utilization research, overseeing the BOF's investigations into the use of various applied sciences in the utilization and preservation of fishery products.

== Early life ==
Manning in 1918.

Manning was born in Accokeek, Maryland, on April 16, 1897. He attended public schools in Prince George's County, Maryland, and graduated from Laurel High School in Laurel, Maryland, in 1914. He then graduated from Western Maryland College in 1918 studied at Texas A&M College and at the graduate school at The George Washington University.

== Military service ==
The United States entered World War I on 6 April 1917, and during the war Manning served as an enlisted man in the United States Army Signal Corps. The war ended on 11 November 1918, and after its conclusion Manning was commissioned in the United States Army Reserve as a second lieutenant in the Chemical Warfare Service. At the time of his death, he held the rank of lieutenant colonel in the Chemical Warfare Service.

== Civilian career ==
=== Civil Service and Bureau of Internal Revenue ===
After concluding his World War I service, Manning became the chemical examiner for the United States Civil Service in 1919. In 1920, he became an assistant chemist at the Washington, D.C., laboratory of the United States Department of the Treasury's Bureau of Internal Revenue, Over the next several years he served as the chief chemist at Bureau of Internal Revenue field laboratories in Little Rock, Arkansas; St. Louis, Missouri; and Pittsburgh, Pennsylvania.

=== Bureau of Fisheries ===
In 1928, Manning left the Bureau of Internal Revenue to assume the position of associate technologist at the United States Bureau of Fisheries (BOF). In 1930, he rose to the position of Chief of the Technological Section, the highest-ranking position in the BOF's technological service. In that capacity, he pioneered the concept of fishery products utilization research, supervising BOF investigations into the use of the applied sciences — including the use of bacteriology, chemistry, pharmacology, engineering, and general food technology — in identifying uses for and methods of preserving marine products. A lecturer and author, he authored scores of papers and reports on the chemistry of foods and drugs, vitamins, nutrition, and technology and gave numerous addresses on these topics during his BOF career, and he became well known among fisheries scientists and in the fishing industry. His final work focused primarily on experimentation with the use of fish oils and fish meal in poultry food, and he published several articles on the use of fishery products in animal and poultry feed.

== Other work and personal life ==
Manning was a member of several professional societies, including the American Chemical Society of Washington, D.C., and the Arkansas Pharmaceutical Association. He also belonged to the Southern Maryland Society and served as president of the Chevy Chase Citizens Association in the Chevy Chase neighborhood of Washington, D.C.

Manning was married to Dolores Burrow Manning. They had two children, John R. Manning, Jr., and Roger B. Manning.

The September 1, 1939, edition of the BOF's Fisheries Service Bulletin described Manning as having a “genial nature,” “pleasing personality,” and “ready wit,” with “loyalty to his principles" and known for his “enthusiasm and tireless efforts in handling the problems of his work.”

== Death ==
Manning gave a presentation on the importance of fishery products in animal nutrition — specifically, the use of fish oils in feeding poultry — at the scientific sessions of the Seventh World's Poultry Congress (or International Poultry Congress; sources disagree) in Cleveland, Ohio, in early August 1939, then fell ill after boarding a train to return to Washington, D.C. After several hours, he died aboard the train on the evening of August 4, 1939, at the age of 42. His body was removed from the train at Cuyahoga Falls, Ohio. He was buried at Arlington National Cemetery in Arlington, Virginia.

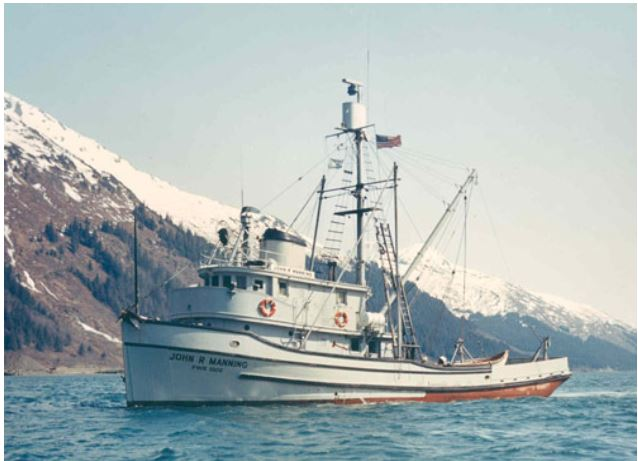
US FWS John R. Manning

== Commemoration ==
The research vessel US FWS John R. Manning, which served in the fleet of the United States Fish and Wildlife Service from 1950 to 1969, was named in honor of Manning.
