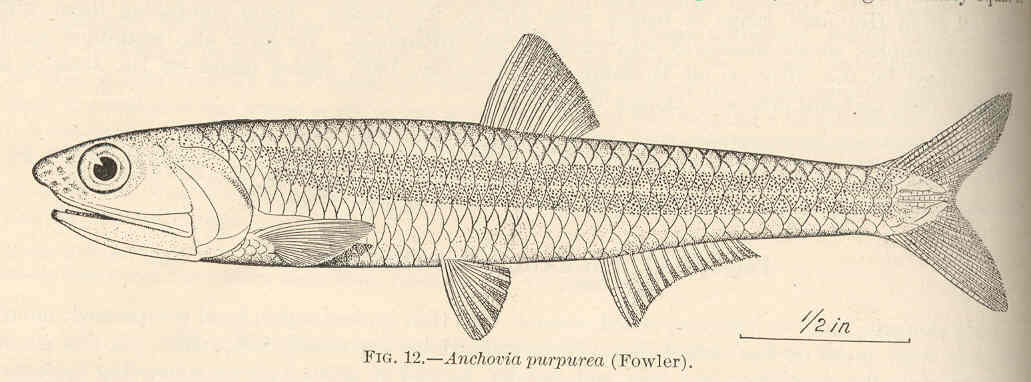
- Illustration of Encrasicholina purpurea, formerly Anchovia purpurea

Conservation status
- Least Concern (IUCN 3.1)

Scientific classification
- Kingdom: Animalia
- Phylum: Chordata
- Class: Actinopterygii
- Order: Clupeiformes
- Family: Engraulidae
- Genus: Encrasicholina
- Species: E. purpurea

Binomial name
- Encrasicholina purpurea (Fowler, 1900)

= Encrasicholina purpurea =

Hawaiian anchovy

Species of ray-finned fish

Encrasicholina purpurea, the Hawaiian anchovy, known in Hawaiian as nehu, is an anchovy of the family Engraulidae that is endemic to the Hawaiian Islands. This species was previously known as Stolephorus purpurea, but it has since changed to Encrasicholina purpurea. They are often used as bait fish.

== Description ==
The Hawaiian anchovy is similar to the buccaneer anchovy in having a cylindrical body, but differs in having fewer gillrakers and a shorter maxilla. They typically reach lengths of about 7.5 cm. They also tend to live to about 6 months old. The mouth of the E. purpurea is in a downward slant with a wide opening and small teeth inside. They tend to bite their prey instead of swallowing whole or filtering.

== Biology ==
The Hawaiian anchovy feeds on plankton. It is chiefly marine, frequenting in schools and can tolerate various salinities in fish ponds. The Nehu has an olfactory forefront bulb which is used to help sense prey, especially during infancy when their visual detection is lacking. Once they reach about 25mm at around 2 months old, their development progresses rapidly. Their ocular lenses will grow quicker so they can see prey better, as well as cerebellum and fins so they have better locomotive control to avoid predators and catch fast moving prey. They will undergo metamorphosis into juveniles at around 30mm.

== Distribution & Habitat ==
Encrasicholina purpurea are found throughout the Pacific Ocean surrounding the Hawaiian Islands. They tend to occupy near the island coasts in unclear waters. Although, adults occasionally move to offshore waters and back, with schools of Nehu having been found far offshore and in clearer waters. Their eggs and adolescent are typically found in enclosed spaces and estuary-type waters. Researchers often do experiments on the Nehu in Kaneohe Bay. They find many eggs 5 meters below, though they also wash up into shallower waters making them easy to find.

== Human Use & Cultural Significance ==
Since the Nehu are so abundant and easy to use as bait, they are often used as such by fisheries and fishermen. One species of fish in which Nehu are often used as bait for is Katsuwonus pelamis, or Hawaiian Skipjack Tuna.

== Ecosystem Impact ==
Hawaiian Anchovy impact the ecosystem, as they are major consumers of zooplankton. A staple of their diet includes chaetognaths, Larvaecean tunicates, holoplankton like ghost shrimp, and planktonic crustaceans. Nehu larvae are known to eat crustaceans like Copepod Nauplii. As a result, it’s predicted that they have a large effect of zooplankton population in the bays. Encrasicholina Purpurea themselves are preyed upon by adult herrings, as well as occasionally compete with them for food. The eggs and larvae are eaten by carnivorous large zooplankton such as Lucifer chacei.
