= Henry O'Malley =

American ichtyologist

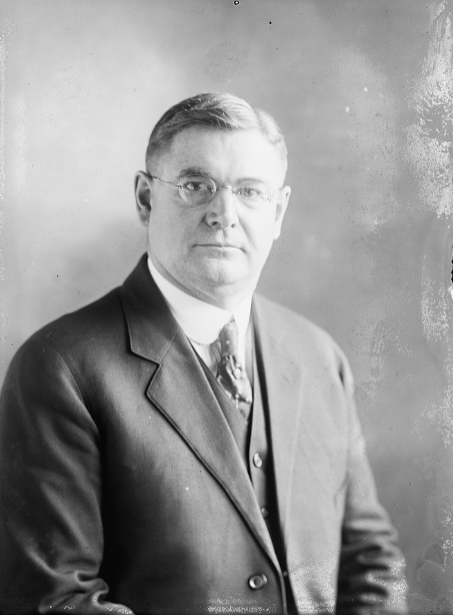
- Henry O'Malley on May 13, 1922.

United States Commissioner of Fish and Fisheries
- In office May 17, 1922 – April 15, 1933
- President: Warren G. Harding (1922–1923); Calvin Coolidge (1923–1929); Herbert Hoover (1929–1933); Franklin D. Roosevelt (1933)
- Preceded by: Hugh M. Smith
- Succeeded by: Frank T. Bell

Personal details
- Born: March 22, 1876 St. Johnsbury, Vermont
- Died: April 24, 1936 (aged 60) Seattle, Washington
- Education: St. Johnsbury Academy
- Profession: Fish culturist

Henry O'Malley (March 22, 1876 —April 24, 1936) was an American fish culturist who led the United States Bureau of Fisheries (BOF) as the seventh United States Commissioner of Fish and Fisheries from 1922 to 1933. The BOF experienced significant growth in many areas during his tenure, and he was noted for his leadership in protection of the American fishing industry and of fish spawning grounds, especially the rehabilitation of depleted fishery resources in the Columbia River and the Territory of Alaska.

== Early life ==
O'Malley was born at St. Johnsbury, Vermont, on March 22, 1876. He graduated from the St. Johnsbury Academy in 1895.

== Career ==
=== Early career ===
After graduation from the St. Johnsbury Academy, O'Malley worked for the American Express Company, but on December 14, 1897, he took a job as a laborer and apprentice fish culturist at the United States Fish Commission station at St. Johnsbury, and thereafter he advanced steadily within the Fish Commission's Division of Fish Culture. In 1898, he was promoted to skilled laborer and transferred to a new position at the Fish Commission station in Leadville, Colorado.

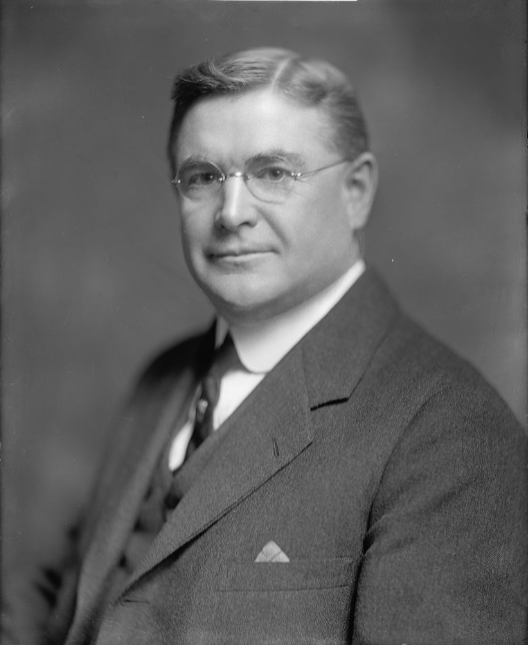
Henry O'Malley in 1905.

In 1899, the Fish Commission assigned him to duty as a fish culturist at its new fish hatchery at Baker Lake in the State of Washington. For a short time, he was foreman at the Fish Commission station at Baird, California, before returning to Baker Lake in 1903 ― the year the Fish Commission was reorganized to become the United States Bureau of Fisheries (BOF) ― to serve as superintendent there, overseeing all BOF operations in the State of Washington. While at Baker Lake in 1905, he discovered a salt-solution process for separating dead fish eggs from live ones, eliminating the need for the BOF to hire large numbers of people to separate the eggs by hand, saving the United States Government a large amount of money every year.

O'Malley next became superintendent at the BOF station at Clackamas, Oregon, in 1907, where he oversaw BOF activities in the Columbia River watershed. At the time, salmon runs in the Columbia River were in decline, and to address the problem, O'Malley directed that BOF hatcheries abandon the practice of releasing salmon fry as soon as they absorbed their yolk sacs and instead to continue to feed the growing fry on an extensive scale. The new procedure resulted in greatly augmented salmon runs on the Columbia River in future years.

O'Malley became field superintendent in December 1913, in charge of all BOF fish-culture work on the United States West Coast. In that capacity he opened the headquarters of the newly established Pacific Coast office of the BOF at Seattle, Washington, in 1914.

On April 5, 1916, O'Malley became chief of the BOF's Division of Fish Culture at Washington, D.C. He returned to Seattle in 1918 and assumed duty there on July 1 or July 3, 1918 (sources disagree), as the field assistant in charge of all of the BOF's Pacific Coast operations. He spent the entire 1919, 1920, and 1921 fishing seasons in the Territory of Alaska, working with Stanford University's pioneering ichthyologist and fisheries biologist Charles H. Gilbert on investigations of the fisheries there. The BOF published their findings in 1919 and 1920.

=== Commissioner of Fish and Fisheries ===
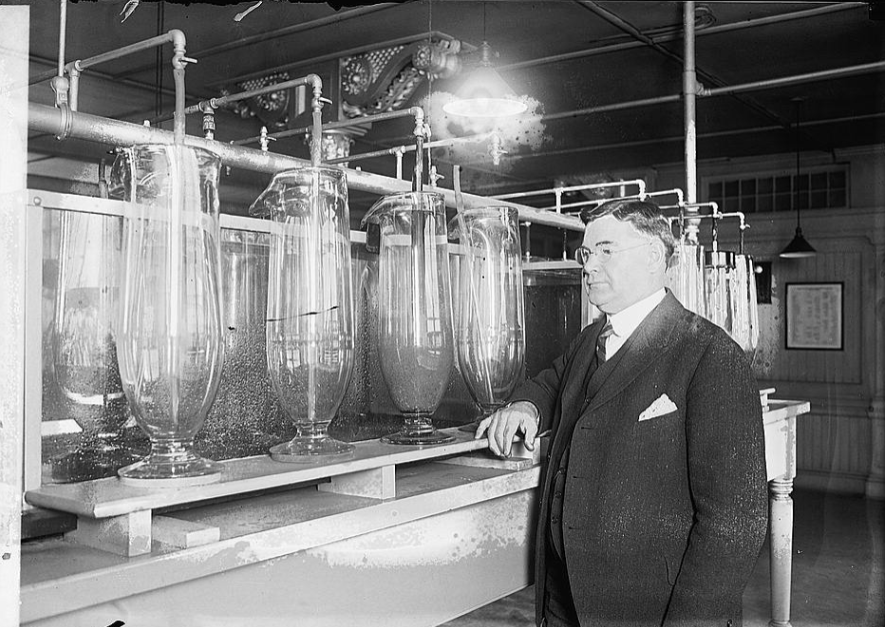
Commissioner O'Malley inspects a United States Bureau of Fisheries fish hatchery on May 10, 1923.

On May 13, 1922, President Warren G. Harding appointed O'Malley United States Commissioner of Fish and Fisheries, in which capacity O'Malley oversaw the BOF; Harding chose him from among over 20 applicants for the position. An experienced fish culturist and an advocate of fisheries science and related scientific research, O'Malley brought a deep understanding and appreciation of the BOF and its efforts to the commissioner's position, which he assumed on May 17, 1922. The BOF saw great expansion in its work in fish culture, science, technology, and statistics during his tenure, including a "five-year plan" for the construction of BOF facilities that led to a notable increase in the number of BOF fish hatcheries. He gained national prominence for his work in protecting the American fishing industry and the spawning grounds of fish.

O'Malley had a particular interest in the management and protection of the fishery and fur seal resources of the Territory of Alaska. Thanks in part to his advocacy and despite numerous obstacles to its passage, the United States Congress passed the so-called "White Law" of June 6, 1924, which gave the United States Secretary of Commerce, to whom the Commissioner of Fish and Fisheries reported, broad regulatory powers over fisheries in Alaska. For the rest of his tenure as commissioner, O'Malley annually spent the entire fishing season in Alaska to oversee personally the implementation of BOF regulations and policies authorized by the law. This played an important role in the rehabilitation of what had been badly depleted salmon runs and other fisheries in Alaskan waters and establishing their future sustainability.

After serving as commissioner for almost 11 years, O'Malley stepped aside on April 15, 1933, so that recently elected President Franklin D. Roosevelt could appoint a new commissioner of his own choosing.

=== Later career ===
O'Malley assumed the position of superintendent of the BOF station at Baird, California, on May 16, 1933. It was the final position of his BOF career. During the winter of 1933–1934, he suffered from a severe illness which left him unable to carry out his duties. His last day of employment was August 31, 1934, and he retired effective September 1, 1934, due to medical disability after almost 37 years of service in the Fish Commission and BOF.

== Other work and personal life ==
O'Malley wrote articles on fisheries that appeared in various United States Government publications. He served as president of the Pacific Coast Fisheries Society in 1916–1917. During its annual meeting held August 29–31, 1917, the American Fisheries Society elected him its president for the 1917–1918 term.

The May 1, 1936, edition of the BOF's Fisheries Service Bulletin described O'Malley as a man known for "his kindly and gentle nature, his ready wit, his unswerving loyalty to his friends, and his resourcefulness in handling problems confronting him." It added that "[h]is attainments in his chosen field, rising as he did from the lowest [position in the Fish Commission] to the highest [in the BOF], should be a constant inspiration to others."

== Death ==
During a vacation in Alaska in the summer of 1935, O'Malley suffered a heart attack. Although severely ill, he appeared to be recovering by the spring of 1936, but he died suddenly in Seattle on April 24, 1936, at the age of 60.

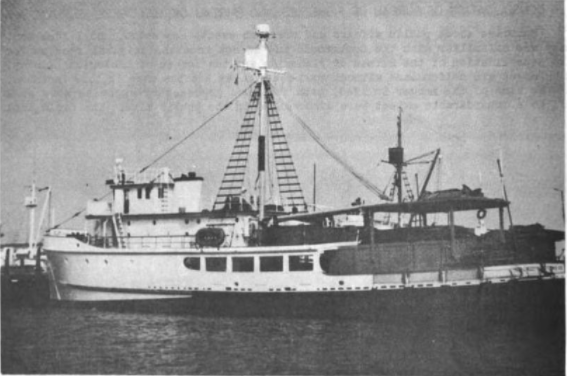
US FWS Henry O'Malley

== Commemoration ==
US FWS Henry O'Malley, a fisheries research vessel in the fleet of the United States Department of the Interior's Fish and Wildlife Service from 1948 to 1951, was named for O'Malley.

Government offices
| Preceded by Hugh M. Smith | United States Commissioner of Fish and Fisheries; 1922–1933 | Succeeded by Frank T. Bell |
