= Encrasicholina intermedia =

Shiner anchovy

Conservation status
- Data Deficient (IUCN 3.1)

Scientific classification
- Kingdom: Animalia
- Phylum: Chordata
- Class: Actinopterygii
- Division: Teleostei
- Order: Clupeiformes
- Family: Engraulidae
- Genus: Encrasicholina
- Species: E. intermedia

Binomial name
- Encrasicholina intermedia Hata & Motomura, 2016

Species of fish

Encrasicholina intermedia, the shiner anchovy, is a species of ray-finned fish in the family Engraulidae. It is found in the western Indian Ocean.

== Size ==
This species reaches a length of 7.5 cm (3.0 in).
