= Encrasicholina gloria =

Red Sea anchovy

Conservation status
- Data Deficient (IUCN 3.1)

Scientific classification
- Kingdom: Animalia
- Phylum: Chordata
- Class: Actinopterygii
- Order: Clupeiformes
- Family: Engraulidae
- Genus: Encrasicholina
- Species: E. gloria

Binomial name
- Encrasicholina gloria Hata & Motomura, 2016

Species of fish

Encrasicholina gloria, the Red Sea anchovy, is a species of ray-finned fish in the family Engraulidae. It is found in the western Indian Ocean.

== Size ==
This species reaches a length of 7.2 cm (2.8 in).
