= Marindin =

Marindin may refer to:

- Francis Marindin (1838–1900), a colonel who served with the Royal Engineers
- USC&GS Marindin, a launch that served as a survey ship in the United States Coast and Geodetic Survey from 1919 to 1944
