= USC&GS Oceanographer =

USC&GS Oceanographer was the name of two ships of the United States Coast and Geodetic Survey, and may refer to:

- USC&GS Oceanographer (OSS 26), an ocean survey ship (OSS) in service from 1930 to 1942, which also served in the United States Navy as the patrol vessel USS Corsair (SP-159) from 1917 to 1919 and as the survey ship USS Oceanographer (AGS-3) from 1942 to 1944.
- USC&GS Oceanographer (OSS 01), an ocean survey ship (OSS) in service from 1966 to 1970 which then served in the National Oceanic and Atmospheric Administration as the research ship NOAAS Oceanographer (R 101) from 1970 to 1996.
