= Westdahl =

Westdahl may refer to:

- Ferdinand Westdahl (1843-1919), an accomplished member of the United States Coast and Geodetic survey from 1867 to 1919
- John Westdahl (1916-1968), American politician
- SS Ferdinand Westdahl, a Liberty ship; see List of Liberty ships: A-F
- USC&GS Westdahl, a survey ship of the United States Coast and Geodetic Survey in commission from 1929 to 1946
- Westdahl Volcano, a volcano in the Aleutian Islands
