= USC&GS Arago (1854) =

History

United States
- Name: Arago
- Namesake: French astronomer and physicist Dominique François Jean Arago (1786–1853)
- Builder: Fardy and Brothers, Baltimore, Maryland
- Completed: 1854
- In service: 1854-1881
- Fate: Sold 1881

General characteristics
- Type: Survey ship
- Length: 81 ft (25 m)
- Beam: 23 ft (7.0 m)
- Draft: 4 ft 5 in (1.35 m)
- Propulsion: sails
- Sail plan: Schooner-rigged
- Armament: Weapons of unrecorded size and number while armed by Treasury Department Revenue Service and during attachment to Navy's blockading squadron.

USC&GS Arago was a survey ship that served in the United States Coast Survey from 1854 to 1878 (Note: A different Arago, built in 1855 and existing over a similar time period, was a 295 ft (90 m) paddle wheel steamer of the New York and Havre Steam Navigation Co. that was chartered to the War Department for a time during the American Civil War.) and in the United States Coast and Geodetic Survey from 1878 to 1881. From October 1861 into 1863 Arago was at times attached to the Navy's South Atlantic Blockading Squadron off South Carolina to provide hydrographic support. She was the first ship of the Coast Survey or Coast and Geodetic Survey to bear the name.

== Construction and early service ==
Arago was built by Fardy and Brothers at Baltimore, Maryland, in 1854. She did survey work for the Coast Survey along the Atlantic coast of the United States.

== Service history ==
Arago was surveying under Lieutenant Edwin J. De Haven, USN, Assistant in the Coast Survey, on the Texas coast when on May 15, 1855, anchors dragged off a lee shore as the ship was landing materials for signals and the ship was grounded. The ship's party was unable to get her off and a messenger was sent by foot to Galveston seeking help. The Coast Survey schooner Belle, working with Arago, brought anchors and gear so that on May 25 Arago was again afloat with little damage.

During 1861 the Arago was working on triangulation, topography and hydrography of Passamaquoddy Bay, Maine under the general supervision of Assistant C. O. Boutelle and was also armed and under control of the Treasury Department Revenue Service. (Note: The Revenue Service of the time had an armed naval force, the United States Revenue Cutter Service that would later be merged with the United States Life-Saving Service to become the United States Coast Guard. In effect, the Arago, while still conducting surveys, became an auxiliary Revenue Cutter Service vessel.) The ship was surveying Eastport Harbor when, under the authority of the collector of customs for Eastport and the lack of any other government ship, Arago was directed to be on the lookout for and seize blockade runners. The ships Express and Orizimba and the Alice Ball in the Bay of Fundy, all owned by interests in New Orleans, were thus seized. As the ship was returning to survey work after these seizures under Mr. Robert Platt, the Arago's first officer, she was required to send an armed party to put down a mutiny aboard the "American ship General Norvell" and placing the ten mutineers in custody of proper officials. The ship resumed operations until October 15, 1861.

=== Attachment to the South Atlantic Blockading Squadron ===
As requested in a letter of October 16, 1861 from Secretary of the Navy Gideon Welles to the Secretary of Treasury Arago was ordered to report to Flag Officer, Commanding the South Atlantic Blockading Squadron to assist with surveys supporting operations of that squadron in South Carolina waters. She proceeded to join the squadron by way of New York where she was provided additional armament at the New York Navy Yard. Arago and the steamer Vixen joined the squadron and sailed only to have the fleet scattered by a storm so that most ships had to sail independently. Vixen was first to arrive and when the fleet rejoined Arago and Vixen participated in the expedition to seize Port Royal, South Carolina. After surveys in the vicinity of Port Royal the survey personnel continued to support blockading fleet operations with surveys and buoying channels. In July 1862 Arago, with the schooner Caswell and steamer Bibb returned to New York.

=== Resumption of regular service ===
Arago was again in South Carolina in May, 1863 surveying passages between St. Helena and Port Royal Sounds to assist naval communications between Port Royal and Savannah, Georgia. The ship returned to New York with July through the end of August 1863 spent surveying Rockland Harbor, Maine during which the mayor of Rockport, Maine requested assistance in putting down a "popular revolt." Assistant W. S. Edwards, commanding Arago, brought up the ship and ship's company for assistance, but the revolt did not occur. From September through November the ship was involved in a general survey of the Hudson River above New Baltimore, New York up to Troy, New York.

For the remainder of her career, she served along the U.S. Atlantic coast. She suffered a major mishap in 1867 when she struck a leftover Confederate defense stake set in the Neuse River in North Carolina. Through the efforts of her acting master, James H. Porter, Assistant Fairfield with the Survey's schooner Dana and Captain J. M. Reese commanding the Revenue Cutter Stevens (Note: The USRC Naugatuck was originally known as the USRC E. A. Stevens and was a unique vessel. According to William H. Thiesen on page 153 in the article "Revenue Cutter Service Gunboat E. A. Stevens: The Stevens Family's Civil War Experiment in Modern Naval Technology"; (Nautical Research Journal 54, No. 3 (Fall 2009), pp. 141–154.) from 1865 until the summer of 1889 this vessel was based in New Berne, North Carolina tasked with patrolling the inland sounds of North Carolina where the Arago stake incident occurred. The cited annual report uses the name "Stevens" though the vessel may have been officially Naugatuck at the time.) she was back in service in ten days. Annual fiscal year reports of the Superintendent Of The Coast Survey from 1869 through 1877 note the schooner Arago working in the sounds of the North Carolina coast including Pamlico (old spelling Pamplico used), Albemarle and Currituck and associated rivers.

Beginning in 1871, and for the remainder of her career, she was one of two Coast Survey (later Coast and Geodetic Survey) ships named Arago, the other being Arago of 1871.

When the Coast Survey was reorganized in 1878 to form the United States Coast and Geodetic Survey, Arago became part of the new service.

Arago was laid up at League Island, Pennsylvania, during fiscal year 1881 and then sold that year 1881.
