= USC&GS Ogden =

Survey ship in United States Coast and Geographic Survey

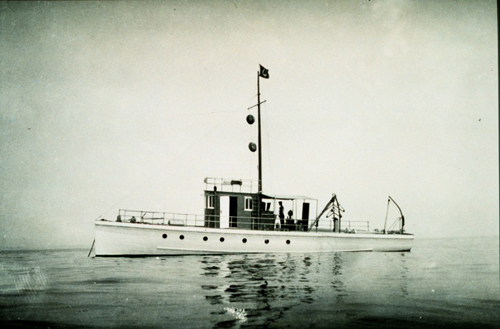
- USC&GS Ogden conducting current surveys in Boston Harbor.

History

United States
- Name: Ogden
- Namesake: Herbert Gouverneur Ogden (1846-1906)
- Builder: Canton Lumber Company, Baltimore, Maryland
- Cost: $12,000 USD
- Completed: 1919
- In service: 1919
- Out of service: 1944

General characteristics
- Type: Survey Launch
- Length: 60 ft (18 m)
- Beam: 14.8 ft (4.5 m)
- Draft: 4.6 ft (1.4 m)
- Propulsion: Two gasoline engines

USC&GS Ogden was a launch that served as a survey ship in the United States Coast and Geodetic Survey from 1919 to 1944. She was the only Coast and Geodetic Survey ship to bear the name.

Ogden was built by the Canton Lumber Company at Baltimore, Maryland, in 1919. She entered Coast and Geodetic Survey service that year.

Ogden spent her career on the United States East Coast. She worked as a wire-drag hydrographic survey vessel with the Coast and Geodetic Survey launch USC&GS Marindin.

Ogden was retired from Coast and Geodetic Survey service in 1944.
