= USC&GS Wildcat =

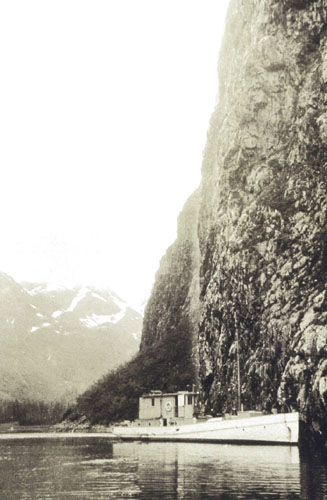
- Wildcat at the base of a 500 ft (150 m) cliff in Palisade Lagoon in Alaska

History

United States
- Name: Wildcat
- Commissioned: 1919
- Decommissioned: 1941

General characteristics
- Type: Launch
- Length: 65 ft 6 in (19.96 m)
- Beam: 15 ft 3 in (4.65 m)
- Draft: 6 ft (1.8 m)
- Propulsion: Steam engine

USC&GS Wildcat was a steam launch that served in the United States Coast and Geodetic Survey from 1919 to 1941. She was the only Coast and Geodetic Survey ship to bear the name.

Wildcat spent her entire Coast and Geodetic Survey career operating in Alaskan waters.

On June 9, 1923, Wildcat helped refloat the merchant ship Anvil, which had run aground in Isanotski Strait.
