= United States Coast and Geodetic Survey =

Former U.S. government scientific agency

- Survey of the Coast (1807–1836); United States Coast Survey (1836–1878); United States Coast and Geodetic Survey (1878–1970)
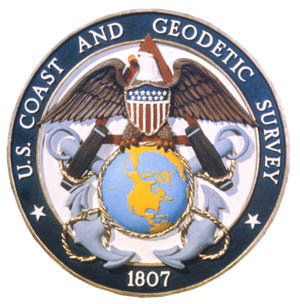
- The seal of the United States Coast and Geodetic Survey

- The United States Coast and Geodetic Survey flag, in use from 1899 to 1970

Agency overview
- Formed: February 10, 1807; 219 years ago
- Preceding agency: none
- Dissolved: October 3, 1970; 56 years ago
- Superseding agency: National Oceanic and Atmospheric Administration
- Jurisdiction: United States federal government
- Parent agency: U.S. Department of the Treasury (1816–1818; 1832–1834); U.S. Department of the Navy (1834–1836); U.S. Department of the Treasury (1836–1903); U.S. Department of Commerce and Labor (1903–1913); U.S. Department of Commerce (1913–1965); Environmental Science Services Administration (1965–1970)

The United States Coast and Geodetic Survey (abbreviated USC&GS; known as the Survey of the Coast from 1807 to 1836, and as the United States Coast Survey from 1836 until 1878) was the first scientific agency of the United States government. It existed from 1807 to 1970, and throughout its history was responsible for mapping and charting the coast of the United States, and later the coasts of U.S. territories. In 1871, it gained the additional responsibility of surveying the interior of the United States and geodesy became a more important part of its work, leading to it being renamed the U.S. Coast and Geodetic Survey in 1878.

Long the U.S. government's only scientific agency, the Survey accumulated other scientific and technical responsibilities as well, including astronomy, cartography, metrology, meteorology, geology, geophysics, hydrography, navigation, oceanography, exploration, pilotage, tides, and topography. It also was responsible for the standardization of weights and measures throughout the United States from 1836 to 1901. In 1959, it was assigned the responsibility for U.S. government oceanographic studies worldwide.

By the mid-19th century, the Coast and Geodetic Survey operated a fleet of survey ships that constituted a distinct seagoing service of the United States until 1970. The Survey supported U.S. military operations in wartime, and in 1917 the Coast and Geodetic Survey Corps was created as a new uniformed service of the United States to carry out both wartime and peacetime surveying and related operations.

In 1970, the Coast and Geodetic Survey was abolished when it merged with other government agencies to create the National Oceanic and Atmospheric Administration (NOAA), but its elements were reorganized and incorporated into NOAA as the National Ocean Survey, later renamed the National Ocean Service. In addition to the National Ocean Service, NOAA's National Geodetic Survey, Office of Coast Survey, and NOAA fleet all trace their ancestry in whole or in part to the Coast and Geodetic Survey, and the NOAA Commissioned Officer Corps is the descendant of the Coast and Geodetic Survey Corps. In addition, the modern National Institute of Standards and Technology, although long separated from the Coast and Geodetic Survey, traces its ancestry to the Coast and Geodetic Survey's Office of Weights and Measures.

== History ==
=== Earliest years ===
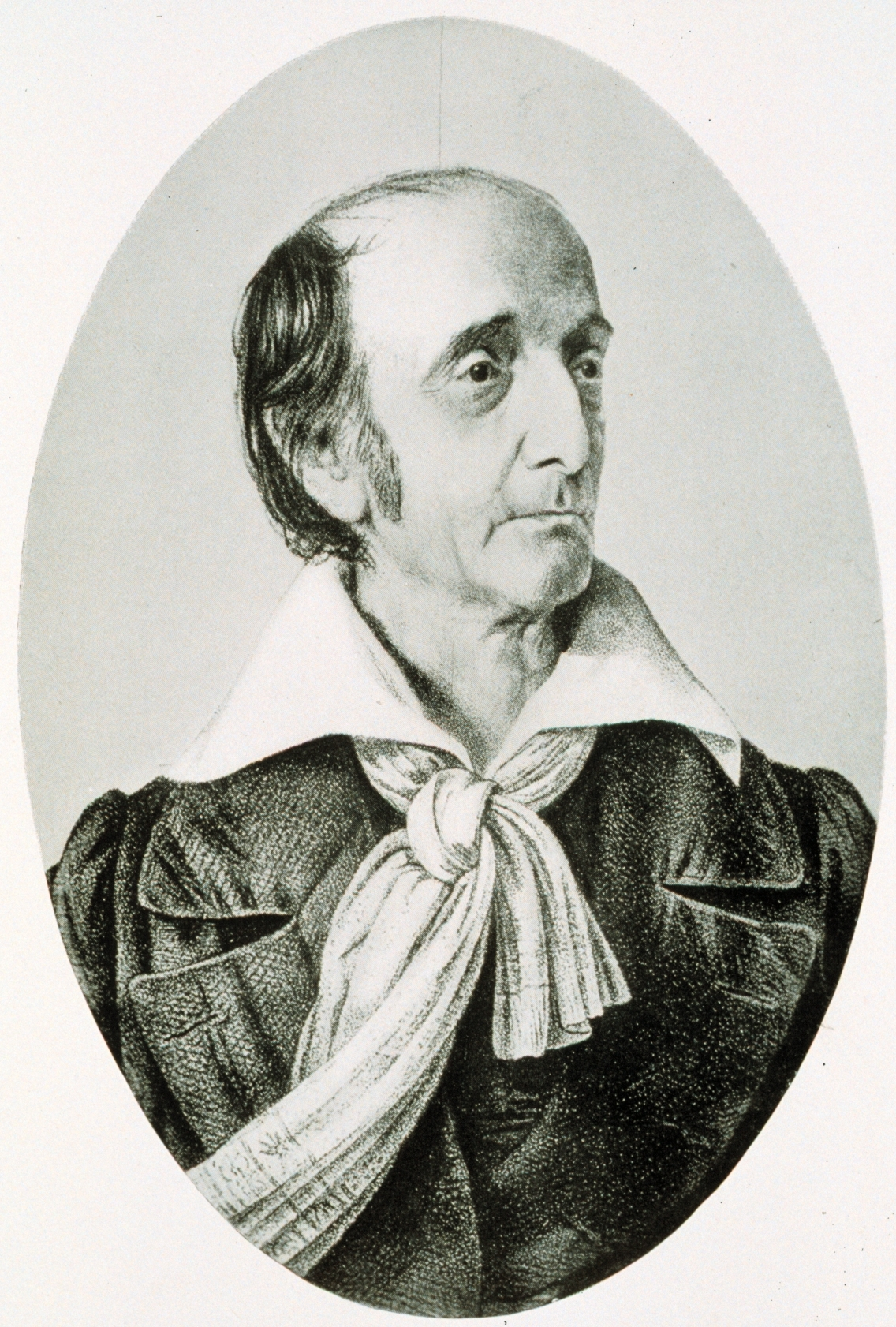
Ferdinand Rudolph Hassler was the first superintendent of the Survey of the Coast, renamed the U.S. Coast Survey during his tenure.

Logo celebrating the 200th anniversary of the founding of the Survey of the Coast

The United States Coast and Geodetic Survey began its existence as the United States Survey of the Coast, created within the United States Department of the Treasury by an Act of Congress on February 10, 1807, to conduct a "Survey of the Coast." The Survey of the Coast, the United States government's first scientific agency, represented the interest of the administration of President Thomas Jefferson in science and the stimulation of international trade by using scientific surveying methods to chart the waters of the United States and make them safe for navigation. A Swiss immigrant with expertise in both surveying and the standardization of weights and measures, Ferdinand R. Hassler, was selected to lead the Survey.

Hassler submitted a plan for the survey work involving the use of triangulation to ensure scientific accuracy of surveys, but international relations prevented the new Survey of the Coast from beginning its work; the Embargo Act of 1807 brought American overseas trade virtually to a halt only a month after Hassler's appointment and remained in effect until Jefferson left office in March 1809. It was not until 1811 that Jefferson's successor, President James Madison, sent Hassler to Europe to purchase the instruments necessary to conduct the planned survey, as well as standardized weights and measures. Hassler departed on August 29, 1811, but eight months later, while he was in England, the War of 1812 broke out, forcing him to remain in Europe until its conclusion in 1815. Hassler did not return to the United States until August 16, 1815. The Survey finally began surveying operations in 1816, when Hassler started work in the vicinity of New York City. The first baseline was measured and verified in 1817.

=== Suspension of work ===
With surveying work barely underway, Hassler was taken by surprise when the United States Congress – frustrated by the slow and limited progress the Survey had made in its first decade, unwilling to endure the time and expense involved in scientifically precise surveying, unconvinced of the propriety of expending U.S. government funds on scientific endeavors, and uncomfortable with Hassler leading the effort because of his foreign birth – enacted legislation on April 14, 1818, which repealed most of the 1807 statute. Congress believed that United States Army and United States Navy officers could achieve surveying results adequate for safe navigation during their routine navigation and charting activities and could do so more quickly and cheaply than Hassler, so its 1818 law removed the Survey of the Coast from the Department of the Treasury, prohibited the U.S. government from employing civilians to conduct coastal surveys, and gave the U.S. Army and U.S. Navy responsibility for such surveys under the auspices of the United States Department of War and United States Department of the Navy, respectively. Although the 1818 law did not abolish the Survey of the Coast, it had the effect of removing Hassler from the superintendency and suspending the Survey's operations.

During the 14 years from 1818 to 1832, the Survey existed without a superintendent or civilian workforce and without conducting any surveys. During these years, the Army conducted no surveys, those the Navy carried out achieved unsatisfactory results, and the United States Secretary of the Navy and others repeatedly called on Congress to revive the 1807 law.

=== Work resumes ===
On July 10, 1832, Congress passed a law renewing the original law of 1807 and somewhat extending its scope, placing the responsibility for coastal surveying back in the Survey of the Coast, returning it to the Department of the Treasury, and permitting the hiring of civilians to carry it out. Hassler was reappointed as the Survey's superintendent that year. As authorized by the 1832 law, the administration of President Andrew Jackson expanded and extended the Survey of the Coast's scope and organization. The Survey of the Coast resumed field work in April 1833.

In July 1833, Edmund E. Blunt, the son of hydrographer Edmund B. Blunt, accepted a position with the Survey. The elder Blunt had begun publication of the American Coast Pilot – the first book of sailing directions, nautical charts, and other information for mariners in North American waters to be published in North America – in 1796. Although the Survey relied on articles it published in local newspapers to provide information to mariners in the next decades, Blunt's employment with the Survey began a relationship between the American Coast Pilot and the Survey in which the Survey's findings were incorporated into the American Coast Pilot and the Survey's charts were sold by the Blunt family, which became staunch allies of the Survey in its disputes with its critics. Eventually, the relationship between the Survey and the Blunts would lead to the establishment of the Survey's United States Coast Pilot publications in the latter part of the 19th century.

=== Association with United States Navy ===
The Survey had barely resumed its work when President Jackson transferred it from the Department of the Treasury to the Department of the Navy on March 11, 1834. Survey results under Navy Department authority again were unsatisfactory, and on March 26, 1836, Jackson ordered the Department of the Treasury to resume the administration of the Survey, which was renamed the United States Coast Survey in 1836. However, the Navy retained a close connection with the hydrographic efforts of the Coast Survey under law requiring Survey ships to be commanded and crewed by U.S. Navy officers and men when the Navy could provide such support. Under this system, which persisted until the Survey was granted the authority to crew its ships in 1900, nearly half the Survey's ships were crewed and officered by U.S. Navy personnel over the 50-year period between 1848 and 1898; U.S. Navy officers and Coast Survey civilians served alongside one another aboard ship, and many of the most famous names in hydrography for both the Survey and Navy of the period are linked. In addition, the United States Department of War provided U.S. Army officers for service with the Survey during its early years. Hassler believed that expertise in coastal surveys would be of importance in future wars and welcomed the participation of Army and Navy personnel, and his vision in this regard laid the foundation for the commissioned corps of officers that would be created in the Survey in 1917 as the ancestor of today's National Oceanic and Atmospheric Administration Commissioned Corps.

=== Growth years under Hassler ===
During the nineteenth century, the remit of the Survey was rather loosely drawn and it had no competitors in federally funded scientific research. Various superintendents developed its work in fields as diverse as astronomy, cartography, meteorology, geodesy, geology, geophysics, hydrography, navigation, oceanography, exploration, pilotage, tides, and topography. The Survey published important articles by Charles Sanders Peirce on the design of experiments and on a criterion for the statistical treatment of outliers. Ferdinand Hassler became the first Superintendent of Weights and Measures beginning in November 1830, and the Office of Weights and Measures, the ancestor of today's National Institute of Standards and Technology, was placed under the control of the Coast Survey in 1836; until 1901, the Survey thus was responsible for the standardization of weights and measures throughout the United States.

When it resumed operations in 1833, the Survey returned to surveys of the New York City area and its maritime approaches. Although U.S. law prohibited the Survey from procuring its own ships, requiring it to use existing public ships such as those of the Navy and the United States Revenue-Marine (which in 1894 became the United States Revenue Cutter Service) for surveying operations afloat, the U.S. Department of the Navy worked around the law by allowing Lieutenant Thomas R. Gedney to purchase the schooner Jersey for the Navy, then deeming Jersey suited only for use by the Survey. Under Gedney's command, Jersey began the Survey's first depth sounding operations in October 1834, and made its first commercially and militarily significant discovery in 1835 by discovering what became known as the Gedney Channel at the entrance to New York Harbor, which significantly reduced sailing times to and from New York City. Gedney was in command of the Revenue-Marine revenue cutter USRC Washington on August 26, 1839, when she discovered and seized the Spanish schooner La Amistad off Culloden Point on Long Island, New York. A slave ship, La Amistad had been taken over by African people on board who were being transported to the United States to be sold as slaves, and Gedney's seizure of La Amistad led to the freedom suit United States v. Schooner Amistad, argued before the United States Supreme Court in 1841.

In 1838, U.S. Navy Lieutenant George M. Bache, while attached to the Survey, suggested standardizing the markings of buoys and navigational markers ashore by painting those on the right when entering a harbor red and those on the left black; instituted by Lieutenant Commander John R. Goldsborough in 1847, the "red right return" system of markings has been in use in the United States ever since. In the early 1840s, the Survey began work in Delaware Bay to chart the approaches to Philadelphia, Pennsylvania.

Amid renewed calls for the Survey again to be transferred to the Department of the Navy, Congress enacted legislation on March 3, 1843, providing for President John Tyler to establish a board to study the Survey and recommend a permanent organization for it. Its report recommended an organization which Tyler approved on April 29, 1843, and still was in place when the Survey left the Department of the Treasury in 1903.

=== The Bache years ===
Professor Alexander Dallas Bache became superintendent of the U.S. Coast Survey after Hassler's death in 1843. During his years as superintendent, he reorganized the Coast Survey in accordance with the plan President Tyler approved and expanded the Survey's work southward along the United States East Coast into the Florida Keys. In 1846 the Survey began to operate a ship, Phoenix, on the United States Gulf Coast for the first time. By 1847, Bache had expanded the Survey's operations from nine U.S. states to seventeen, and by 1849 it also operated along the United States West Coast, giving it a presence along all coasts of the United States. In 1845, he instituted the world's first systematic oceanographic project for studying a specific phenomenon when he directed the Coast Survey to begin systematic studies of the Gulf Stream and its environs, including physical oceanography, geological oceanography, biological oceanography, and chemical oceanography. Bache's initial orders for the Gulf Stream study served as a model for all subsequent integrated oceanographic cruises. Bache also instituted regular and systematic observations of the tides and investigated magnetic forces and directions, making the Survey the center of U.S. government expertise in geophysics for the following century. In the late 1840s, the Survey pioneered the use of the telegraph to provide highly accurate determinations of longitude; known as the "American Method," it soon was emulated worldwide.

Disaster struck the Coast Survey on September 8, 1846, when the survey brig Peter G. Washington encountered a hurricane while she was conducting studies of the Gulf Stream in the Atlantic Ocean off the coast of North Carolina. She was dismasted in the storm with the loss of 11 men who were swept overboard, but she managed to limp into port.

The Mexican War of 1846–1848 saw the withdrawal of virtually all U.S. Army officers from the Coast Survey and the Coast Survey brig Washington was taken over for U.S. Navy service in the war, but overall the war effort had little impact on the Coast Survey's operations. Army officers returned after the war, and the expansion of U.S. territory as a result of the war led to the Coast Survey expanding its operations to include the newly acquired coasts of Texas and California. The famous naturalist Louis Agassiz studied marine life off New England from the Coast Survey steamer Bibb in 1847 and also conducted the first scientific study of the Florida reef system in 1851 under a Coast Survey commission; his son, Alexander Agassiz, later also served aboard Coast Survey ships for technical operations. In the 1850s, the Coast Survey also conducted surveys and measurements in support of efforts to reform the Department of the Treasury's Lighthouse Establishment, and it briefly employed the artist James McNeill Whistler as a draughtsman in 1854–1855.

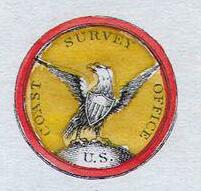
United States Coast Survey emblem from 1853 map

Ever since it began operations, the Coast Survey had faced hostility from politicians who believed that it should complete its work and be abolished as a means of reducing U.S. government expenditures, and Hassler and Bache had fought back periodic attempts to cut its funding. By 1850, the Coast Survey had surveyed enough of the U.S. coastline for a long enough time to learn that – with a few exceptions, such as the rocky coast of New England – coastlines were dynamic and required return visits by Coast Surveyors to keep charts up to date. In 1858, Bache for the first time publicly stated that the Coast Survey was not a temporary organization charged with charting the coasts once, but rather a permanent one that would continually survey coastal areas as they changed over time.

Another significant moment in the Survey's history that occurred in 1858 was the first publication of what would later become the United States Coast Pilot, when Survey employee George Davidson adapted an article from a San Francisco, California, newspaper into an addendum to that year's Annual Report of the Superintendent of the Coast Survey. Although the Survey had previously published its work indirectly via the Blunts' American Coast Pilot, it was the first time that the Survey had published its sailing directions directly in any way other than through local newspapers.

On June 21, 1860, the greatest loss of life in a single incident in the history of NOAA and its ancestor agencies occurred when a commercial schooner collided with the Coast Survey paddle steamer Robert J. Walker in the Atlantic Ocean off New Jersey. Robert J. Walker sank with the loss of 20 men.

A Coast Survey ship took part in an international scientific project for the first time when Bibb observed a solar eclipse from a vantage point off Aulezavik, Labrador, on July 18, 1860, as part of an international effort to study the eclipse. Bibb became the first Coast Survey vessel to operate in subarctic waters.

=== American Civil War ===
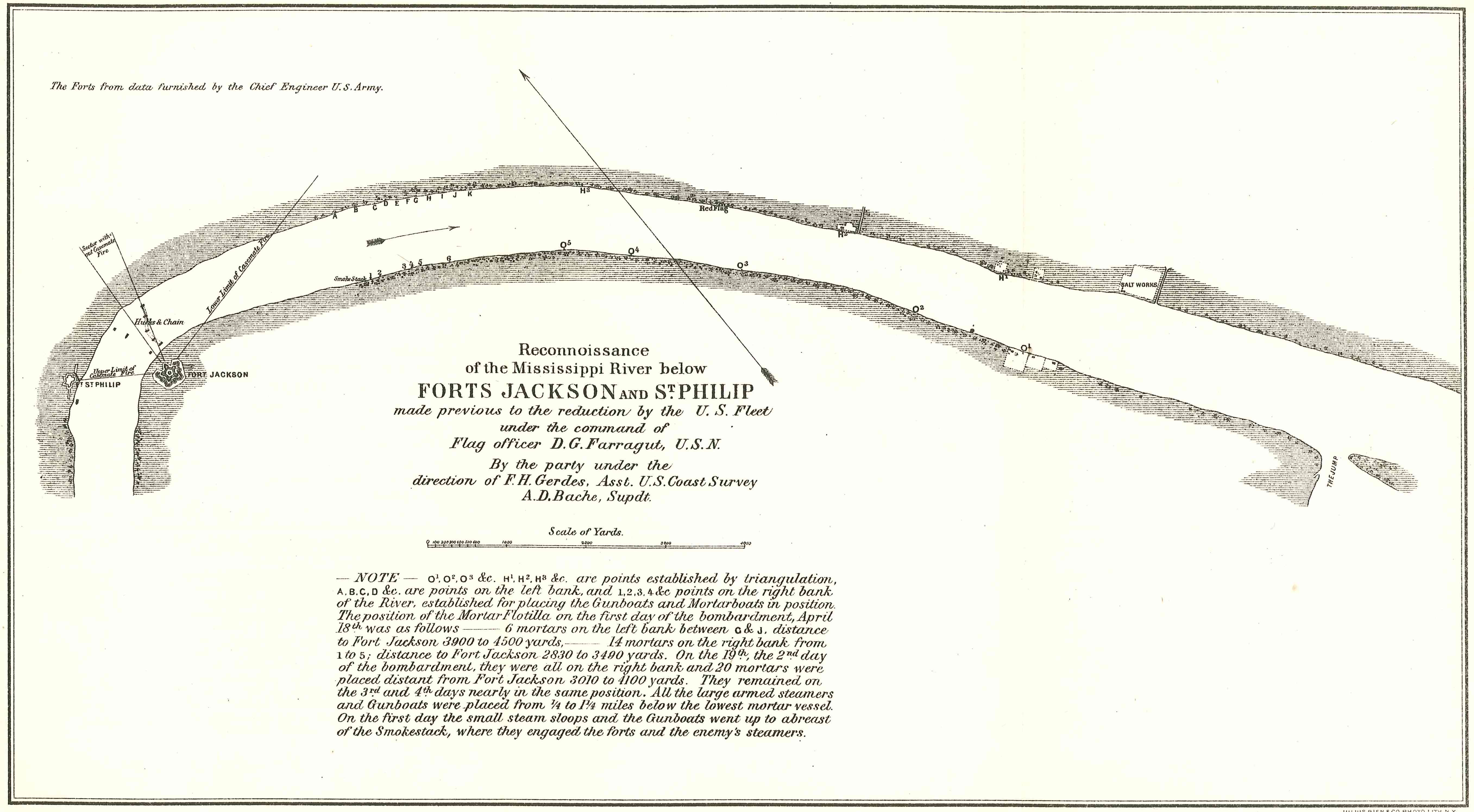
A survey of the Mississippi River in Louisiana below Fort Jackson and Fort St. Philip made by the U.S. Coast Survey to prepare for the bombardment of the forts by David Dixon Porter's mortar fleet in April 1862 during the American Civil War.

The outbreak of the American Civil War in April 1861 caused a dramatic shift in direction for the Coast Survey. All U.S. Army officers were withdrawn from the Survey, as were all but two U.S. Navy officers. Since most men of the Survey had Union sympathies, all but seven of them stayed on with the Survey rather than resigning to serve the Confederate States of America, and their work shifted in emphasis to support of the Union Navy and Union Army. Civilian Coast Surveyors were called upon to serve in the field and provide mapping, hydrographic, and engineering expertise for Union forces. One of the individuals who excelled at this work was Joseph Smith Harris, who supported Rear Admiral David G. Farragut and his Western Gulf Blockading Squadron in the Battle of Forts Jackson and St. Philip in 1862; this survey work was particularly valuable to Commander David Dixon Porter and his mortar bombardment fleet. Coast Surveyors served in virtually all theaters of the war and were often in the front lines or in advance of the front lines carrying out mapping duties, and Coast Survey officers produced many of the coastal charts and interior maps used by Union forces throughout the war. Coast Surveyors supporting the Union Army were given assimilated military rank while attached to a specific command, but those supporting the U.S. Navy operated as civilians and ran the risk of being executed as spies if captured by the Confederates while working in support of Union forces.

=== Post–Civil War ===
The Richards Building, U.S. Coast and Geodetic Survey headquarters from 1871 to 1929, on New Jersey Avenue in Washington, D.C., from Harper's Weekly, October 1888.

Army officers never returned to the Coast Survey, but after the war Navy officers did, and the Coast Survey resumed its peacetime duties. The acquisition of the Department of Alaska in 1867 expanded its responsibilities, as did the progressive exploration, settlement, and enclosure of the continental United States. George W. Blunt sold the copyright for the American Coast Pilot – the Blunt family publication which had appeared in 21 editions since 1796 and had come to consist almost entirely of public information produced by the Survey anyway – in 1867, and the Survey thus took responsibility for publishing it regularly for the first time, spawning a family of such publications for the various coasts of the United States and the Department, District, and Territory of Alaska in the coming years. In 1888, the publications for the United States East and Gulf coasts took the name United States Coast Pilot for the first time, and the publications for the United States West Coast took this name 30 years later. NOAA produces the United States Coast Pilots to this day.

In 1871, Congress officially expanded the Coast Survey's responsibilities to include geodetic surveys in the interior of the country, and one of its first major projects in the interior was to survey the 39th Parallel across the entire country. Between 1874 and 1877, the Coast Survey employed the naturalist and author John Muir as a guide and artist during the survey of the 39th Parallel in the Great Basin of Nevada and Utah. To reflect its acquisition of the mission of surveying the U.S. interior and the growing role of geodesy in its operations, the U.S. Coast Survey was renamed the United States Coast and Geodetic Survey (USC&GS) by a statute passed on June 20, 1878.

The American Coast Pilot had long been lacking in current information when the Coast Survey took control of it in 1867, and the Survey had recognized that deficit but had been hindered by a lack of funding and the risks associated with mooring vessels in deep waters or along dangerous coasts in order to collect the information necessary for updates. The U.S. Congress specifically appropriated funding for such work in the 1875–1876 budget under which the 76-foot (23-meter) schooner Drift was constructed and sent out under U.S. Navy Acting Master and Coast Survey Assistant Robert Platt to the Gulf of Maine to anchor in depths of up to 140 fathoms (840 feet; 256 meters) to measure currents. The Survey's requirement to update sailing directions led to the development of early current measurement technology, particularly the Pillsbury current meter invented by John E. Pillsbury, USN, while on duty with the Survey. It was in connection with intensive studies of the Gulf Stream that the Coast and Geodetic Survey ship USC&GS George S. Blake became such a pioneer in oceanography that she is one of only two U.S. ships with her name inscribed in the façade of the Oceanographic Museum (Musée Océanographique) in Monaco due to her being "the most innovative oceanographic vessel of the Nineteenth Century" with development of deep ocean exploration through introduction of steel cable for sounding, dredging and deep anchoring and data collection for the "first truly modern bathymetric map of a deep sea area."

=== Mid-1880s crisis ===
By the mid-1880s, the Coast and Geodetic Survey had been caught up in the increased scrutiny of U.S. government agencies by politicians seeking to reform governmental affairs by curbing the spoils system and patronage common among office holders of the time. One outgrowth of this movement was the Allison Commission – a joint commission of the United States Senate and United States House of Representatives – which convened in 1884 to investigate the scientific agencies of the U.S. government, namely the Coast and Geodetic Survey, the United States Geological Survey, the United States Army Signal Corps (responsible for studying and predicting weather at the time), and the United States Navy's United States Hydrographic Office. The commission looked into three main issues: the role of geodesy in the U.S. government's scientific efforts and whether responsibility for inland geodetics should reside in the U.S. Coast and Geodetic Survey or the U.S. Geological Survey; whether the Coast and Geodetic Survey should be removed from the Department of the Treasury and placed under the control of the Department of the Navy, as it had been previously from 1834 to 1836; and whether weather services should reside in a military organization or in the civilian part of the government, raising the broader issue of whether U.S. government scientific agencies of all kinds should be under military or civilian control.

At the Coast and Geodetic Survey, at least some scientists were not prone to following bureaucratic requirements related to the funding of their projects, and their lax financial practices led to charges of mismanagement of funds and corruption. When Grover Cleveland became president in 1885, James Q. Chenoweth became First Auditor of the Department of the Treasury, and he began to investigate improprieties at the U.S. Coast and Geodetic Survey, U.S. Geological Survey, and United States Commission of Fish and Fisheries, more commonly referred to as the United States Fish Commission. He had little impact on the Geological Survey or the Fish Commission, but at the Coast and Geodetic Survey he found many improprieties. Chenoweth found that the Coast and Geodetic Survey had failed to account for government equipment it had purchased, continued to pay retired personnel as a way of giving them a pension even though the law did not provide for a pension system, paid employees whether they worked or not, and misused per diem money intended for the expenses of personnel in the field by paying per diem funds to employees who were not in the field as a way of augmenting their very low authorized wages and providing them with fair compensation. Chenoweth saw these practices as embezzlement. Chenoweth also suspected embezzlement in the Survey's practice of providing its employees with money in advance for large and expensive purchases when operating in remote areas because of the Survey's inability to verify that the expenses were legitimate. Moreover, the Superintendent of the Coast and Geodetic Survey, Julius Hilgard, was exposed as a drunkard and forced to resign in disgrace along with four of his senior staff members at Survey headquarters.

To address issues at the Coast and Geodetic Survey raised by the Allison Commission and the Chenoweth investigation, Cleveland made the Chief Clerk of the Internal Revenue Bureau, Frank Manly Thorn, Acting Superintendent of the Coast and Geodetic Survey on July 23, 1885, and appointed him as the permanent superintendent on September 1. Thorn, a lawyer and journalist who was the first non-scientist to serve as superintendent, quickly concluded that the charges against Coast and Geodetic Survey personnel largely were overblown, and he set his mind to the issues of rebuilding the Survey's integrity and reputation and ensuring that it demonstrated its value to its critics. Ignorant of the Survey's operations and the scientific methods that lay behind them, he left such matters to his assistant, Benjamin J. Colonna, and focused instead on reforming the Survey's financial and budgetary procedures and improving its operations so as to demonstrate the value of its scientific program in performing accurate mapping while setting and meeting production deadlines for maps and charts.

To the Survey's critics, Thorn and Colonna championed the importance of the Coast and Geodetic Survey's inland geodetic work and how it supported, rather than duplicated, the work of the Geological Survey and was in any event an important component of the Coast and Geodetic Survey's hydrographic work along the coasts. Thorn also advocated civilian control of the Coast and Geodetic Survey, pointing out to Cleveland and others that earlier experiments with placing it under U.S. Navy control had fared poorly. Thorn described the Coast and Geodetic Survey's essential mission as, in its simplest form, to produce "a perfect map,". and to this end he and Colonna championed the need for the Survey to focus on the broad range of geodetic disciplines Colonna identified as necessary for accurate chart- and mapmaking: triangulation, astronomical observations, levelling, tidal observations, physical geodesy, topography, hydrography, and magnetic observations. To those who advocated transfer of the Coast and Geodetic Survey's work to the Navy Hydrographic Office, Thorn and Colonna replied that although the Navy could perform hydrography, it could not provide the full range of geodetic disciplines necessary for scientifically accurate surveying and mapping work.

In 1886, the Allison Commission wrapped up its investigation and published its final report. Although it determined that all topographic responsibility outside of coastal areas would henceforth reside in the U.S. Geological Survey, it approved of the Coast and Geodetic Survey continuing its entire program of scientific research, and recommended that the Coast and Geodetic Survey remain under civilian control rather than be subordinated to the U.S. Navy. It was a victory for Thorn and Colonna. Another victory followed in 1887, when Thorn headed off a congressional attempt to subordinate the Survey to the Navy despite the Allison Commission's findings, providing Cleveland with information on the previous lack of success of such an arrangement. When Thorn left the superintendency in 1889, the Coast and Geodetic Survey's position in the U.S. government had become secure.

Before Thorn left the superintendency, the United States Congress passed a bill requiring that henceforth the president would select the superintendent of the Coast and Geodetic Survey with the consent of the U.S. Senate. This practice has continued for senior positions in the Coast and Geodetic Survey and its successor organizations ever since.

=== Later 19th century and early 20th century ===
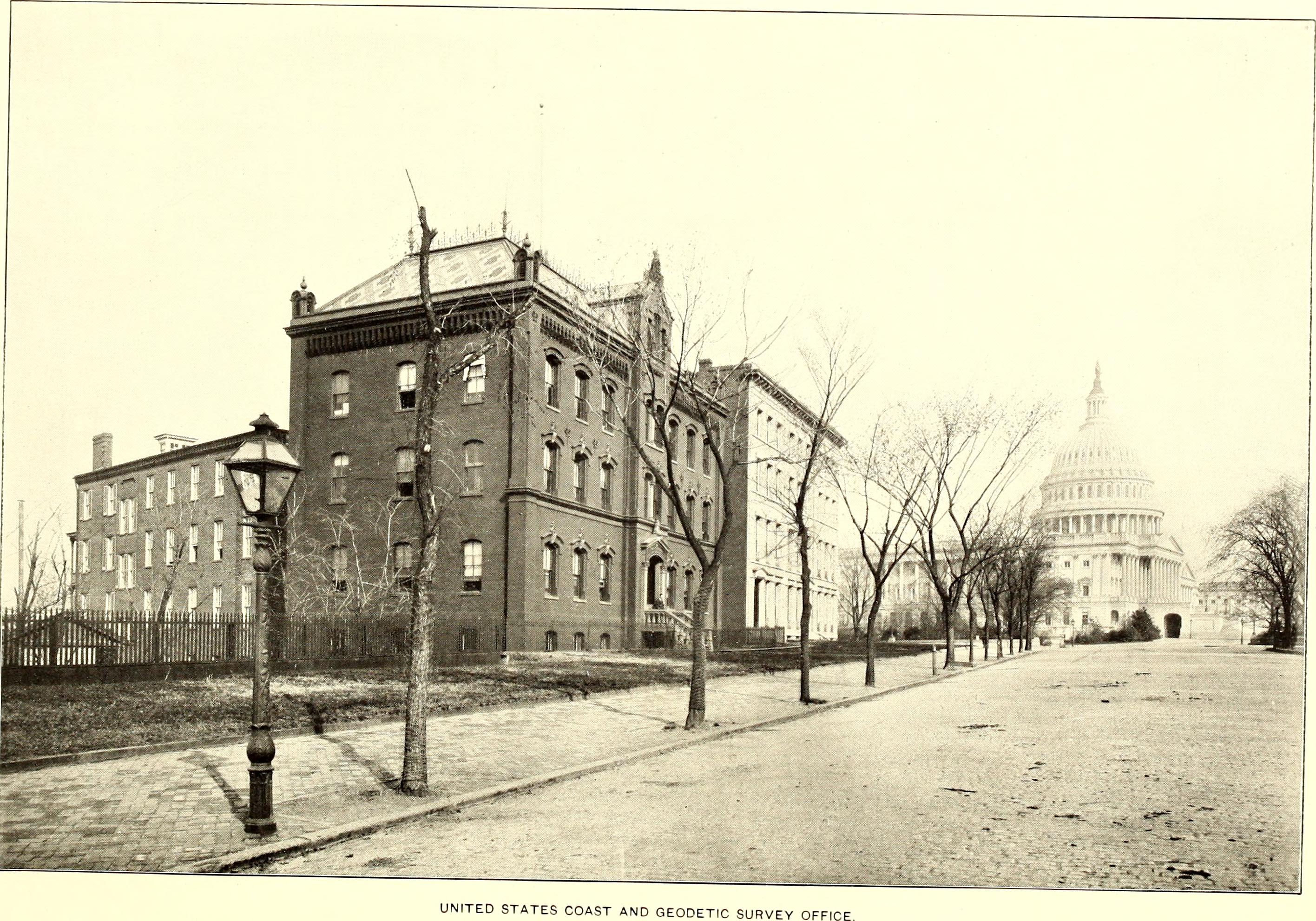
Coast and Geodetic Survey headquarters—the Richards Building—in 1902, with the United States Capitol visible in the distance.

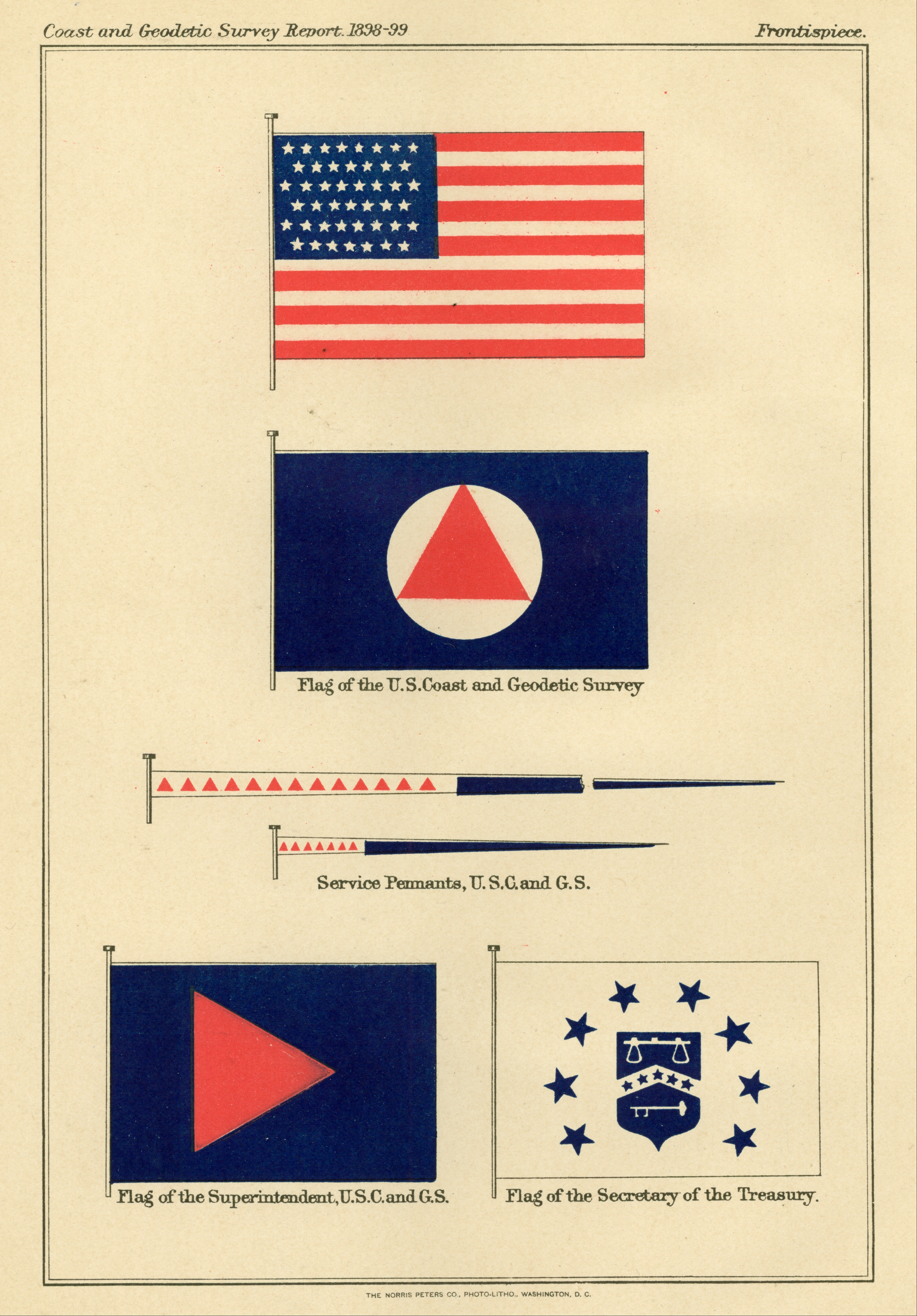
Excerpt from the 1898-1899 U.S. Coast and Geodetic Survey service report, showing the flags and flown by the Survey's ships, including the national ensign; the first official authorized flag of the U.S. Coast and Geodetic Survey, adopted in 1899; commissioning pennants; the flag of the superintendent; and the flag of the United States Secretary of Commerce. The triangle in the center of the Survey flag symbolizes triangulation in surveying.

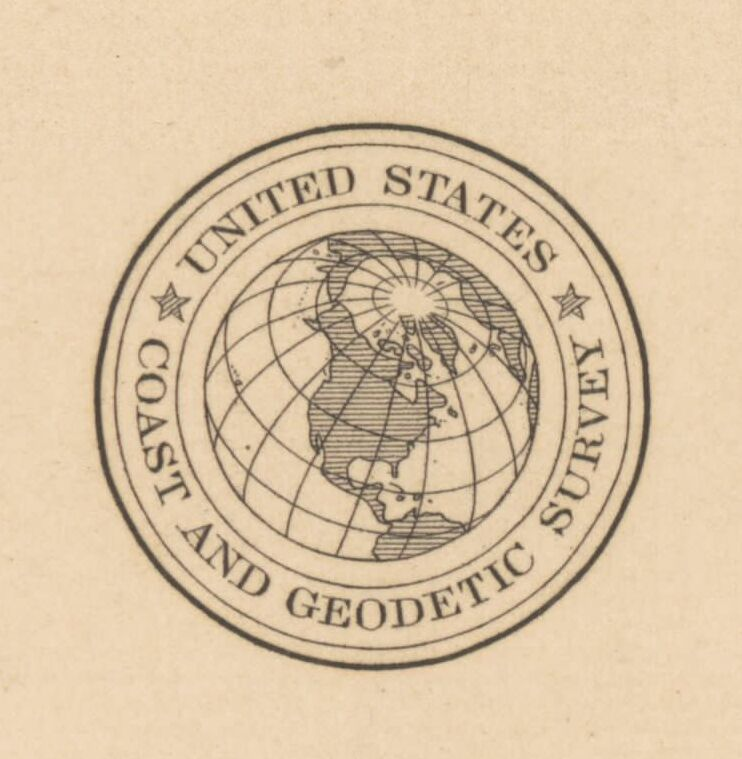
United States Coast and Geodetic Survey emblem from 1891 map

On February 5, 1889, by a joint resolution of Congress, the U.S. government accepted an invitation by the government of the German Empire to become a party to the International Geodetic Association. By law, the U.S. delegate to the association was a Coast and Geodetic Survey officer appointed by the President. By a resolution of April 12, 1892, Congress granted the use of the facilities of the Coast and Geodetic Survey for research and study by scientific investigators and students of any institution of higher education.

On April 5, 1893, Survey Superintendent Thomas Corwin Mendenhall, with the approval of United States Secretary of the Treasury John Griffin Carlisle, formally issued the Mendenhall Order, which required the Office of Weights and Measures to change the fundamental standards of length and mass of the United States from the customary English system to the metric system. The metric standards defined under the order remained the U.S. standard until July 1, 1959, by which time increasing precision in measurement required their revision.

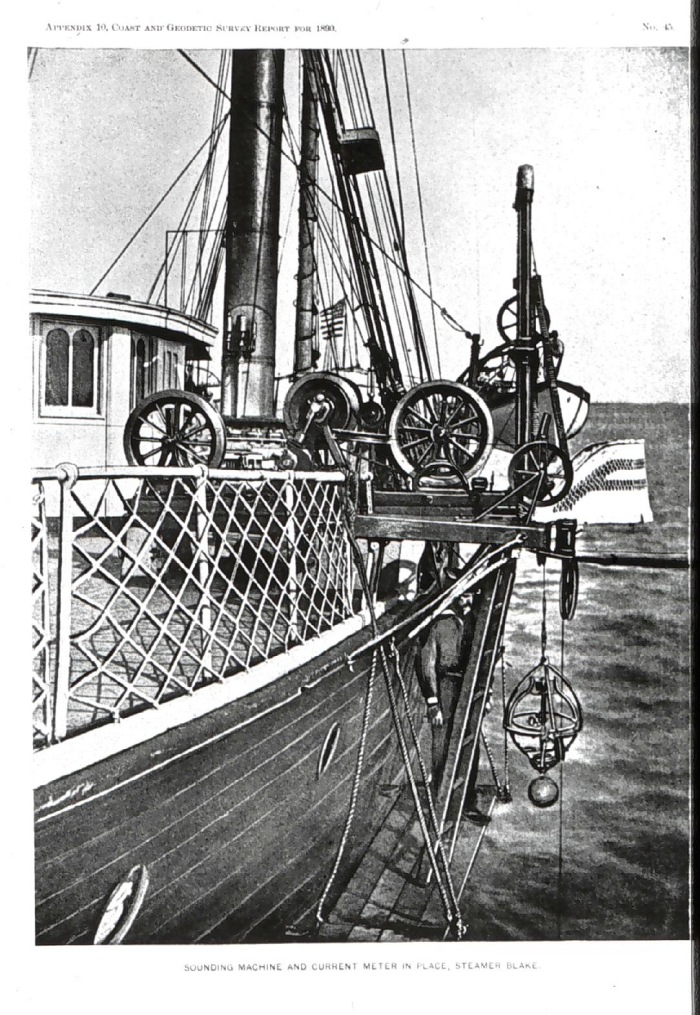
Sigsbee Sounding Machine – invented by Charles Dwight Sigsbee and modified from the Thomson Sounding Machine. Basic design of ocean sounding instruments stayed the same for the next 50 years. Here the sounding machine is used to set a Pillsbury current meter at a known depth. In: The Gulf Stream, by John Elliott Pillsbury, 1891. Note caption on photo: "Sounding Machine And Current Meter In Place, Steamer Blake."

During the 1890s, while attached to the Coast and Geodetic Survey as commanding officer of George S. Blake, Lieutenant Commander Charles Dwight Sigsbee, USN, Assistant in the Coast Survey, (Note: The formal title given these officers in reports is for example: "Lieut. Commander John A. Howell, U.S.N., Assistant in the Coast Survey" with "Assistant" being a title for both high office and topographic survey management positions and ship's commanding officers.) developed the Sigsbee sounding machine while conducting the first true bathymetric surveys in the Gulf of Mexico.

With the outbreak of the Spanish–American War in April 1898, the U.S. Navy again withdrew its officers from Coast and Geodetic Survey duty. As a result of the war, which ended in August 1898, the United States took control of the Philippine Islands and Puerto Rico, and surveying their waters became part of the Coast and Geodetic Survey's duties. The Survey opened a field office in Seattle, Washington in 1899, to support survey ships operating in the Pacific Ocean as well as survey field expeditions in the western United States; this office eventually would become the modern National Oceanic and Atmospheric Administration Pacific Marine Center.

The system of U.S. Navy officers and men crewing the Survey's ships that had prevailed for most of the 19th century came to an end when the appropriation law approved on June 6, 1900, provided for "all necessary employees to man and equip the vessels" instead of Navy personnel. The law went into effect on July 1, 1900; at that point, all Navy personnel assigned to the Survey's ships remained aboard until the first call at each ship's home port, where they transferred off, with the Survey reimbursing the Navy for their pay accrued after July 1, 1900. Thereafter, the Coast and Geodetic Survey operated as an entirely civilian organization until May 1917.

In 1901, the Office of Weights and Measures was split off from the Coast and Geodetic Survey to become the separate National Bureau of Standards. It became the National Institute of Standards and Technology in 1988.

In 1903, the Coast and Geodetic Survey was transferred from the Department of the Treasury to the newly created United States Department of Commerce and Labor. By the time of its transfer, the Survey had established suboffices at San Francisco, California, and at Manila in the Philippines and had expanded the scope of its operations to include Lake Champlain, the Pacific coast of North America from San Diego, California, to Panama, a transcontinental triangulation between the United States East and West Coasts, the Hawaiian Islands, Alaska, and "other coasts under the jurisdiction of the United States," which by then also included the Philippines, Guam, American Samoa, and Puerto Rico. In 1903, the Organization and Law of the Department of Commerce and Labor stated that from the time the Survey began scientific activities in the early 19th century it had produced "a stimulus to all educational and scientific work. The methods used by the Survey have been the standard for similar undertakings in the United States, and many commendations of their excellence have been received from abroad. The influence of the Survey in the various operations resulting from the advancing scientific activity of the country can hardly be overestimated."

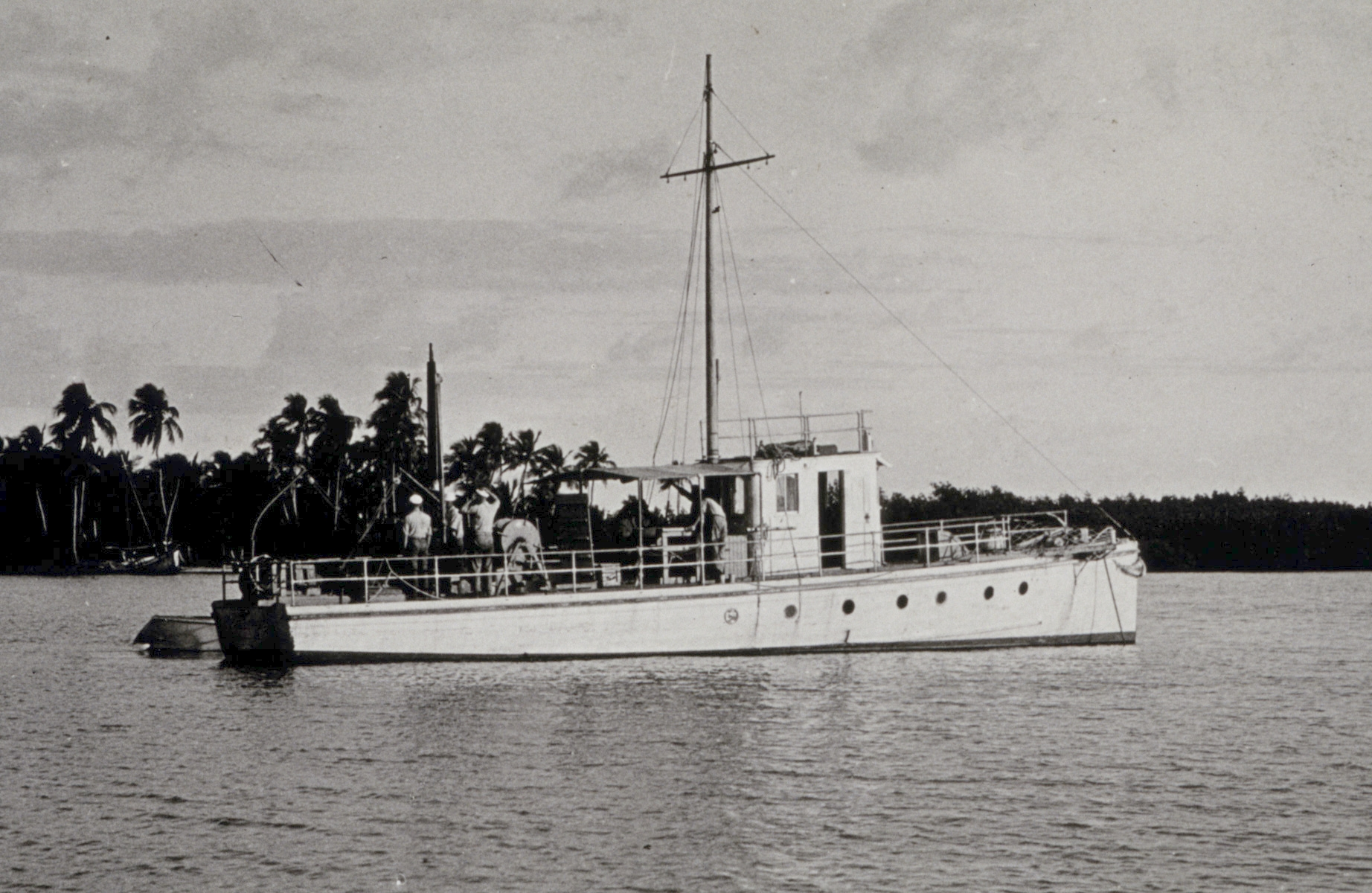
A wire-drag boat in Puerto Rico in 1921.

In 1904, the Coast and Geodetic Survey introduced the wire-drag technique into hydrography, in which a wire attached to two ships or boats and set at a certain depth by a system of weights and buoys was dragged between two points. This method revolutionized hydrographic surveying, as it allowed a quicker, less laborious, and far more complete survey of an area than did the use of lead lines and sounding poles that had preceded it, and it remained in use until the late 1980s.

The Department of Commerce and Labor was abolished in 1913 and divided into the United States Department of Commerce and the United States Department of Labor. With this change, the Coast and Geodetic Survey came under the jurisdiction of the Department of Commerce.

=== World War I ===
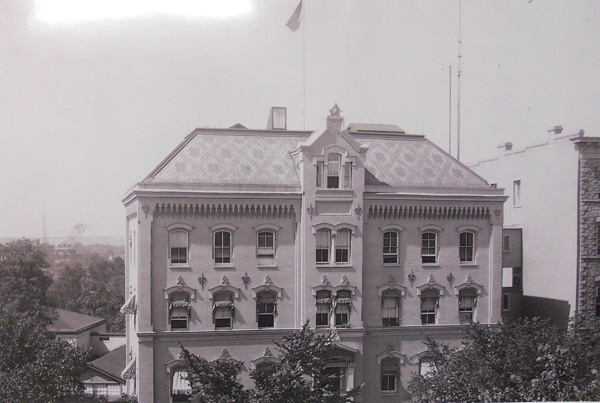
The Richards Building in 1923. It served as Coast and Geodetic Survey headquarters from 1871 to 1929.

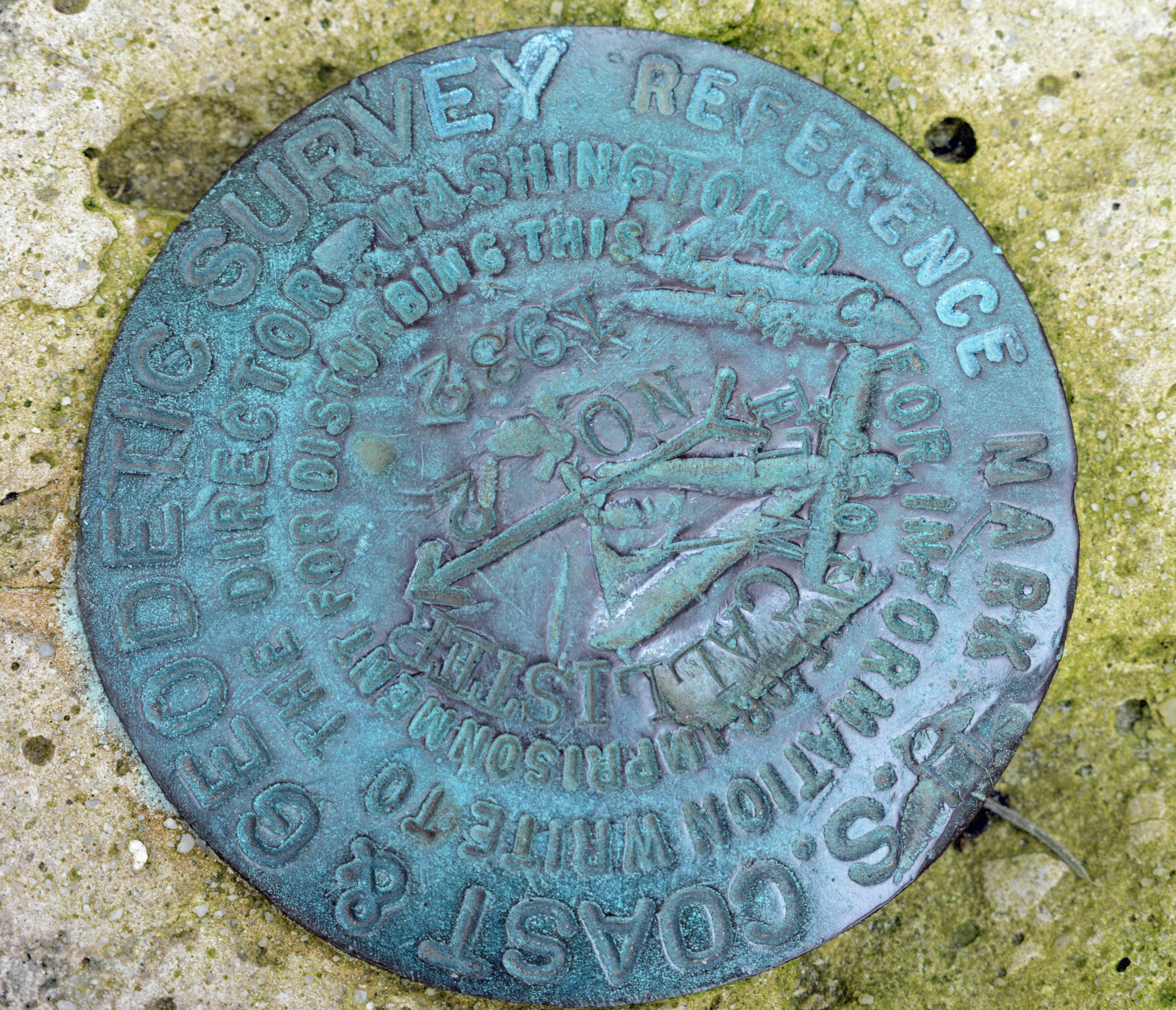
A 1932 marker at Fort McAllister Historic Park in Bryan County, Georgia.

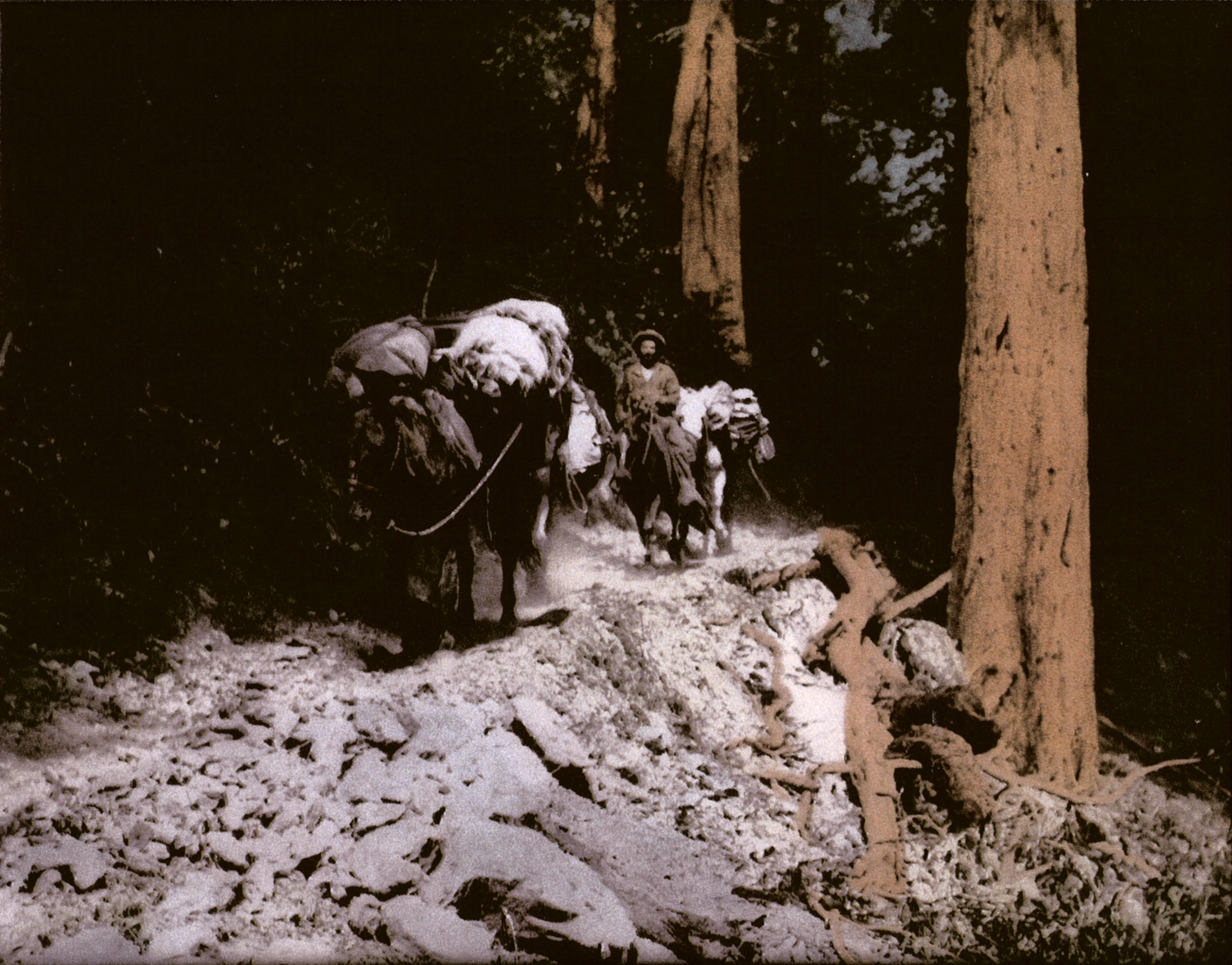
A Coast and Geodetic Survey pack train, part of a survey team, in redwoods in Palo Colorado Canyon in California in 1932.

Although some personnel aboard Coast and Geodetic Survey ships wore uniforms virtually identical to those of the U.S. Navy, the Survey operated as a completely civilian organization from 1900 until after the United States entered World War I in April 1917. To avoid the dangerous situation Coast Survey personnel had faced during the American Civil War, when they could have been executed as spies if captured by the enemy, a new Coast and Geodetic Survey Corps was created on May 22, 1917, as one of the uniformed services of the United States, giving the Survey's officers a commissioned status that protected them from treatment as spies if captured, as well as providing the United States armed forces with a ready source of officers skilled in surveying that could be rapidly assimilated for wartime support of the armed forces.

Over half of all Coast and Geodetic Survey Corps officers served in the U.S. Army, U.S. Navy, and U.S. Marine Corps during World War I, and Coast and Geodetic Survey personnel were active as artillery orienteering officers, as minelaying officers in the North Sea (where they supported the laying of the North Sea Mine Barrage), as troop transport navigators, as intelligence officers, and as officers on the staff of U.S. Army General John "Black Jack" Pershing, commander of the American Expeditionary Forces on the Western Front.

=== Interwar period ===
During the period between the world wars, the Coast and Geodetic Survey returned to its peaceful scientific and surveying pursuits, including land surveying, sea floor charting, coastline mapping, geophysics, and oceanography. In 1923 and 1924, it began the use of acoustic sounding systems and developed radio acoustic ranging, which was the first marine navigation system in history that did not rely on a visual means of position determination. These developments led to the Survey's 1924 discovery of the sound fixing and ranging (SOFAR) channel or deep sound channel (DSC) – a horizontal layer of water in the ocean at which depth the speed of sound is at its minimum – and to the development of telemetering radio sonobuoys and marine seismic exploration techniques. The Air Commerce Act, which went into effect on May 20, 1926, among other things directed that the airways of the United States be charted for the first time and assigned this mission to the Coast and Geodetic Survey.

In 1933, the Coast and Geodetic Survey opened a ship base in Norfolk, Virginia. From 1934 to 1937, it organized surveying parties and field offices to employ over 10,000 people, including many unemployed engineers, during the height of the Great Depression.

=== World War II ===
When the United States entered World War II in December 1941, all of this work was suspended as the Survey dedicated its activities entirely to support of the war effort. Over half of the Coast and Geodetic Corps commissioned officers were transferred to either the U.S. Army, U.S. Navy, U.S. Marine Corps, or United States Army Air Forces, while those who remained in the Coast and Geodetic Survey also operated in support of military and naval requirements. About half of the Survey's civilian work force, slightly over 1,000 people, joined the armed services.

Officers and civilians of the Survey saw service in North Africa, Europe, and the Pacific and in the defense of North America and its waters, serving as artillery surveyors, hydrographers, amphibious engineers, beachmasters (i.e., directors of disembarkation), instructors at service schools, and in a wide range of technical positions. Coast and Geodetic Survey personnel also worked as reconnaissance surveyors for a worldwide aeronautical charting effort, and a Coast and Geodetic Survey Corps officer was the first commanding officer of the Army Air Forces Aeronautical Chart Plant at St. Louis, Missouri. Coast and Geodetic Survey civilians who remained in the United States during the war produced over 100 million maps and charts for the Allied forces. Three Coast and Geodetic Survey officers and eleven members of the agency who had joined other services were killed during the war.

=== Post–World War II ===
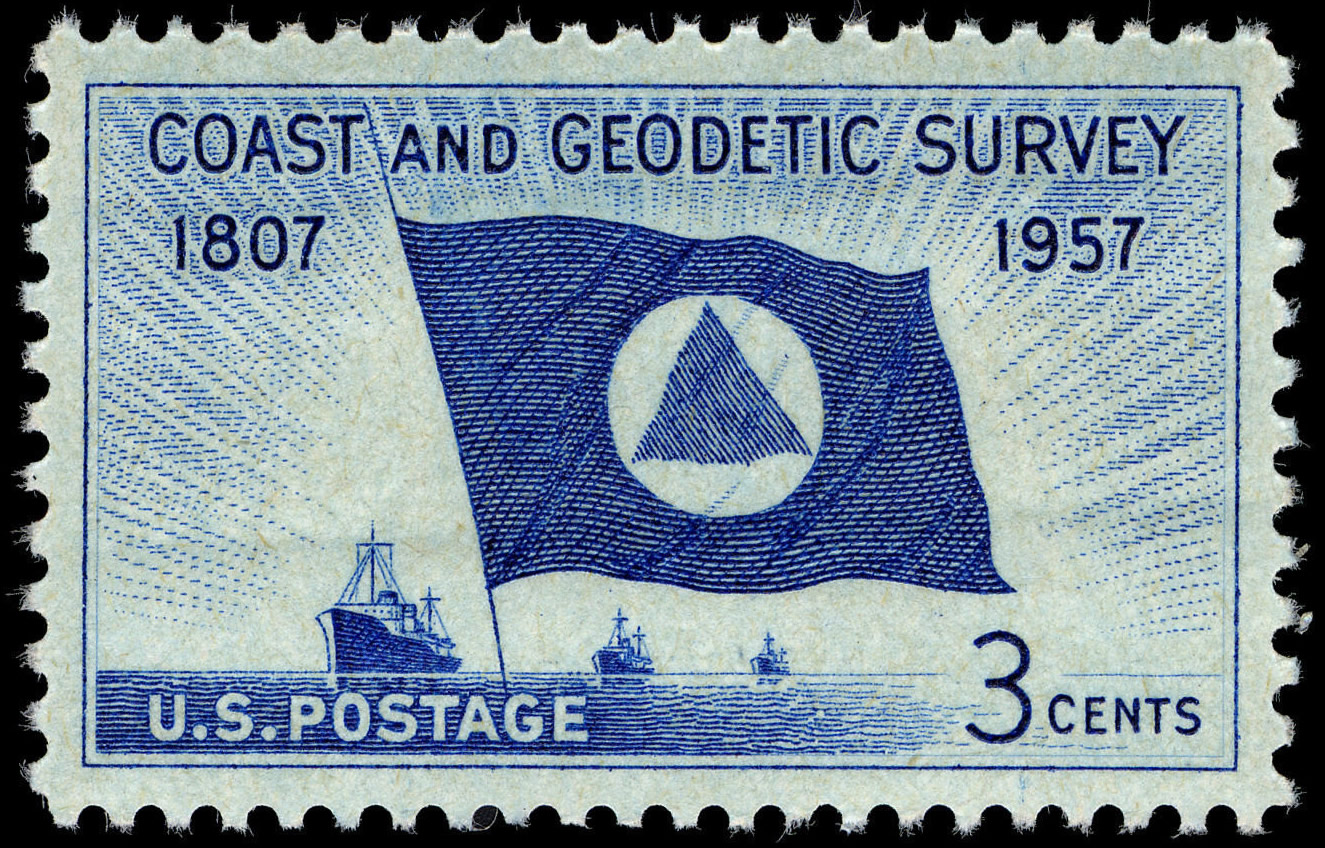
150th anniversary commemorative stamp, issued by the United States Post Office Department in 1957.

Following World War II, the Coast and Geodetic Survey resumed its peacetime scientific and surveying efforts. In 1945 it adapted the British Royal Air Force's Gee radio navigation system to hydrographic surveying, ushering in a new era of marine electronic navigation. In 1948 it established the Pacific Tsunami Warning Center in Honolulu Hawaii. The onset of the Cold War in the late 1940s led the Survey also to make a significant effort in support of defense requirements, such as conducting surveys for the Distant Early Warning Line and for rocket ranges, performing oceanographic work for the U.S. Navy, and monitoring nuclear tests.

In 1955, the Coast and Geodetic Survey ship USC&GS Pioneer (OSS 31) conducted a survey in the Pacific Ocean off the United States West Coast towing a magnetometer invented by the Scripps Institution of Oceanography. The first such survey in history, it discovered magnetic striping on the seafloor, a key finding in the development of the theory of plate tectonics.

The Coast and Geodetic Survey participated in the International Geophysical Year (IGY) of July 1, 1957, to December 31, 1958. During the IGY, 67 countries cooperated in a worldwide effort to collect, share, and study data on eleven Earth sciences – aurora and airglow, cosmic rays, geomagnetism, gravity, ionospheric physics, longitude and latitude determinations for precision mapping, meteorology, oceanography, seismology, and solar activity.

In 1959, the Coast and Geodetic Survey's charter was extended to give it the responsibility for U.S. government oceanographic studies worldwide. In 1963, it became the first U.S. government scientific agency to take part in an international cooperative oceanographic/meteorological project when the survey ship USC&GS Explorer (OSS 28) made a scientific cruise in support of the EQUALANT I and EQUALANT II subprojects of the International Cooperative Investigations of the Tropical Atlantic (ICITA) project. In 1964, a Coast and Geodetic Survey ship operated in the Indian Ocean for the first time, when Pioneer took part in the International Indian Ocean Expedition, an international effort to study the Indian Ocean that lasted from 1959 to 1965.

=== ESSA years ===
On July 13, 1965, the Environmental Science Services Administration (ESSA), was established within the Department of Commerce and became the new parent organization of both the Coast and Geodetic Survey and the United States Weather Bureau. At the same time, the Coast and Geodetic Survey Corps was removed from the Survey's direct control, subordinated directly to ESSA, and renamed the Environmental Science Services Administration Corps, or "ESSA Corps." As the ESSA Corps, it retained the responsibility of providing commissioned officers to man Coast and Geodetic Survey ships.

=== Creation of NOAA ===
On October 3, 1970, ESSA was abolished and its components were reorganized and merged with those of other U.S. government agencies to form the National Oceanic and Atmospheric Administration (NOAA), a new component of the Department of Commerce. The Coast and Geodetic Survey was abolished that day as it merged with other government scientific agencies to form NOAA.

=== Legacy ===
Under NOAA, the Coast and Geodetic Survey's constituent parts lived on. Its geodetic responsibilities were assigned under NOAA's National Ocean Survey (NOS) to the new National Geodetic Survey, its hydrographic survey duties to the NOS's new Office of Coast Survey, and its ships to the NOS itself, while the ESSA Corps became the new National Oceanic and Atmospheric Administration Commissioned Officer Corps, or "NOAA Corps". Via a phased process during 1972 and 1973, the ships of the NOS joined ships temporarily assigned to NOAA's National Marine Fisheries Service or the Environmental Research Laboratories in forming a consolidated and unified NOAA fleet, operated by the National Ocean Survey's Office of Fleet Operations. The National Ocean Survey was renamed the National Ocean Service in 1983, and thus the National Ocean Service, National Geodetic Survey, Office of Coast Survey, and NOAA Corps all trace their ancestry to the United States Coast and Geodetic Survey, and the NOAA fleet does in part as well. Outside NOAA, the U.S. Department of Commerce's National Institute of Standards and Technology, although long separated from the Coast and Geodetic Survey, traces its ancestry to the Coast and Geodetic Survey's Office of Standard Weights and Measures.

== Coast and Geodetic Survey leadership ==
The senior leader of the Survey of the Coast, Coast Survey, and Coast and Geodetic Survey held the title of "superintendent" until 1919, when the title changed to "director." Eleven men served as superintendent and seven as director.

=== Superintendents (1816–1919) ===
No.	Portrait	Name	Tenure	Notes
1		Ferdinand Rudolph Hassler (1770–1843)	1816–1818; 1832–1843	Superintendency interrupted from 1818 to 1832 by Congressional prohibition of the employment of civilians by the Survey of the Coast. Survey renamed United States Coast survey in 1836.
2		Alexander Dallas Bache (1806–1867)	1843–1867	
3		Benjamin Peirce (1809–1880)	1867–1874	
4		Carlile Pollock Patterson (1816–1881)	1874–1881	United States Coast Survey renamed United States Coast and Geodetic Survey in 1878.
5		Julius Erasmus Hilgard (1825–1891)	1881–1885	
6		Frank Manly Thorn (1836–1907)	1885–1889	First non-scientist to serve as superintendent.
7		Thomas Corwin Mendenhall (1841–1924)	1889–1894	
8		William Ward Duffield (1823–1907)	1894–1897	
9		Henry Smith Pritchett (1857–1939)	1897–1900	
10		Otto Hilgard Tittmann (1850–1938)	1900–1915	
11		Ernest Lester Jones (1876–1929)	1915–1919	Became Director of the U.S. Coast and Geodetic Survey in 1919. Also served as Director of the Coast and Geodetic Survey Corps from 1917 to 1929.

=== Directors (1919–1970) ===
No.	Portrait	Name	Tenure	Notes
1		Ernest Lester Jones (1876–1929)	1919–1929	Previously Superintendent of the U.S. Coast and Geodetic Survey from 1915 to 1919. Also Director of the Coast and Geodetic Survey Corps from 1917 to 1929.
2		Captain/Rear Admiral; Raymond S. Patton (1882–1937)	1929–1937	Also Director of the Coast and Geodetic Survey Corps from 1929 until 1937. Promoted from captain to rear admiral in 1936.
3		Rear Admiral; Leo O. Colbert (1883–1968)	1938–1950	Also Director of the Coast and Geodetic Survey Corps from 1938 to 1950.
4		Rear Admiral; Robert F.A. Studds (1896–1962)	1950–1955	Also Directorof the Coast and Geodetic Survey Corps from 1950 to 1955.
5		Rear Admiral; H. Arnold Karo (1903–1986)	1955–1965	Also Director of the Coast and Geodetic Survey Corps from 1955 to 1965.
6		Rear Admiral; James C. Tison Jr. (1908–1991)	1965–1968	Also Director of the ESSA Corps from 1965 to 1968.
7		Rear Admiral; Don A. Jones (1912–2000)	1968–1970	Also Director of the ESSA Corps from 1968 to 1970. Later was the first Director of the National Ocean Survey from 1970 to 1972.

=== Superintendents of Weights and Measures ===
In 1830, the U.S. Congress established the position of "Superintendent of Standard Weights and Measures" and assigned this duty ex officio to the Superintendent of the U.S. Coast Survey (after 1878 the U.S. Coast and Geodetic Survey). In 1843, Superintendent Alexander Dallas Bache turned over executive responsibility for the direction of the Coast Survey's Office of Standard Weights and Measures — including its day-to-day operations, technical engineering work, and the physical custody of measurement standards — to a dedicated "Assistant in Charge" or "Inspector." This position was styled as the "Superintendent of Weights and Measures" both in common usage and official documents, although the Survey's superintendent retained the legal responsibility for oversight of weights and measures and the office remained subordinate to the Survey and its superintendent. This persisted until 3 March 1901, when a reorganization removed the Office of Standard Weights and Measures from the Coast and Geodetic Survey and established it as an independent agency, the National Bureau of Standards (renamed the National Institute of Standards and Technology in 1988).

No.	Portrait	Name	Tenure	Notes
1		Ferdinand Rudolph Hassler (1770–1843)	1830–1843	Also Superintendent of the Survey of the Coast from 1816 to 1818 and from 1832 to 1836, and then of the United States Coast Survey from 1836 to 1843.
2		Joseph Saxton (1799–1873)	1843–1873	
3		Julius Erasmus Hilgard (1825–1891)	1873–1881	Later Superintendent of the United States Coast and Geodetic Survey from 1881 to 1885.
4		Otto Hilgard Tittmann (1850–1938)	1889–1899	Later Superintendent of the United States Coast and Geodetic Survey from 1900 to 1915. From the mid-1890s, Tittman delegated management of the day-to-day adjustment and calibration of standards to physicist Louis A. Fischer.
5		Samuel Wesley Stratton (1861–1931)	1899–1901	Served as first director of the National Bureau of Standards (1901–1923)

=== Directors of the Coast and Geodetic Survey Corps (1917–1965) ===
1. Colonel Ernest Lester Jones (1917–1929)
2. Captain/Rear Admiral Raymond Stanton Patton (1929–1937)
3. Rear Admiral Leo Otis Colbert (1938–1950)
4. Rear Admiral Robert Francis Anthony Studds (1950–1955)
5. Rear Admiral Henry Arnold Karo (1955–1965)

== Ranks ==
Relative rank of Coast and Geodetic Survey officers in 1918

As of 1917, if the President of the United States transferred the Coast and Geodetic Survey during a national emergency from the U.S. Department of Commerce to either the U.S. Department of War or the U.S. Department of the Navy, commissioned officers of the Coast and Geodetic Survey assumed the following relative ranks while serving under U.S. Army, U.S. Navy, U.S. Marine Corps, or United States Coast Guard control:

Grade	Title	Rank with and after (Army and Marine Corps)	Rank with and after (Navy)	Rank with and after (Coast Guard)
1	Hydrographic and Geodetic Engineer	Colonel	Captain	Captain-Commandant
2	Hydrographic and Geodetic Engineer	Lieutenant Colonel	Commander	Senior Captain
3	Hydrographic and Geodetic Engineer	Major	Lieutenant Commander	Captain
4	Hydrographic and Geodetic Engineer	Captain	Lieutenant	First lieutenant
5	Junior Hydrographic and Geodetic Engineer	First Lieutenant	Lieutenant (junior grade)	Second Lieutenant
6	Aid	Second Lieutenant	Ensign	Third Lieutenant

Upon transfer of the Coast and Geodetic Survey to U.S. War Department or U.S. Navy Department control, its civilian ship's officers—engineers, ship's surgeons, watch officers, mates, and deck officers—received commissions in either the United States Army Reserve or United States Naval Reserve Force commensurate with their qualifications.

Coast and Geodetic Survey Ranks in 1943

Commissioned officers	Ship's officers
Rear Admiral	–
Captain	–
Commander	–
Lieutenant Commander	–
Lieutenant	Chief Marine Engineer; Ship's Surgeon
Lieutenant (junior grade)	Mate
Ensign	Deck Officer

Petty officer ranks were chief petty officer, petty officer first class, petty officer second class, and petty officer third class.

== Awards and decorations ==
Coast and Geodetic Survey Corps officers, as well as other Coast and Geodetic Survey personnel such as civilian ship's officers and crew members, were eligible for United States Department of Commerce awards as well as the awards and decorations of other uniformed services with which they served. However, although the Coast and Geodetic Survey traced its history to 1807, it had no awards of its own until 21 July 1945, when President Harry S. Truman signed Executive Order 9590, authorizing six awards in recognition of Coast and Geodetic Survey service during World War II, the national emergency preceding it, or its aftermath.

For budgetary reasons, Executive Order 9590 established the awards as ribbons only, but it also authorized the United States Secretary of Commerce to "provide and issue an appropriate medal, with suitable appurtenances, to the recipient of any ribbon at such time as he may determine, and when necessary funds are available therefore." However, it was not until after the United States Congress passed the Merchant Marine Decorations and Medals Act in 1988 that the National Oceanic and Atmospheric Administration (NOAA), as the Coast and Geodetic Survey's successor organization, took action to create a medal for each of the awards. Later in 1988, via NOAA Corps Bulletin 880401, NOAA authorized medals to supplement the ribbons previously awarded.

A member of the Coast and Geodetic Survey was eligible to receive each ribbon only once during his career, although he was authorized to wear a ribbon device indicating each additional deed or service justifying a similar award. Except for the Coast and Geodetic Survey Good Conduct Medal, the awards were authorized only for service under the jurisdiction of the United States Secretary of Commerce; Coast and Geodetic Survey personnel were not eligible for these awards for their service during periods that they were under the jurisdiction of the United States Department of War or United States Department of the Navy.

- Coast and Geodetic Survey Distinguished Service Medal
  Awarded to any Coast and Geodetic Survey commissioned officer or to any ship's officer or member of the crew of any Coast and Geodetic Survey ship who distinguished himself by outstanding conduct or service in the line of duty between 8 September 1939 and 28 April 1952.
- Coast and Geodetic Survey Meritorious Service Medal
  Awarded to any Coast and Geodetic Survey commissioned officer or to any ship's officer or member of the crew of any Coast and Geodetic Survey ship who rendered service of a meritorious character between September 8, 1939 and April 28, 1952 but not of such an outstanding character as would warrant an award of the Coast and Geodetic Survey Distinguished Service Medal.
- Coast and Geodetic Survey Good Conduct Medal
  Awarded to enlisted members of the crews of Coast and Geodetic Survey vessels for exemplary behavior, efficiency, and fidelity during service between 8 September 1939 and 28 April 1952.
- Coast and Geodetic Survey Defense Service Medal
  Awarded to any Coast and Geodetic Survey commissioned officer or to any ship's officer or member of the crew of any Coast and Geodetic Survey ship who served at any time during the period between September 8, 1939 and 6 December 1941.
- Coast and Geodetic Survey Atlantic War Zone Medal
  Awarded to any Coast and Geodetic Survey commissioned officer or to any ship's officer or member of the crew of any Coast and Geodetic Survey ship who served outside the continental limits of the United States in the Atlantic War Zone between December 7, 1941 and 8 November 1945.
- Coast and Geodetic Survey Pacific War Zone Medal
  Awarded to any Coast and Geodetic Survey commissioned officer or to any ship's officer or member of the crew of any Coast and Geodetic Survey ship who served outside the continental limits of the United States in the Pacific War Zone between 7 December 1941 and 2 March 1946.

== Fleet ==
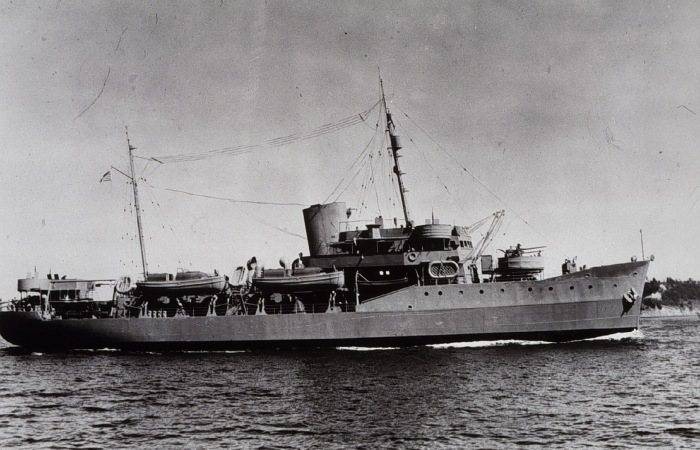
USC&GS Pathfinder (OSS 30) was transferred to the United States Navy while under construction and served in the Navy as USS Pathfinder (AGS-1) from 1942 to 1946 before being returned to the Coast and Geodetic Survey.

=== Fleet history ===
The Survey of the Coast's first ship, the schooner Jersey, was acquired for it in 1834 by the U.S. Department of the Navy. By purchasing commercial vessels, through transfers from the U.S. Navy and U.S. Revenue-Marine (renamed the U.S. Revenue Cutter Service in 1894), and later through construction of ships built specifically for the Survey, the Coast Survey and later the Coast and Geodetic Survey operated a fleet of ships until the formation of NOAA in October 1970.

During the Mexican War (1846–1848), the brig USRC Washington, a revenue cutter on loan from the U.S. Revenue-Marine, became the first Coast Survey ship to see U.S. Navy service. During the American Civil War (1861–1865), the Spanish–American War (1898), World War I (1917–1918), and World War II (1941–1945), some of the Survey's ships served in the U.S. Navy and U.S. Revenue-Marine, U.S. Revenue Cutter Service, or United States Coast Guard, while others supported the war effort while remaining part of the Survey's fleet.

The Coast and Geodetic Survey applied the abbreviation "USC&GS" as a prefix to the names of its ships, analogous to the "USS" abbreviation employed by the U.S. Navy. In the 20th century, the Coast and Geodetic Survey also instituted a hull classification symbol system similar to the one that the U.S. Navy began using in 1920. Each ship was classified as an "ocean survey ship" (OSS), "medium survey ship" (MSS), "coastal survey ship" (CSS), or "auxiliary survey vessel" (ASV), and assigned a unique hull number, the abbreviation for its type and its unique hull number combining to form its individual hull code. For example, the ocean survey ship Oceanographer that served from 1930 to 1942 was USC&GS Oceanographer (OSS 26), while the Oceanographer that served from 1966 to 1970 was USC&GS Oceanographer (OSS 01).

When the Environmental Science Services Administration (ESSA) was created in 1965, the Coast and Geodetic Survey came under its control but retained its distinct identity, continuing to operate its own fleet. When ESSA was abolished and NOAA replaced it on October 3, 1970, the Coast and Geodetic Survey was dissolved, and its ships were assigned to NOAA's National Ocean Survey (NOS), which later was renamed the National Ocean Service, while the fisheries research ships of the United States Fish and Wildlife Service's Bureau of Commercial Fisheries, abolished at the same time, temporarily were assigned to NOAA's National Marine Fisheries Service (NMFS). Via a phased process during 1972 and 1973, the ships temporarily assigned to the NOS or the NMFS joined ships formerly assigned to ESSA's Environmental Research Laboratories in forming a consolidated and unified NOAA fleet, operated by the National Ocean Survey's Office of Fleet Operations. For a time, NOAA continued to use the Coast and Geodetic Survey's classification system for its survey ships, but it later abandoned it and instituted a new classification scheme.

=== Ships ===
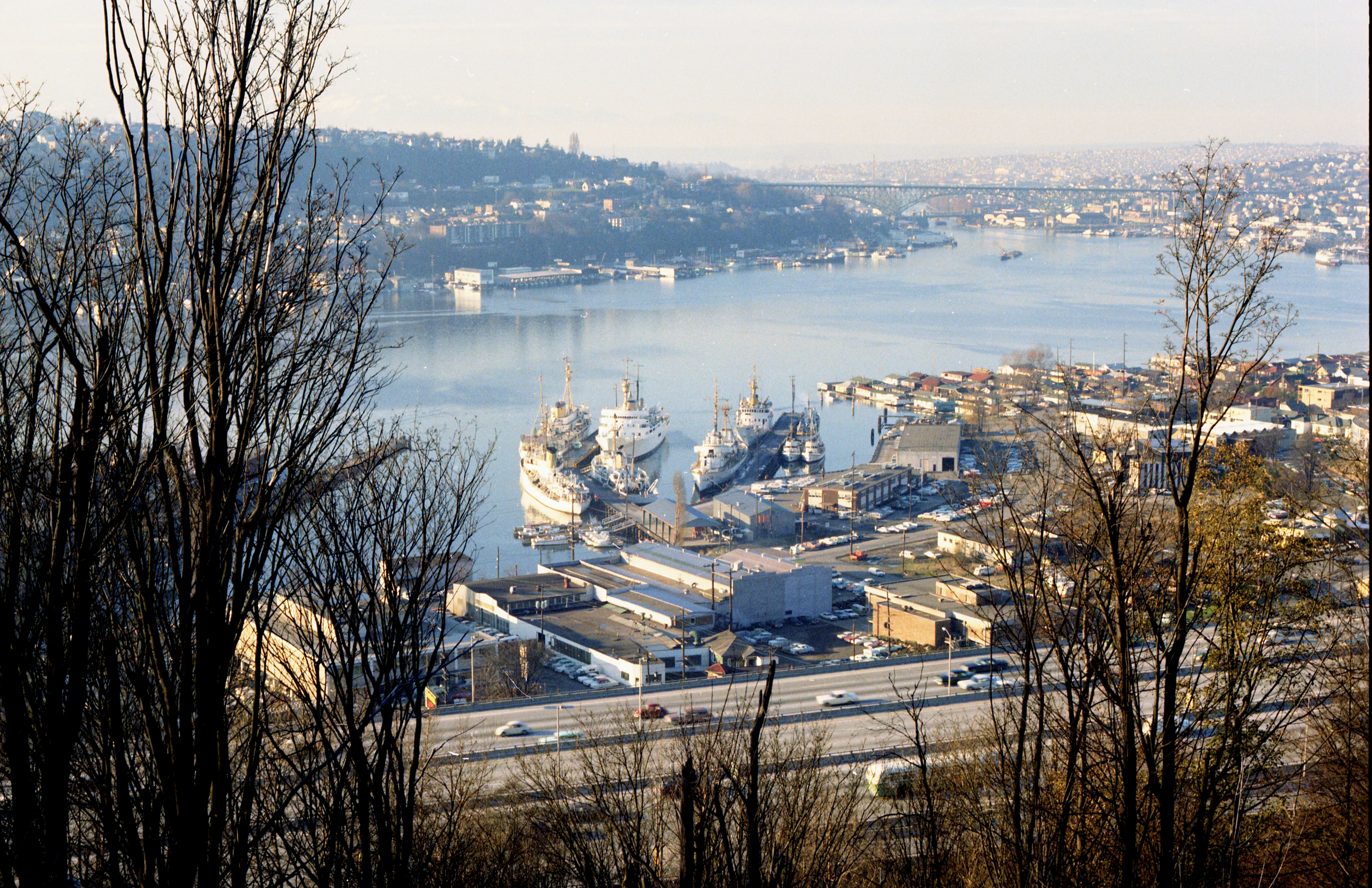
The Coast and Geodetic Survey base in Seattle, Washington, in 1967. It later became the National Oceanic and Atmospheric Administration's Pacific Marine Center.

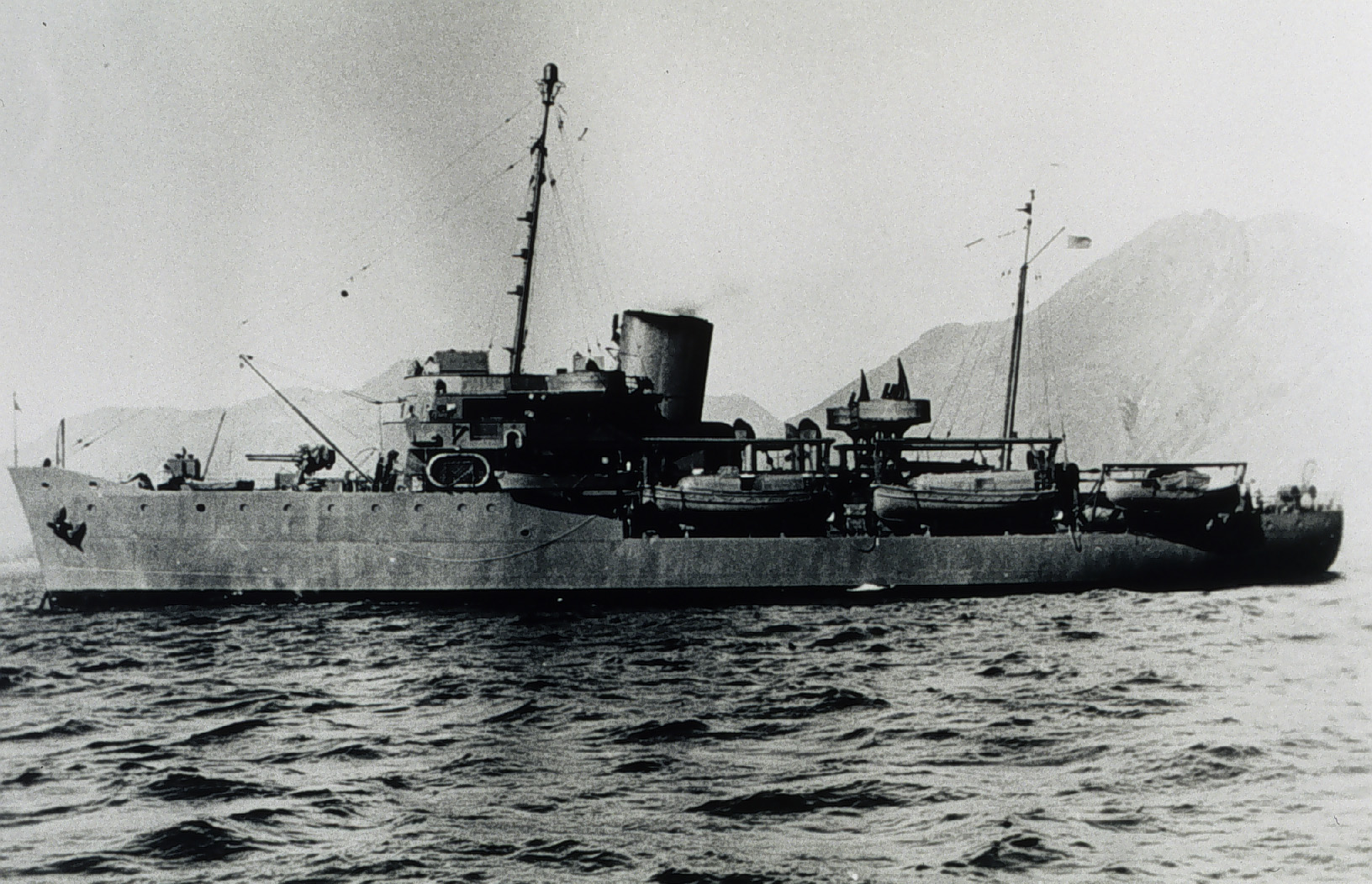
USC&GS Explorer (OSS 28) in the Aleutian Islands in 1944

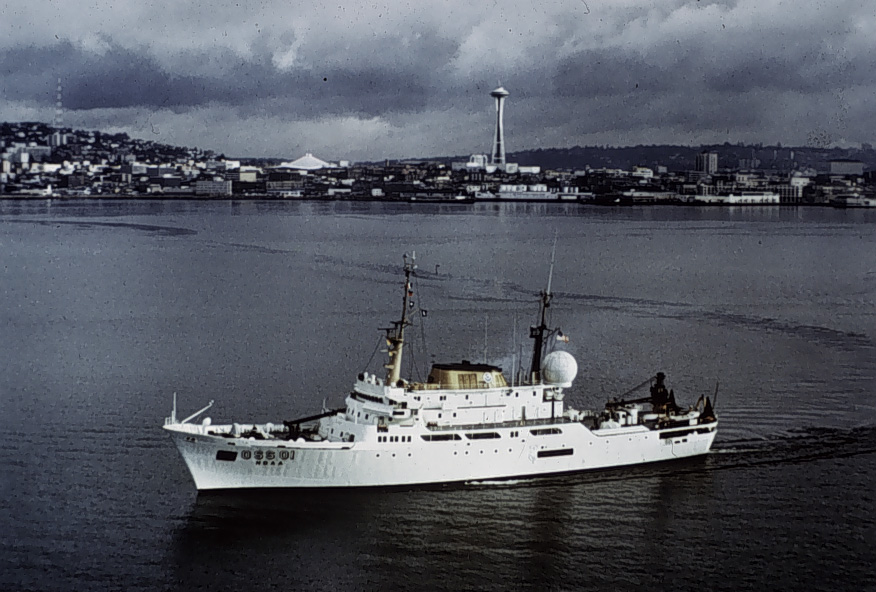
NOAAS Oceanographer (R 101) off Seattle, Washington, ca. 1974. As USC&GS Oceanographer (OSS 01), she was flagship of the Coast and Geodetic Survey fleet from her commissioning in 1966 until the creation of NOAA in 1970.

A partial list of the Coast and Geodetic Survey's ships:

- USC&GS A. D. Bache (1871) (in service c. 1871 – 1900)
- USC&GS A. D. Bache (1901) (in service 1901–1917; 1919–1927)
- USCS Active (in service 1852–1861)
- USC&GS Arago (1854) (in service 1854–1881)
- USC&GS Arago (1871) (in service 1871–1890)
- USCS Arctic (in service 1856–1858)
- USC&GS Audwin (in service 1919–1927)
- USCS Baltimore (in service 1851–1858)
- USCS Bancroft (in service 1846–1862)
- USC&GS Barataria (in service 1867–1885)
- USC&GS Baton Rouge (in service 1875–1880)
- USCS Belle (in service 1848–1857)
- USCS Benjamin Peirce (in service 1855–1868)
- USCS Bowditch (in service 1854–1874)
- USC&GS Bowie (CSS 27) (in service 1946–1967)
- USC&GS Carlile P. Patterson (in service 1884–1918)
- USC&GS Cosmos (in service 1887–1927)
- USC&GS Dailhache (in service 1919–1934)
- USC&GS Davidson (1925) (in service 1933–1935)
- USC&GS Davidson (CSS 31) (in service 1967–1970, then with NOAA 1970–1989)
- USC&GS Discoverer (1918) (in service 1922–1941)
- USC&GS Discoverer (OSS 02) (in service 1967–1970, then with NOAA 1970–1996)
- USC&GS Drift (in service 1876–1893)
- USC&GS Eagre (in service c. 1870s–1903)
- USC&GS Elsie III (in service 1919–1944)
- USC&GS Explorer (1904) (in service 1904–1918; 1919–1939)
- USC&GS Explorer (OSS 28) (in service 1940–1968)
- USC&GS Fairweather (MSS 20) (in service 1968–1970, then with NOAA 1970–1989 and 2004–present)
- USC&GS Fathomer (1871) (in service 1871–1881)
- USC&GS Fathomer (1904) (in service 1905–1942)
- USC&GS Ferrel (ASV 92) (in service 1968–1970, then with NOAA 1970–2002)
- USRC Gallatin (1830) (in service 1840–1848 and from 1849)
- USC&GS George S. Blake (in service 1874–1905; famous as pioneer ship in deep-ocean survey and oceanography)
- USC&GS Gilbert (in service 1930–1962)
- USC&GS Guide (1918) (in service 1923–1941)
- USC&GS Guide (1929) (in service 1941–1942)
- Hassler (in service 1871–1895)
- USC&GS Heck (ASV 91) (in service 1967–1970, then with NOAA 1970–1995)
- USC&GS Helianthus (in service 1919–1939)
- USC&GS Hilgard (ASV 82) (in service 1942–1967)
- USC&GS Hodgson (CSS 26) (in service 1946–1967)
- USC&GS Hydrographer (1901) (in service 1901–1917; 1919–1928)
- USC&GS Isis (in service 1915–1917; 1919–1920)
- USC&GS Lester Jones (ASV-79) (in service 1940–1967)
- USC&GS Lydonia (CS 302) (in service 1919–1947)
- USCS Madison (in service 1850–1858)
- USC&GS Marindin (in service 1919–1944)
- USC&GS Marinduque (in service 1905–1932)
- USC&GS Marmer (in service 1957–1968)
- USC&GS Matchless (in service 1885–1919)
- USC&GS McArthur (1874) (in service 1876–1915)
- USC&GS McArthur (MSS 22) (in service 1966–1970, then with NOAA 1970–2003)
- USCS Meredith (in service 1851–1872)
- USC&GS Mikawe (in service 1920–1939)
- USC&GS Mitchell (in service 1919–1944)
- USCS Morris (in service 1849–1855)
- USC&GS Mount Mitchell (MSS 22) (in service 1968–1970, then with NOAA 1970–1995)
- USC&GS Natoma (in service 1919–1935)
- USC&GS Oceanographer (OSS 26) (in service 1930–1942)
- USC&GS Oceanographer (OSS 01) (in service 1966–1970, then with NOAA 1970–1996)
- USC&GS Ogden (in service 1919–1944)
- USC&GS Onward (in service 1919–1920)
- USC&GS Pathfinder (1898) (in service 1899–1942, renamed USC&GS Researcher 1941)
- USC&GS Pathfinder (OSS 30) (in service 1946–1970, then with NOAA 1970–1971)
- USC&GS Patton (ASV-80) (in service 1941–1967)
- USC&GS Peirce (CSS 28) (in service 1963–1970, then with NOAA 1970–1992)
- USCS Phoenix (in service 1845–1857)
- USC&GS Pioneer (1918) (in service 1922–1941)
- USC&GS Pioneer (1929) (in service 1941–1942)
- USC&GS Pioneer (OSS 31) (in service 1946–1966)
- USC&GS Ranger (in service 1919–1930 or 1931)
- USC&GS Research (1901) (in service 1901–1918)
- USC&GS Researcher (OSS 03) (in service 1970, then with NOAA 1970–1996)
- USCS Robert J. Walker (in service 1848–1860)
- USC&GS Romblon (in service 1905–1921)
- USC&GS Scandinavia (acquired 1919)
- USC&GS Silliman (in service 1871–1888)
- USC&GS Surveyor (1917) (in service 1917 and 1919–1956)
- USC&GS Surveyor (OSS 32) (in service 1960–1970, then with NOAA 1970–1995 or 1996)
- USC&GS Taku (in service 1898–1917)
- USRC Taney (1833) (in service 1847–1850)
- USC&GS Thomas R. Gedney (in service 1875–1915)
- USCS Vanderbilt (in service 1842–1855)
- USCS Varina (in service 1854–1875)
- USS Vixen (in service 1860s)
- USC&GS Wainwright (ASV 83) (in service 1942–1967)
- USC&GS Westdahl (in service 1929–1946)
- USC&GS Whiting (CSS 29) (in service 1963–1970, then with NOAA 1970–2003)
- USC&GS Wildcat (1919) (in service 1919–1941)
- USC&GS Yukon (1873) (in service 1873–1894)
- USC&GS Yukon (1898) (in service 1898–1923)

== Flags and pennants ==
The United States Coast and Geodetic Survey flag, flown by commissioned ships of the Survey as a distinctive mark from 1899 to 1970.

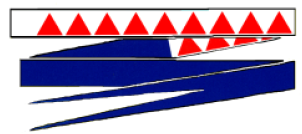
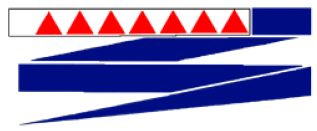
Commissioning pennants for U.S. Coast and Geodetic Survey ships. The largest ships flew a pennant with 13 triangles (left), while smaller vessels flew a pennant with seven (right).

The Coast and Geodetic Survey was authorized its own flag on January 16, 1899. The flag, which remained in use until the Survey merged with other agencies to form NOAA on October 3, 1970, was blue, with a central white circle and a red triangle within the circle. The triangle symbolized the discipline of triangulation used in surveying.

Commissioned ships of the Coast and Geodetic Survey flew the flag of the United States as their ensign. After the Survey's flag was authorized, they also flew it at the highest point on the forwardmost mast, where it served as a distinctive mark of the Survey as a separate seagoing service from the U.S. Navy, with which the Survey shared a common ensign.

Ships of the Coast and Geodetic Survey fleet also flew a "commission pennant" in a similar manner to U.S. Navy and United States Coast Guard ships. The fleet had three commission pennants, one for its largest ships and two for smaller vessels. The pennant for the largest ships was 15 feet (4.6 m) long and had 13 red triangles on a white background at the hoist, with the remainder of the pennant blue, while the pennants for smaller ships were 9 and 4 feet (2.7 and 1.2 m) long and had seven red triangles but otherwise are identical in design to the pennant for the largest ships. As in the Coast and Geodetic Survey flag, the red triangles symbolized triangulation.

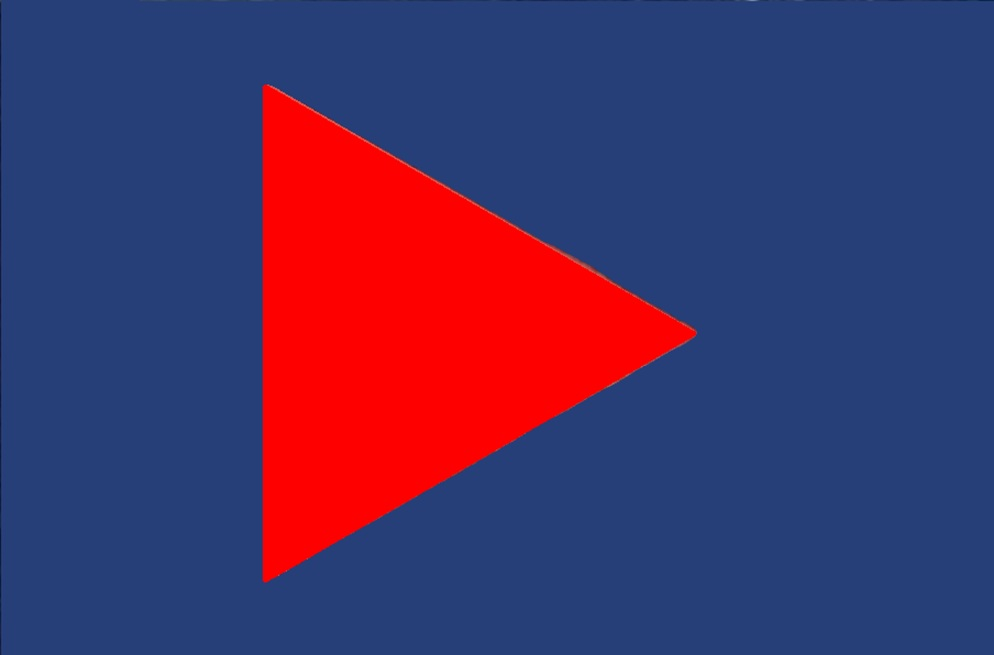
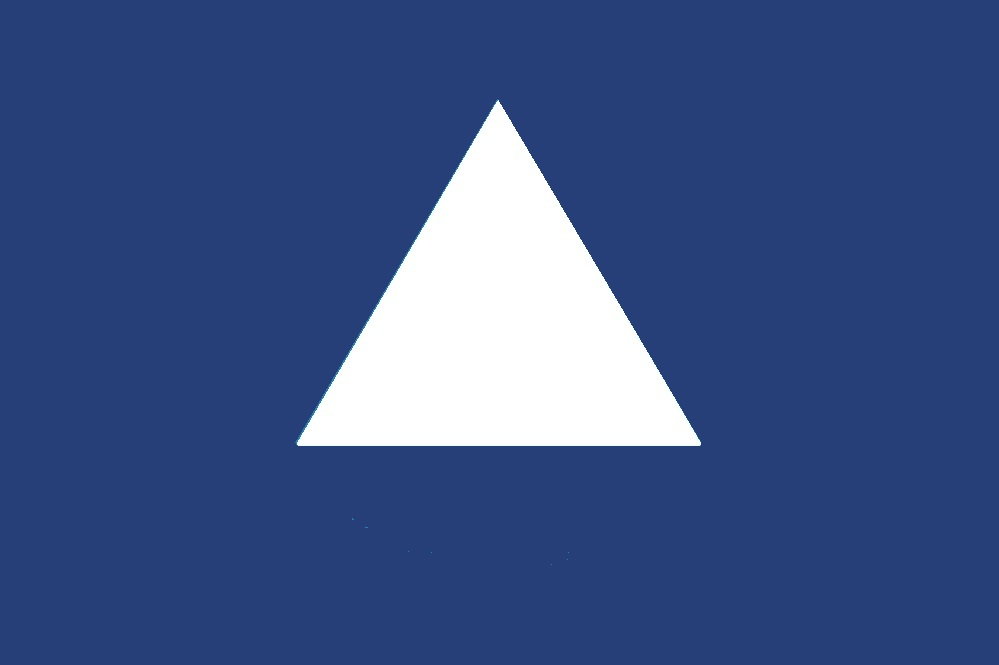
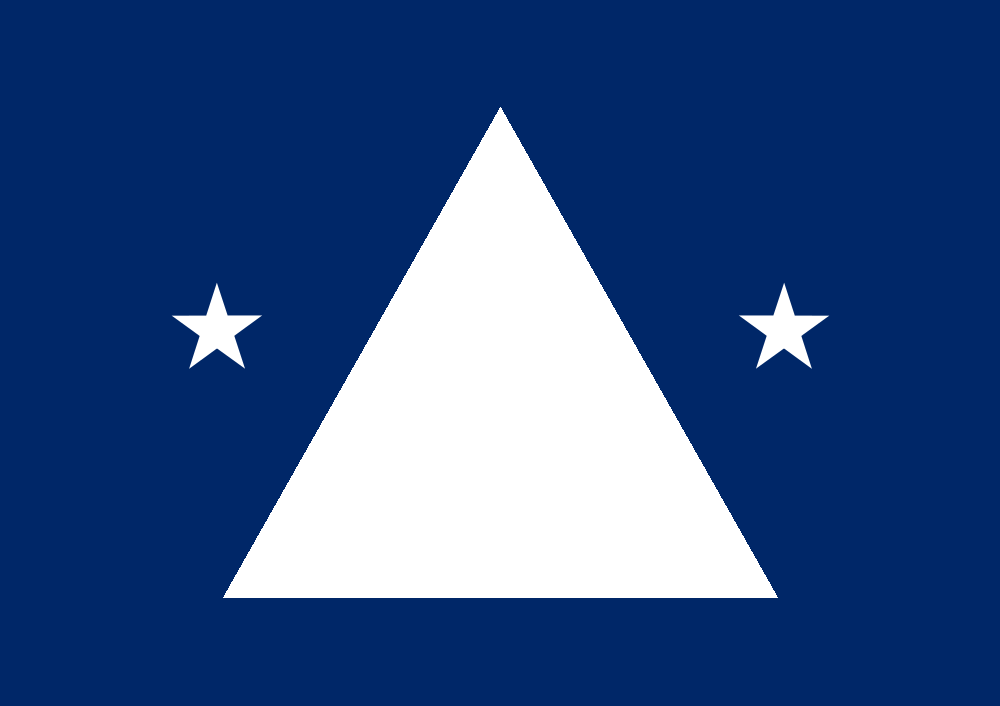
The flag of the superintendent, later director, of the U.S. Coast and Geodetic Survey changed over the years. LEFT: Superintendent's flag, 1899. CENTER: Director's flag, 1925. RIGHT: Director's flag, 1934.

When the Coast and Geodetic Survey's flag was authorized in 1899, a superintendent's flag also was authorized, which ships flew when the superintendent was aboard. By 1925, the design of what was by then the director's flag had changed. By 1934, it had changed again so that it included two stars in a manner similar to that of U.S. Navy rear admirals. The 1934 flag later became the flag of rear admirals of the NOAA Commissioned Officer Corps.

Under ESSA, the Coast and Geodetic Survey retained its distinct identity, and its ships continued to fly the Coast and Geodetic Survey flag as a distinctive mark, as well as the Coast and Geodetic Survey commission pennants, during the ESSA years. However, the ESSA flag, in use from 1965 to 1970, was adapted from the Coast and Geodetic Survey flag by adding a blue circle to the center of the Survey flag, with a stylized, diamond-shaped map of the world within the blue circle. The blue circle containing the map lay entirely within the red triangle.

The NOAA flag also was adapted from the Coast and Geodetic Survey flag by adding the NOAA emblem – a circle divided into two parts by the white silhouette of a flying seagull, with the roughly triangular portion above the bird being dark blue and the portion below it a lighter blue – to the center of the old Survey flag. The NOAA emblem lies entirely within the red triangle. In the NOAA fleet, ships fly the NOAA flag as a distinctive mark as well as commission pennants identical to those of ships of the Coast and Geodetic Survey fleet.

== See also ==
- Awards and decorations of the United States Coast and Geodetic Survey
- Height Modernization
- Hydrographic survey#United States
- Hydrography
- International maritime signal flags
- Lists of flags
- Radio acoustic ranging
- Nautical chart
- Naval Oceanographic Office
- Seconds pendulum
- Surveying
- Topography
- United States Hydrographic Office
- US Coast and Geodetic Survey Seismological and Geomagnetic House
