= USC&GS Mitchell =

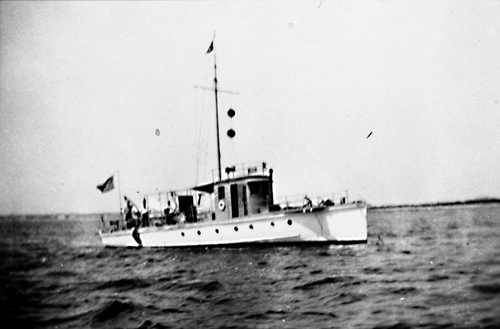
- USC&GS Mitchell conducting current surveys.

History

United States
- Name: Mitchell
- Namesake: Henry Mitchell (1830–1902), U.S. Coast Survey pioneer in the study of the physical oceanography of estuaries and harbors
- Builder: Canton Lumber Company, Baltimore, Maryland
- Cost: $12,000
- Completed: 1919
- Commissioned: 1919
- Decommissioned: 1944

General characteristics
- Type: Survey launch
- Length: 60 ft (18 m)
- Beam: 14.8 ft (4.5 m)
- Draft: 4.6 ft (1.4 m)
- Propulsion: Two gasoline engines

USC&GS Mitchell was a launch that served as a survey ship in the United States Coast and Geodetic Survey from 1919 to 1944.

Mitchell was built by the Canton Lumber Company at Baltimore, Maryland, in 1919. She entered Coast and Geodetic Survey service that year.

On 10–11 December 1924, Mitchell and the Coast and Geodetic Survey launch USC&GS Marindin aided a United States Marine Corps 50-foot (15 m) motor sailer that had gone aground by pulling it off the rocks and towing it to the U.S. Marine Corps boathouse at St. Thomas in the United States Virgin Islands.

Mitchell was retired from Coast and Geodetic Survey service in 1944.
