= USC&GS Arago (1871) =

History

United States
- Name: USC&GS Arago
- Namesake: Dominique François Jean Arago (1786-1853), a French naturalist
- Builder: Maury and Steinburg, New York, New York
- Completed: 1871
- Fate: Sold to U.S. Lighthouse Service 1890

General characteristics
- Type: Survey ship
- Length: 93 ft 5 in (28.47 m)
- Beam: 15 ft 8 in (4.78 m)
- Draft: 5 ft 9 in (1.75 m)
- Propulsion: Steam engine

USC&GS Arago was a steamer that served as a survey ship in the United States Coast Survey (renamed the United States Coast and Geodetic Survey in 1878) from 1871 to 1890. She was the second ship of the Coast Survey or Coast and Geodetic Survey to bear the name.

Arago was built by Maury and Steinburg at New York City in 1871. She did survey work along the United States East Coast throughout her career.

From 1871 until 1881, she was one of two ships in Coast Survey and Coast and Geodetic Survey named Arago, the other being USC&GS Arago of 1854.

Arago was sold to the United States Lighthouse Service in 1890.
