= NOAAS Discoverer (R 102) =

1966 American oceanographic research ship

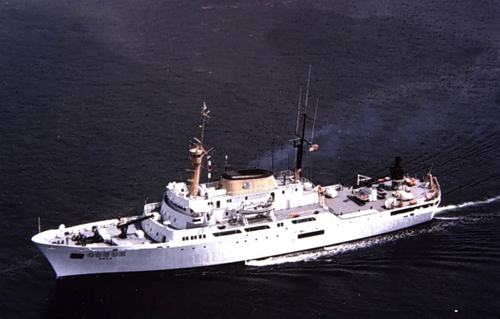
- USC&GS Discoverer (OSS 02) in Alaskan waters sometime between 1967 and 1970.

History

United States
- Name: USC&GS Discoverer (OSS 02)
- Namesake: A discoverer, a person who engages in discovery, the act of detecting and learning something
- Builder: Aerojet General Shipyards, Jacksonville, Florida
- Laid down: 10 September 1963
- Launched: 29 October 1964
- Completed: 1966
- Commissioned: 29 April 1967
- Home port: Miami, Florida
- Fate: Transferred to National Oceanic and Atmospheric Administration 3 October 1970

United States
- Name: NOAAS Discoverer (R 102)
- Namesake: Previous name retained
- Acquired: Transferred from U.S. Coast and Geodetic Survey 3 October 1970
- Decommissioned: 16 August 1996
- Home port: Miami, Florida; later Seattle, Washington
- Identification: IMO number: 6600814
- Fate: Scrapped 2010

General characteristics
- Class & type: Oceanographer-class oceanographic research ship
- Tonnage: 3,701 GRT; 1,095 NRT
- Displacement: 4,033 tons (full load)
- Length: 92.4 m (303 ft 2 in)
- Beam: 15.8 m (51 ft 10 in)
- Draft: 6.0 m (19 ft 8 in)
- Installed power: 5,000 shp (3,700 kW)
- Propulsion: Diesel-electric: Two Westinghouse 1150 diesel generator sets, two Westinghouse electric motors, two screws; 400 hp (300 kW) bow thruster; 937 tons fuel
- Speed: 15.8 knots (29.3 km/h) (sustained)
- Range: 12,250 nmi (22,690 km) at 15 knots (28 km/h)
- Endurance: 34 days
- Complement: 79 (13 NOAA Corps officers, six licensed civilian officers, 60 crewmen) plus up to 24 scientists
- Sensors & processing systems: One weather radar, two navigational radars; additional sensors installed before 1986 reactivation (see text)
- Notes: 1.2 MW electrical power

NOAAS Discoverer (R 102), originally USC&GS Discoverer (OSS 02), was an American Oceanographer-class oceanographic research vessel in service in the United States Coast and Geodetic Survey from 1966 to 1970 and in the National Oceanic and Atmospheric Administration (NOAA) from 1970 to 1996. She was the second Coast and Geodetic Survey ship and first NOAA ship to bear the name Discoverer.

== Construction ==
Discoverer was laid down on 10 September 1963 by Aerojet General Shipyards at Jacksonville, Florida. A very serious fire in the area of her meat preparation room and freezers brought her construction to a stop, but it resumed and she was launched on 29 October 1964. Soon after launching, she was moved to the Maryland Shipbuilding and Drydock Company at Baltimore, Maryland, where she received a single computer system, the first system of its kind, which revolutionizing environmental data collection and processing; via the computer, Discoverer's propulsion and other machinery was automated through a centralized engine room control (CERC) system, which measured and recorded the ship's course and speed, magnetic field intensity, gravity, surface current, and temperature. She had chemistry, wet and dry oceanographic, meteorological, gravimetric, and photographic laboratories. She also had several precision oceanographic winches and an underwater observation chamber.

After successful sea trials — in which she outperformed her sister ship NOAAS Oceanographer (R 101), making 17 knots (31 km/h) ahead, 1 knot (1.9 km/h) more than she was designed for, and 13 knots (24 km/h) astern — she was delivered to the United States Government on 15 December 1966. At 303 feet (92 m) in length, she and her sister Oceanographer — which entered service nine months before Discoverer — were the largest vessels ever constructed for research purposes at the time.

== Operational career ==
The U.S. Coast and Geodetic Survey classified the ship as an "ocean survey ship" (OSS) and commissioned her as USC&GS Discoverer (OSS 02), the second Coast and Geodetic Survey ship of the name, on 29 April 1967 with Captain William F. Deane, USC&GS, in command. For 30 years, she operated in the Atlantic and Pacific Oceans and from the Arctic to the Antarctic ice shelf. By conservative estimates, she steamed more than 1,000,000 nautical miles (1,900,000 km; 1,200,000 mi) during her career, spending between 240 and 270 days of each year at sea.

Home-ported in Miami, Florida, Discoverer's first assignment was to represent the U.S. Government at the 1967 International and Universal Exposition, or Expo 67, in Montreal, Quebec, Canada. She was on display there from 2 to 9 July 1967

Following Expo 67, Discoverer embarked on an intensive study of the Gregg Seamount in the North Atlantic Ocean. The research was the first of its kind to be conducted on a seamount. Discoverer's scientific expedition moored and recovered complex oceanographic instruments during the research. Despite encountering numerous malfunctions in the equipment, Discoverer's personnel persevered.

Later in 1967, after a minor overhaul at Jacksonville, Florida, Discoverer operated on research expeditions in the Gulf of Maine and over the Atlantic Ocean's Blake Plateau, investigating the status of manganese nodules on the ocean floor. In January 1968 she embarked on a three-month expedition of 20,000 nautical miles (37,000 km; 23,000 mi) to gather information from the depths of the South Atlantic Ocean. She delivered personnel and equipment to the west coast of Africa, then headed back across the Atlantic to Cape Hatteras, North Carolina. Under the direction of Dr. Robert S. Dietz, she conducted operations in which data was used in the investigation of geological history and theories of continental drift.

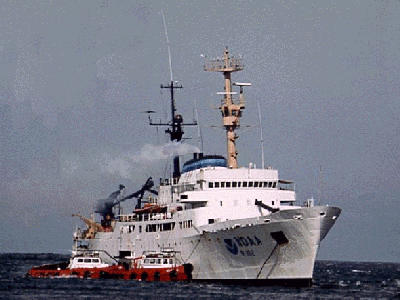
NOAAS Discoverer (R 102)

When the Coast and Geodetic Survey and other United States Government agencies combined to form NOAA on 3 October 1970, Discoverer became part of the NOAA fleet as the research ship NOAAS Discoverer (R 102), the first NOAA ship to bear the name. Her home port later was shifted to Seattle, Washington. In 1985, she received a multi-beam bathymetric mapping sonar, the Inmarsat satellite communications system, and a Global Position Indicator.

During her years of service, Discoverer's assigned projects varied from cruise to cruise, and it also was common for several different projects to be carried out aboard her simultaneously. The types of studies carried out were varied and included biological, chemical, geological and physical oceanography, meteorological, and seismic research. Discoverer's major projects included the Aerosol Characterization Experiment (ACE), the Radiatively Important Trace Species (RITS), the World Ocean Circulation Experiment (WOCE), the Combined Sensor Project (CSP), the Global Ocean-Atmosphere-Land System (GOALS) project, and NOAA's Vents project (involving the study of underwater volcanic and venting activity within 100 nautical miles (190 km) of the coast of the state of Washington along the southern Juan de Fuca Ridge the Blanco fracture zone, and a marginal subduction zone). Ancillary projects, carried out in addition to the main objectives of each cruise, included the Automated Shipboard Aerological Program (ASAP), the Cadet Training Program (for students from the California Maritime Academy, the United States Military Academy, and the United States Naval Academy), marine mammal observations (she averaged 23 sightings of marine mammals per year), use of her Shipboard Environmental Data Acquisition System (SEAS) (averaging 1,700 weather reports per year, she was among the top ten reporting ships in the program in each year from 1989 through 1996 and was the top reporter in 1992, 1993, and 1994), and the Teacher at Sea Program (in which teachers came aboard to observe operations in the Vents program).

During 1987, the United States Navy used Discoverer as a replacement for the Military Sealift Command oceanographic survey ship USNS Bowditch, installing Bowditch's narrow-beam mapping sonars, doppler sonar, and navigational equipment aboard Discoverer.

During her final field season in 1996, Discoverer provided the at-sea platform for two of the largest oceanographic experiments ever conducted—the first Aerosol Characterization Experiment and the final Pacific cruise for the World Ocean Circulation Experiment. These expeditions sought to determine the effects of atmospheric pollution on global climate, and to understand the physics of climate change on Earth. Results from these cruises were used to improve global climate, ocean circulation, and greenhouse gas models.

NOAA decommissioned Discoverer at Seattle, Washington, on 16 August 1996. She remained inactive in reserve in the NOAA Pacific Fleet at Seattle until sold for scrap. She was scrapped at Aliağa, Turkey, in 2010.

== Shark attack ==
On 23 March 1994, Discoverer was in the Pacific Ocean 300 nautical miles (556 km; 345 mi) east of Easter Island allowing several members of her crew to engage in recreational swimming when a shark attacked the swimmers. After biting Seaman Phil Buffington, inflicting wounds on his legs that would require over 50 stitches, the shark attacked Heather Boswell, a 19-year-old student aboard for a six-month stint working in Discoverer's galley. Another crew member filmed the shark pulling her under, shaking her and biting off her left leg at mid-thigh. Three members of Discoverer's crew—Matthew Ofthus, Jon Knox, and Lisa Glover—came to her rescue in a boat, with two pulling her from the shark's jaws and into the boat while the third beat the shark with a stick. The shark then moved toward a third swimmer who was still partially in the water while climbing onto Discoverer via a rope ladder, but shots fired by crewmen aboard Discoverer apparently drove it away before it could attack.

Boswell and Buffington were brought aboard Discoverer, where the ship's nurse, Judeth Layne, took charge of treating them. In Seattle, NOAA Corps commanders Lawrence Simoneaux, James Herkelrath, and Steve Stringfellow set up a command post to provide assistance to Layne aboard the ship and arranged logistical support for the evacuation of Buffington and Boswell and the arrival of emergency medical teams. A five-person United States Air Force medical team led by Darr Lafon and Larry Martindale flew on a KC-135 Stratotanker from Howard Air Force Base in Panama to Easter Island to meet the ship. They stabilized Boswell, who had lost almost half of her blood in the attack. After multiple transfusions, the team and ship's crew transported Boswell to Gorgas Army Hospital in Panama City, Panama, for initial closure of what remained of her left thigh. After stabilization overnight, with more transfusions for Boswell, both victims were transported to Seattle in a C-21 Learjet air ambulance. In 1994, for their efforts in rescuing and saving the lives of the two injured swimmers, Layne, Ofthus, Knox, and Glover received the Department of Commerce Gold Medal and Simoneaux, Herkelrath, and Stringfellow received the Department of Commerce Silver Medal.

== Commemoration ==
Discoverer Seamount, in the South Pacific Ocean at 01°51′00″S 140°00′00″W, is named for Discoverer.

== See also ==
- NOAA ships and aircraft
