= USCS Phoenix =

History

United States
- Name: Phoenix
- Commissioned: 1845
- Decommissioned: 1857

General characteristics
- Type: Survey ship (schooner)
- Length: 70 ft (21 m)
- Beam: 17 ft (5.2 m)
- Draft: 6.8 ft (2.1 m)
- Propulsion: Sails
- Sail plan: Schooner-rigged

USCS Phoenix was a schooner which served as a survey ship in the United States Coast Survey from 1845 to 1857.

After acquiring her from the United States Navy, the Coast Survey commissioned Phoenix in 1845 and operated her in its Atlantic fleet throughout her career. She was the first Coast Survey ship to arrive on the United States Gulf Coast. Her first commanding officer, Lieutenant Commanding Carlile P. Patterson (1816–1881), conducted the first surveys for the Coast Survey in the Gulf of Mexico in 1846, including tide and current surveys and hydrographic surveys of Horn Island Passage, parts of Mississippi Sound, and the bar at Mobile, Alabama. Phoenix also performed hydrographic work in 1847, but beginning in 1848 she was used only to transport and house triangulation and topographic parties, a role she performed for the remainder of her career.

A tornado struck Phoenix while she rode at anchor in Mississippi Sound on the U.S. Gulf Coast on the night of 31 March 1854, causing her to capsize and sink in 20 seconds. Her crew survived by clinging to her mastheads, which remained above water after she sank in 20 feet (6.1 meters) of water. The crew managed to free one of her boats about an hour after she sank and row to shore safely. She was raised three weeks later, repaired, and returned to service. Her captain, Coast Survey Assistant Julius E. Hilgard, took advantage of the calamity to examine and report on the condition of surveying instruments aboard Phoenix after their three-week immersion in seawater.

Phoenix spent the 1855 field season transporting and housing Coast Survey teams who triangulated an approximately 60-mile (97-kilometer) stretch of coast between Pascagoula, Mississippi, and the entrance to Lake Pontchartrain in Louisiana. In 1856, she supported survey parties along the coast of Texas, arriving there with significant storm damage after a rough passage.

Phoenix was retired from service in 1857.
