= USC&GS Westdahl =

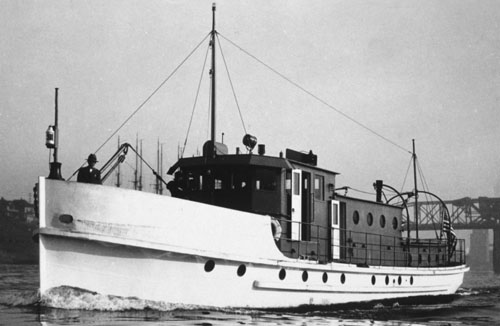
- USC&GS Westdahl on sea trials at Portland, Oregon, in 1929

History

United States
- Name: Westdahl
- Namesake: Ferdinand Westdahl (1843-1919), who served in the U.S. Coast Survey and U.S. Coast and Geodetic Survey 1867-1919
- Completed: 1929
- Commissioned: 1929
- Decommissioned: 1946
- Fate: Retired 1946

General characteristics
- Type: Survey ship
- Length: 77.5 ft (23.6 m)
- Beam: 15.5 ft (4.7 m)
- Draft: 7.5 ft (2.3 m)
- Propulsion: Diesel engine

USC&GS Westdahl was a survey ship that served in the United States Coast and Geodetic Survey from 1929 to 1946.

Westdahl was built in 1929 at Portland, Oregon, and entered Coast and Geodetic Survey service that year. She spent her career along the United States West Coast.

On 6 October 1935, Westdahl towed the disabled fishing boat Diana from Point Retreat on the northern tip of Admiralty Island in southeast Alaska to Juneau, Alaska.

Westdahl was retired from Coast and Geodetic Survey service in 1946.
