= USC&GS Marindin =

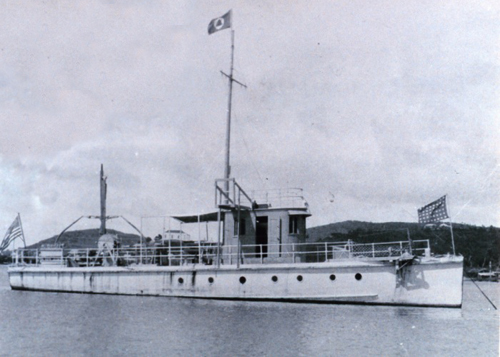
- USC&GS Marindin outfitted for wire drag hydrographic survey work.

History

United States
- Name: Marindin
- Namesake: Henri Louis François Marindin (1843–1904)
- Builder: Canton Lumber Company, Baltimore, Maryland
- Cost: $12,000 USD
- Completed: 1919
- In service: 1919
- Out of service: 1944

General characteristics
- Type: Survey Launch
- Length: 60 ft (18 m)
- Beam: 14.8 ft (4.5 m)
- Draft: 4.6 ft (1.4 m)
- Propulsion: Two gasoline engines

USC&GS Marindin was a launch that served as a survey ship in the United States Coast and Geodetic Survey from 1919 to 1944. She was the only Coast and Geodetic Survey ship to bear the name.

Marindin was built by the Canton Lumber Company at Baltimore, Maryland, in 1919. She entered Coast and Geodetic Survey service that year.

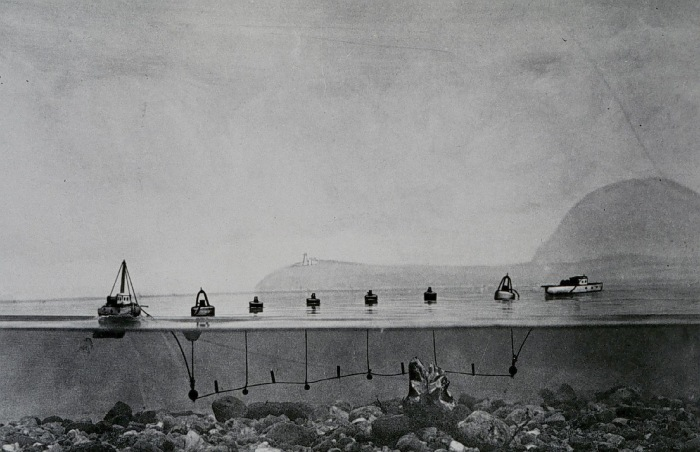
A United States Coast and Geodetic Survey diagram of ca. 1920 of wire-drag hydrographic survey operations as carried out by Marindin and Ogden. The basic principle is to drag a wire attached to two vessels; if the wire encounters an obstruction it will come taut and form a "V."

Marindin spent her career on the United States East Coast. She worked as a wire-drag hydrographic survey vessel with the Coast and Geodetic Survey launch USC&GS Ogden.

On 10–11 December 1924, Marindin and the Coast and Geodetic survey launch USC&GS Mitchell aided a United States Marine Corps 50-foot (15 m) motor sailer that had gone aground by pulling it off the rocks and towing it to the U.S. Marine Corps boathouse at St. Thomas in the United States Virgin Islands. On 28 June 1922, she joined the Coast and Geodetic Survey survey ship USC&GS Ranger in searching for survivors of the schooner Rose Standish, which had burned off Morro Point Light, Puerto Rico, although none were found. From 4 to 12 September 1935, she and the Coast and Geodetic Survey launch USC&GS Elsie III helped in relief efforts in the Florida Keys following the passage of the violent 1935 Labor Day hurricane.

Marindin was retired from Coast and Geodetic Survey service in 1944.
