= NOAAS Oceanographer (R 101) =

Former American oceanographic research vessel

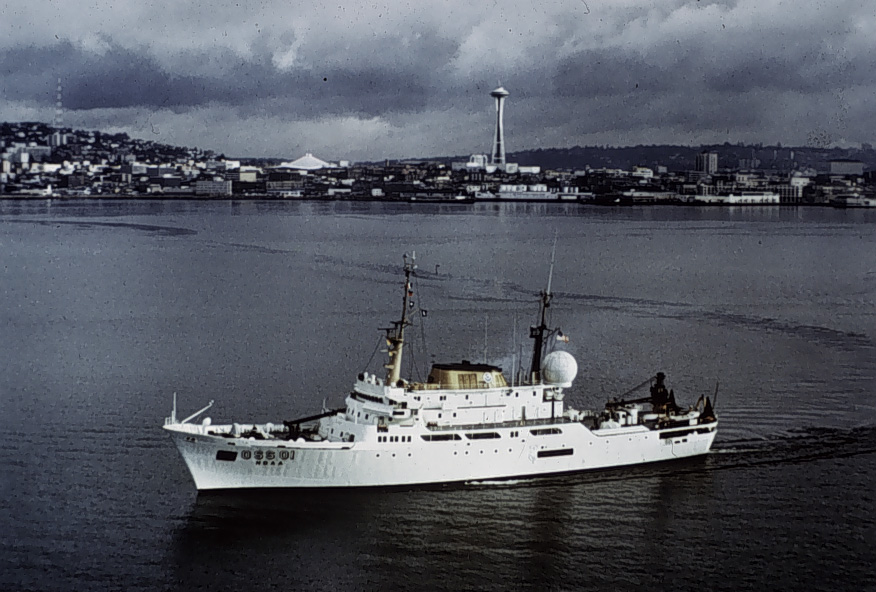
- NOAAS Oceanographer (R 101) off Seattle, Washington

History

United States
- Name: USC&GS Oceanographer (OSS 01)
- Namesake: Oceanographer, a scientist who studies the ocean
- Builder: Aerojet General Shipyards, Jacksonville, Florida
- Laid down: 22 July 1963
- Launched: 18 April 1964
- Completed: 20 April 1966
- Commissioned: 13 July 1966
- Fate: Transferred to National Oceanic and Atmospheric Administration 3 October 1970

United States
- Name: NOAAS Oceanographer (R 101)
- Namesake: Previous name retained
- Acquired: Transferred from U.S. Coast and Geodetic Survey 3 October 1970
- Decommissioned: July 1981
- Recommissioned: 8 April 1986
- Decommissioned: 1989
- Recommissioned: ?
- Decommissioned: 1996
- Home port: Seattle, Washington
- Identification: IMO number: 6600826; MMSI number: 249961000; Callsign: WTEA
- Fate: Sold 1996; Served as breakwater MV Protector 1997–2005; Sold for conversion to cruise ship Sahara 2005; Scrapped 2019

General characteristics
- Class & type: Oceanographer-class oceanographic research ship
- Tonnage: 3,701 GRT; 1,095 NRT
- Displacement: 4,033 tons (full load)
- Length: 92.4 m (303 ft 2 in)
- Beam: 15.8 m (51 ft 10 in)
- Draft: 6.0 m (19 ft 8 in)
- Installed power: 5,000 shp (3,700 kW)
- Propulsion: Diesel-electric: Two Westinghouse 1150 diesel generator sets, two Westinghouse electric motors, two screws; 400 hp (300 kW) bow thruster; 937 tons fuel
- Speed: 15.8 knots (29.3 km/h; 18.2 mph) (sustained)
- Range: 12,250 nmi (22,690 km; 14,100 mi) at 15 knots (28 km/h; 17 mph)
- Endurance: 34 days (150 days provisions)
- Complement: 79 (13 NOAA Corps officers, six licensed civilian officers, 60 crewmen) plus up to 24 scientists
- Sensors & processing systems: One weather radar, two navigational radars; additional sensors installed before 1986 reactivation (see text)
- Notes: 1.2 MW electrical power

NOAAS Oceanographer (R 101), originally USC&GS Oceanographer (OSS O1), was an American Oceanographer-class oceanographic research vessel in service in the United States Coast and Geodetic Survey from 1966 to 1970 and in the National Oceanic and Atmospheric Administration (NOAA) from 1970 to 1996. She was the second Coast and Geodetic Survey ship and first NOAA ship to bear the name Oceanographer. She served as flagship of both the Coast and Geodetic Survey and NOAA fleets.

== Construction ==
Designed by the U.S. Maritime Administration (MARAD), Oceanographer was laid down on 22 July 1963 by Gibbs Shipyards at Jacksonville, Florida, under contract to Aerojet General Shipyards and launched on 18 April 1964. Constructed under MARAD's supervision, she was completed on 20 April 1966, at 303 feet (92 meters) in length the largest vessel constructed for research purposes to date. Her stark white paint, large radome aft of the funnels, and heavy crane on the aft deck gave her a distinctive appearance. She had chemistry, wet and dry oceanographic, meteorological, gravimetric, and photographic laboratories. She also had several precision oceanographic winches.

== Operational career ==
USC&GS Oceanographer (OSS 01) was commissioned as an "ocean survey ship" (OSS) with the U.S. Coast and Geodetic Survey at the Washington Navy Yard in Washington, D.C., on 13 July 1966 under the command of Captain Arthur L. Wardwell, USESSA. With her home port at Seattle, Washington, she was the second Coast and Geodetic Survey ship of the name, and served as flagship of the Survey's fleet. When the Coast and Geodetic Survey and other United States Government agencies combined to form NOAA on 3 October 1970, she became the research ship NOAAS Oceanographer (R 101), the first NOAA ship to bear the name, as well as flagship of the NOAA fleet.

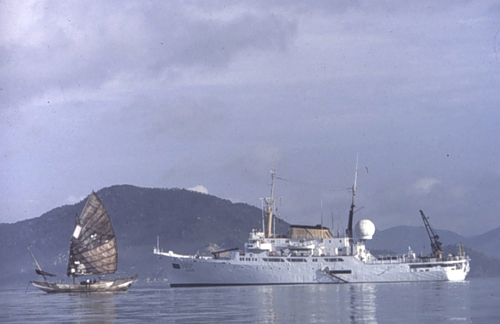
NOAAS Oceanographer during her historic visit to the People's Republic of China in 1980.

During her 30 years of service, Oceanographer sailed over 2,000,000 nautical miles (3,700,000 km) in every major ocean. In 1967 she departed Jacksonville on 31 March on a "world science and ambassadorial cruise" which took her from the United States East Coast to the United States West Coast via the North Atlantic Ocean, Mediterranean Sea, Red Sea, Indian Ocean, and Pacific Ocean, making many good-will stops along the way before concluding the voyage by arriving at Seattle on 11 December. In 1968, she supported Project Sea Use, a multi-party expedition to Cobb Seamount in the North Pacific Ocean which developed much of the initial scientific understanding of the seamount. In 1969 she completed the circumnavigation of the globe she began in March 1967 when she returned to the U.S. East Coast.

Other highlights of Oceanographer's career included participation in the first large-scale, coordinated international sea-air interaction survey, known as the BOMEX Study, in 1969, and environmental base-line studies on deep-ocean mining (DOMES). In 1980, Oceanographer became the first U.S. Government vessel allowed into a port of the People's Republic of China.

Oceanographer was placed in reserve in July 1981. She underwent a major refit in which she received an Alden weatherfax, a Sperry Mark 37 gyro, a Raytheon X-band Pathfinder radar, Inmarsat, an MX1102 Global Positioning System, a new salinometer, a Shipboard Environmental Acquisition System with expendable bathythermograph gear, a new meteorological station, and a Doppler current profiling system, and returned to service with this new equipment on 8 April 1986. Placed in reserve in 1989, she later returned to service again.

== Final disposition ==
Oceanographer and NOAA Ships Discoverer and Malcolm Baldridge, ex-Researcher, were replaced by Ronald H. Brown under the NOAA Fleet Modernization Program in the 1990s. After her decommissioning in 1996, Oceanographer was sold to the Kirkland Yacht Club Marina of Kirkland, Washington, to act as a breakwater and was renamed MV Protector. Protector was tied up at the marina from 1997 to 2005.

After G Shipping Ltd., a Malta-based company controlled by Italian race-car driver and hotelier Emanuele Garosci, purchased Protector for US$6.5 million, Protector was renamed MV Sahara in August 2005 and towed to a Seattle, Washington, shipyard to be refitted at a projected cost of US$10 million as a luxury floating hotel which could travel from port to port. A poor economy resulted in the postponement of the major renovation phase of the project, but a small work crew began tearing out small cabins that had housed embarked scientists during the ship's time with NOAA to clear the way for the eventual construction of restaurants and luxury hotel rooms. On 21 October 2010, a member of the crew, 33-year-old Lia Hawkins, disappeared while working aboard Sahara while going to dump scrap metal into a recycling container. Her body was found in the water near the container the following day, and an autopsy determined that she had drowned. After a lawsuit was filed alleging that G Shipping had done nothing to ensure the safety of workers aboard Sahara, resulting in Hawkins falling overboard to her death, courts awarded $3.45 million to Hawkins's estate on 24 April 2013. G Shipping apparently had the ship claimed by the courts in lieu of payment.

By 2016, the conversion project had been canceled and Sahara was for sale for US$1,200,000. She was scrapped in Mexico in 2019.

== See also ==
- NOAA ships and aircraft
