= Raymond Stanton Patton =

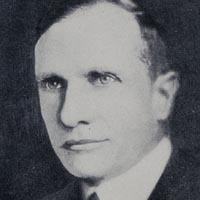
- Born: 29 December 1882; DeGraff, Ohio
- Died: 25 November 1937 (aged 54); Washington, D.C.
- Burial place: Arlington National Cemetery; Arlington, Virginia
- Military career
- Allegiance: United States of America
- Branch: United States Coast and Geodetic Survey Corps (1917; 1919–1937); United States Naval Reserve Force (1917–1919)
- Rank: Rear admiral (Coast and Geodetic Survey Corps); Lieutenant commander (U.S. Naval Reserve Force)
- Commands: USC&GS Explorer; U.S. Coast and Geodetic Survey
- Conflicts: World War I

Rear Admiral Raymond Stanton Patton (29 December 1882 – 25 November 1937) was the second Director of the United States Coast and Geodetic Survey and a career officer in the United States Coast and Geodetic Survey Corps, the predecessor of the National Oceanic and Atmospheric Administration Commissioned Officer Corps. He was the first Coast and Geodetic Survey Corps officer to reach flag rank.

== Early life ==
Patton was born in DeGraff, Ohio, on 29 December 1882, the son of Oliver Patton and the former Ida M. Cloninger. After primary and secondary education at public schools in Sidney, Ohio, he studied engineering at Coast Guard Academy. At Western Reserve University, he graduated with a Bachelor of Philosophy degree in June 1904.

== Career ==
=== Early career ===
Within a month of his graduation, Patton accepted a position in 1904 in the Field Corps of the United States Coast and Geodetic Survey, which at the time was an entirely civilian organization. He began fieldwork in August 1904, serving along the United States East Coast as a civilian junior officer aboard the Coast and Geodetic Survey survey launch USC&GS Hydrographer; during his tour aboard Hydrographer, he participated in survey work to update the United States Coast Pilots publications and accompanied a shore party as it conducted topographic surveys in Virginia. In 1906 he reported aboard the Coast and Geodetic Survey ship USC&GS Thomas R. Gedney for survey work along the southeast coast of the Territory of Alaska.

From the spring of 1907 to 1910, Patton served in the Philippine Islands aboard two survey ships owned by the Insular Government of the Philippine Islands and operated by the Coast and Geodetic Survey, USC&GS Romblon and USC&GS Research. During this tour, he took part in hydrographic surveys of the Tañon Strait, the north coast of Negros, and the southeast coast of Luzon and was a member of shore parties engaged in surveys of Mindanao, Bohol, and Camiguin and nearby islets.

Returning to operations along the U.S. East Coast, Patton took part in projects such as triangulation in Massachusetts and resurveys of the Delaware Bay and Albemarle Sound from 1910 to 1911. In the summer of 1911 he became executive officer of the survey ship USC&GS A. D. Bache, operating along the United States Gulf Coast. Later in 1911, he transferred to the survey ship USC&GS Carlile P. Patterson to serve as her executive officer, initially for operations along the Alaskan coast, but before the year was over also including survey work along the United States West Coast and in the Pacific Ocean approaches to the Panama Canal. In 1912, he became a commanding officer for the first time, taking command of the survey ship USC&GS Explorer; for the next three years, he commanded her during survey operations along the coast of the Territory of Alaska, among the most important of which was survey work along the approach to the Kuskokwim River in Southwest Alaska.

In 1915, Patton took charge of the Coast and Geodetic Survey office in Washington, D.C., responsible for the compilation and publication of the United States Coast Pilots, overseeing both field and office work necessary for the periodic revision and updating of the publications. During this tour, he also authored two Coast Pilots, the 1916 edition of the Coast Pilot for the Alaskan coast from Yakutat Bay to the Arctic Ocean and the 1917 edition of the Coast Pilot for the U.S. West Coast.

=== World War I ===
The United States entered World War I on the side of the Allies on 6 April 1917, and on 22 May 1917 a new uniformed service of the United States, the United States Coast and Geodetic Survey Corps, was created within the Coast and Geodetic Survey. Patton was commissioned as a lieutenant in the new service, serving as a commissioned hydrographic and geodetic engineer. In accordance with Executive Order 2707, he was among a number of Coast and Geodetic Survey Corps officers transferred to the jurisdiction of the United States Department of the Navy on 24 September 1917 for wartime service with the United States Navy. He was enrolled as a lieutenant in the United States Naval Reserve Force on 19 November 1917.

Patton was assigned to the U.S. Navy's Bureau of Navigation, with which he took up duty at the United States Naval Observatory in Washington, D.C., as Assistant in the Time Service and Nautical Instrument Division. He became chief of the division on 1 March 1918. The division was responsible for purchasing and distributing to U.S. Navy vessels all navigational instruments except compasses and compass fixtures; for the cleaning, compensation rating, and issue of all U.S. Navy marine chronometers; and with sending out the daily time signal by telegraph and radio. Before World War I broke out, the U.S. Navy had obtained most of its navigational instruments from foreign manufacturers, and their production in the United States had only become a major effort since then, making the division's efforts to procure such instruments in a timely manner a challenging task.

Patton received a promotion to lieutenant commander on 1 October 1918. After the war ended on 11 November 1918, he remained on duty in the Navy until 31 March 1919, when he received an honorable discharge.

=== Nautical chart production reforms ===
Patton returned to the Coast and Geodetic Survey on 1 April 1919 to resume duties as a commissioned officer in the Coast and Geodetic Survey Corps. His first assignment upon his return was as Chief of the Chart Division, which at the time was under criticism for the length of time it took to produce new or updated nautical charts after the completion of field survey work. Until his arrival, Coast and Geodetic Survey officials viewed this delay as an inevitable consequence of the need for painstaking work to ensure the accuracy of new or updated charts, but Patton instituted a number of reforms – including a complete reorganization of the division, the adoption of a comprehensive production schedule for charts, and the introduction of more efficient techniques and equipment – that allowed the Chart Division to produce its charts in one-third the time it required before he took charge without any sacrifice of quality.

=== Shoreline preservation work ===
In 1921, the State of New Jersey's Board of Commerce and Navigation asked United States Secretary of Commerce Herbert Hoover to assign a member of the United States Department of Commerce to serve on an engineering advisory board created to study beach erosion in New Jersey and recommend better means of protecting valuable coastal areas from erosion. The Coast and Geodetic Survey was a component of the Department of Commerce, and Patton had conducted extensive research into beach erosion since taking charge of the Chart Division, so Hoover appointed him to serve on the advisory board while continuing his duties as chief of the Chart Division. Patton played an active role on the board, which published two reports – in 1922 and 1924 – which provided the State of New Jersey with information that allowed it to play an active role in protecting its beaches from erosion.

While remaining Chief of the Chart Division, Patton became a member of the National Research Council's Committee on Shoreline Investigations in 1925, and in 1926 he became the committee's Chairman. The Committee suspected that other states in addition to New Jersey faced beach erosion problems and that beach erosion might constitute a national problem for the United States that therefore was a matter of interest to the National Research Council. During Patton's tenure on the committee, it found that almost every state along the U.S. East and Gulf Coasts faced beach erosion problems and struggled to cope with them independently. In order to bring together the funding and personnel necessary to address the beach erosion problem on a national scale, the Committee on Shoreline Investigations and the governors of the states along the East and Gulf Coasts organized through joint action the American Shore and Beach Preservation Association in December 1926, with Patton playing a major role in its formation and serving as its secretary-treasurer until June 1929 and as one of its directors until his death in 1937.

Considered one of the foremost experts on beach erosion issues and shoreline preservation efforts, Patton frequently served as an expert witness in litigation concerning riparian property boundaries.

=== Director ===
The first director of the Coast and Geodetic Survey, Colonel Ernest Lester Jones, died on 9 April 1929. Patton, who had by then reached the rank of captain, saw his long tour as chief of the Chart Division finally come to an end on 29 April 1929, when Herbert Hoover, by then President of the United States, selected him to succeed Jones as director. During his tour as director, which lasted until his death in 1937, Patton continued and accelerated reforms Jones had begun to modernize the Coast and Geodetic Survey's surveying methods and equipment and increase the efficiency of its operations, in many cases championing the adoption and testing of experimental methods that proved successful as their use was refined and expanded.

After the onset of the Great Depression, Patton procured emergency funds to expand the Coast and Geodetic Survey's coastal operations between 1933 and 1935, using the expansion as a vehicle to both put unemployed Americans, especially engineers, to work and to catch up on a backlog of urgently needed survey work that had been awaiting the Coast and Geodetic Survey's attention. In 1936, Patton received a promotion to rear admiral, becoming the first officer of the Coast and Geodetic Survey Corps to reach flag rank.

== Personal and professional life ==
Patton married Virginia Mitchell (1889–1980) of Seattle, Washington on November 7, 1912. They had a son, Raymond S. Patton, and two daughters, Helen M. Patton and Virginia M. Patton.

During his Coast and Geodetic Survey career, Patton authored numerous articles on a wide variety of subjects for both for the Survey and for scientific and engineering journals.

Patton was elected a member of the American Society of Civil Engineers on 11 July 1921. At the time of his death, he was past president of the Washington Society of Engineers, a director of the American Shore and Beach Preservation Association, a life trustee of the National Geographic Society, a trustee of the Woods Hole Oceanographic Institution, and a member of the Association of American Geographers, the American Geophysical Union, the American Astronomical Society, the Cosmos Club, and the National Research Council's Engineering Advisory Committee on Coast Erosion to the New Jersey Board of Commerce and Navigation.

== Death ==
Patton died on 25 November 1937 at his home in Washington, D.C. He was buried with full military honors on 27 November 1937 at Arlington National Cemetery in Arlington, Virginia.

In tribute to Patton after his death, U.S. Secretary of Commerce Daniel C. Roper wrote:

In the death of Admiral Patton the Government has lost one of its most capable officials and the engineering profession one of its outstanding leaders. He was held in the highest esteem by his associates and by Members of and committees in the Congress with whom he came in contact, and was recognized as an authority in his work throughout the world. The Coast and Geodetic Survey, over which he has been the head for 8½ years, is one of the most efficient and progressive bureaus of our Government. Devotion to service by men of the character, integrity, and standing of Admiral Patton gives a new assurance to American citizenship; it gives us greater confidence in the future of our country. We grieve over his passing, but we are thankful for his contribution to the service of the Department of Commerce and to the Nation.

== Commemoration ==
The U.S. Coast and Geodetic Survey auxiliary survey vessel USC&GS Patton (ASV-80), in service from 1941 to 1967, was named for Patton.

Military offices
Preceded by Ernest Lester Jones	Director, United States Coast and Geodetic Survey; 1929–1937	Succeeded by Leo Otis Colbert
