= USC&GSS Research =

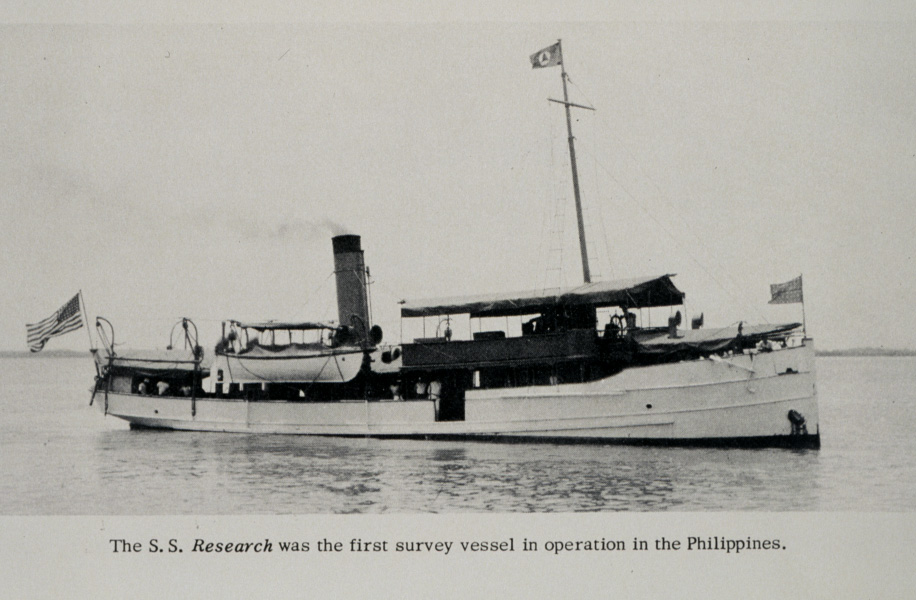
- Coast and Geodetic Survey Ship Research (1901-1918) Manila, Philippines 1901.

History

United States
- Name: Research
- Owner: Philippine Insular Government
- Operator: U.S. Coast and Geodetic Survey/Philippine Insular Government
- Completed: 1898, Hong Kong
- Acquired: Philippine Commission: 1901
- In service: USC&GS: 1 October 1901
- Out of service: USC&GS: 1918
- Identification: Signal: GVWL
- Fate: Unknown

General characteristics
- Tonnage: 95 GRT
- Length: 94.6 ft (28.8 m) Registered
- Beam: 15 ft (4.6 m)
- Draft: 8.2 ft (2.5 m)
- Speed: 9 kn (10 mph; 17 km/h)
- Complement: 4 officers, 23 men
- Notes: Ship was transferred to the Philippine Insular Government for other use. Disappears from C&GS records.

USC&GSS Research was a survey vessel owned by the Philippine Insular Government to be the first vessel operated by the United States Coast and Geodetic Survey in the Philippines from 1901 until 1918.

== Acquisition ==
Under and appropriation made March 8, 1901 by the United States Philippine Commission a small steamer (Note: No previous name, operator or specifications are mentioned in the sources.) was acquired and provided with up to $5,000 in funding for repair, refit and funds for coaling for the use of the Coast and Geodetic Survey. The steamer Research was acquired by the Government of the Philippine Islands and undergoing alterations at the end of fiscal year June 30, 1901 to be the first C&GS vessel operating in the Philippines. Research was placed in commission 1 October 1901 and first engaged in surveys on the coast of Luzon and harbors on Mindoro and Culion islands.

For operations in the Philippines the U.S. Government paid salaries, cost of travel to and from the Philippines and expenses for the U.S. Coast and Geodetic Survey officers aboard the ships. The Insular Government paid crew salaries and expenses as well as having ownership of the vessels excepting the Pathfinder. All crews were Filipino.

Research was a wooden vessel built in 1898 at Hong Kong of 95 GRT with registered length of 94.6 ft (28.8 m), registered breadth of 15 ft (4.6 m) and draft of 8.2 ft (2.5 m) with a speed of 9 kn (10 mph; 17 km/h). The vessel's signal was GVWL and complement was 4 officers and 23 men.

== Service history ==
Research, placed in commission October 1, 1901, under the command of Assistant (Note: A C&GS title of fairly high rank. The captains or masters of the ships were designated "Assistants" by the Survey in the period covered.) H. W. Rhodes of the Coast and Geodetic Survey, and Filipino crew began survey operations October 10, 1901 in Manila Bay through November 3 when the vessel required repairs. Work continued mainly on harbor surveys with a reconnaissance in Paluan Bay, Mindoro. This work was seriously hampered by the vessel's limited fresh water capacity and the need for frequent and time-consuming replenishment.

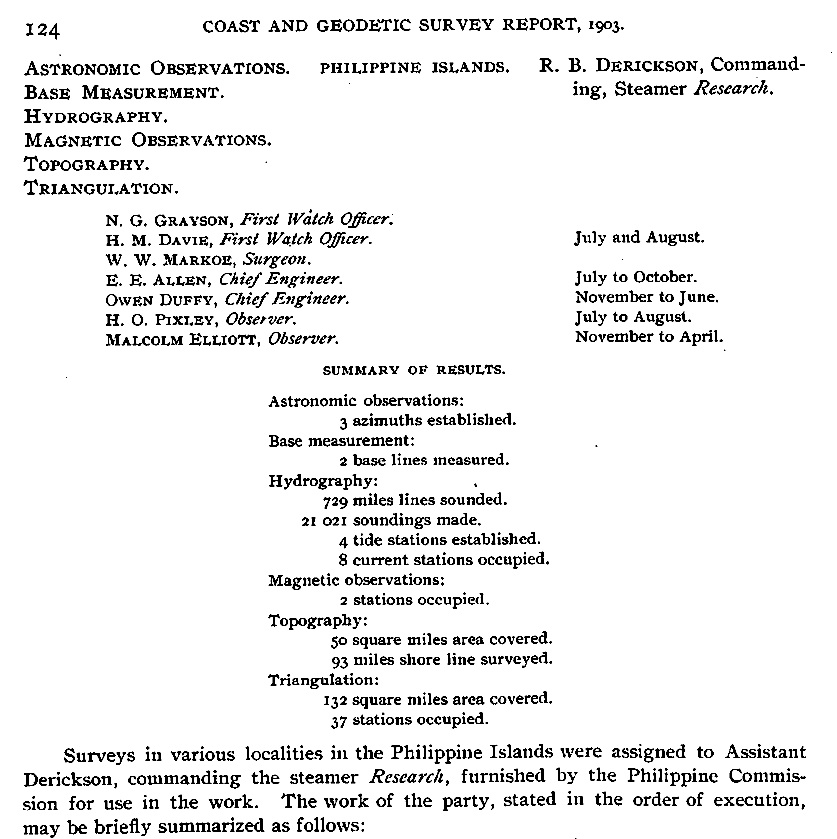
Introduction to Assistant R. B. Derickson, commanding ship Research, on page 124 of Report Of The Superintendent Of The Coast And Geodetic Survey Showing The Progress Of The Work From July 1, 1902 To June 30, 1903. The introduction illustrates the general nature of work done, ships officers and use of the term "Assistant" for ship's commanding officer.

Reports of Assistant R. B. Derickson, commanding Research during the fiscal year 1903 reporting period indicate the nature of the work undertaken. Triangulation and navigation bases were established along with tide gauges and then topographic and hydrographic surveys were begun. Inshore hydrography was done by "the whaleboat and alco-vapor launch" while offshore survey to 20 fathoms was done by casting the lead and in deeper water by the sounding machine.

In 1910 the Research was one of five C&GS vessels surveying in the Philippines, the others being Pathfinder, Romblon, Marinduque and Fathomer all except Pathfinder being owned and largely funded, excepting pay of the USC&GS officers, by the Philippine Government. The ship engaged in hydrographic surveys, including work in the Tanon Strait but spent much of its time supporting shore parties engaged in triangulation and topographic surveys of the south coast of Masbate Island, the north coast of Leyte, the west coast of Samar.

During 1913–1915 Research worked in San Bernardino Strait, the northern part of the Samar Sea and in southern Luzon, Ticao Island and Masbate Island with triangulation, hydrographic and topographic surveys. The ship underwent repairs and outfitting in Manila December 24, 1912 through late February 1913 and again between January 1, 1915 and March 16, 1915 after which proceeded to work in and around Sorsogon Bay, southern Luzon. Triangulation work to link Luzon and Ticao and Masbate Islands completed, the ship's parties began topographic and then hydrographic surveys undertaken by ship's launches and the ship.

In 1918, due to both funding issues and loss of C&GS officers to Army and Navy or sent back to the United States, the Marinduque and Research were recalled and laid up. The Research was transferred to the insular government for other use. The ship had been engaged in surveys of Manila Bay and adjacent topography. The last work of the ship's surveyors was a small area "behind the North Breakwater, Manila Bay" using launches "presumably" for estimating costs of dredging the area.

== Fate ==
After transfer the fate of the ship is not mentioned in C&GS reports. A "steam launch Research," administered by the Province of Sulu, replaced a commercial vessel Antipolo that had ceased operation in March 1918 operating out of Zamboanga serving regional ports and islands including Sulu.

The name was inherited by the second ship surveying for the Survey in the Philippines, the Pathfinder, in 1941 even as that historic ship gave its name to a second Pathfinder.
