= Robert Francis Anthony Studds =

NOAA admiral

- Studds as a junior officer sometime between 1926 and 1929.
- Born: December 17, 1896; Washington, D.C.
- Died: May 28, 1962 (aged 65)
- Burial place: Arlington National Cemetery; Arlington, Virginia
- Military career
- Allegiance: United States
- Branch: United States Army (1917–1919); United States Coast and Geodetic Survey Corps (1919–1955)
- Rank: Rear Admiral
- Commands: USC&GS Elsie III (officer-in-charge); USC&GS Fathomer; USC&GS Pathfinder (OSS 30); U.S. Coast and Geodetic Survey
- Conflicts: World War I World War II; Cold War
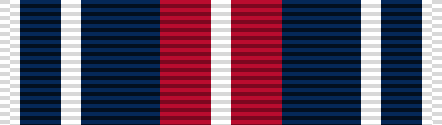
- Awards: Department of Commerce Gold Medal (1953)

Studds as officer-in-charge of USC&GS Elsie III on the Cooper River in South Carolina sometime between 1926 and 1929.

Rear Admiral Robert Francis Anthony Studds (December 17, 1896 – May 28, 1962) was a career officer in the United States Coast and Geodetic Survey Corps, predecessor of the National Oceanic and Atmospheric Administration Commissioned Officer Corps. He served as the fourth Director of the United States Coast and Geodetic Survey.

== Early life ==
Studds was born in Washington, D.C., on a farm near the Soldier's Home on December 17, 1896. After primary and secondary education at parochial and public schools in Washington, he attended the Catholic University of America, from which he graduated with a Bachelor of Science degree in civil engineering in 1917. He accepted a position with the Sanitary Division of the District of Columbia government. However, the United States had entered World War I on the side of the Allies in April 1917, and Studds soon joined the United States Army. Assigned to the United States Army Corps of Engineers, he served in the 472nd Engineer Regiment at Camp A. A. Humphreys in Virginia through the end of the war in November 1918 and until May 1919, when he returned to civilian life and to his job with the District of Columbia government.

== Career ==
=== Early career ===
Later in 1919, Studds began his career with the United States Coast and Geodetic Survey, accepting a commission as an officer in the United States Coast and Geodetic Survey Corps. His first assignment was as a deck officer and junior engineering officer aboard the Coast and Geodetic Survey survey ship USC&GS Natoma. From 1922 to 1923 he served aboard the coastal survey ship USC&GS Lydonia (CS 302), conducting hydrographic survey work along the coasts of Oregon and Florida. He served in the Philippine Islands from 1923 to 1926 aboard the survey ship USC&GS Pathfinder.

Returning to the United States, Studds was officer-in-charge of the survey launch USC&GS Elsie III from 1926 to 1929; during his tour aboard her, Elsie III conducted hydrographic surveys in New York Harbor and along the coast of South Carolina. He served a brief tour aboard the survey ship USC&GS Ranger along the coast of Puerto Rico in 1927.

=== August 15, 1936 typhoon ===
By 1936, Studds was back in the Philippines as commanding officer of the survey ship USC&GS Fathomer. With only a few days left to conclude the 1936 season's work on northeast Luzon, Studds was forced on August 9, 1936, to suspend hydrographic survey operations and order Fathomer to seek shelter in Port San Vicente as a typhoon approached the area; it passed about 50 nautical miles (93 km) from Fathomerʼs position on August 11. On August 12 Fathomer attempted to return to the survey working grounds, but confused seas and a heavy swell compelled him to order her to return to Port San Vicente. He planned for her to depart again on August 13, but was forced to cancel these plans when another typhoon approached. By August 14 it was apparent from the typhoon's track that it would strike Port San Vicente. That afternoon, Studds ordered Fathomerʼs crew to prepare to ride out the storm, securing her gear and anchoring her in the inner harbor.

Rain squalls associated with the typhoon arrived at Port San Vicente at about 0600 hours on August 15, 1936, and Fathomer began sending frequent weather reports to Manila. The weather deteriorated throughout the day, and winds reached 90 miles per hour (140 kilometres per hour) by 1730 hours; by 1905 hours winds were estimated to have reached 120 to 150 miles (193 to 242 kilometers) per hour and were creating waves six feet (1.8 meters) high even in the virtually landlocked inner harbor, so Studds ordered Fathomer to begin to operate her engines first at half-speed ahead and then at full speed ahead to try to keep from drifting. However, one of her anchor cables parted, and the wind and seas forced her aground on a reef at about 1925 hours, after which the wind forced her to list heavily to starboard.

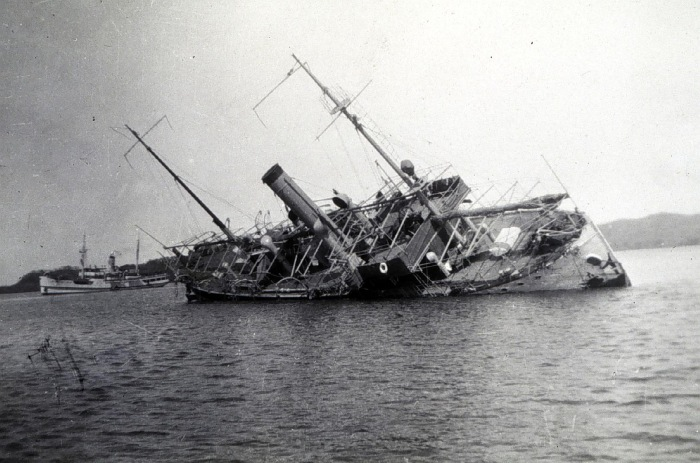
Fathomer aground in the inner harbor at Port San Vicente, Luzon, in the Philippine Islands, after the typhoon of August 15, 1936. The size of the waves in the inner harbor can be estimated by the height of Fathomer's port side above the water; at the height of the typhoon, waves broke over her crewmen as they sheltered there.

The typhoon's eye passed over Fathomer from 2015 to 2035 hours, allowing her crew to make some repairs and send a distress signal to Manila, but the extremely high winds had returned by 2040 hours. The wind forced the ship's bow around to the southwest. She listed to starboard so far that her boat deck rail was underwater. The galley range and rice boiler broke loose and tore off a ventilator to the forecastle, causing the forecastle to flood, and the engine room and boiler room also became flooded when the engine room house's starboard side became submerged. The ship's generator failed at 2100 hours, leaving her in darkness, and the radio house had to be abandoned when it threatened to tear loose from the ship. The crew took shelter along the port alleyway, well above the water's surface, but waves increased in height significantly and broke over the men despite their height above the water.

The wind and waves began to moderate at about 2200 hours, and by 2230 Fathomer's crew – all of whom survived the ordeal – could begin to work on deck again. After daybreak on August 16, 1936, repairs began in earnest, and Studds ordered some crew members to go ashore to establish a camp and render assistance to local Filipinos. At 1300 hours, the radio was repaired and Fathomer sent an SOS; the British steamer SS City of Florence immediately answered and relayed messages between Fathomer and Manila until City of Florence had moved out of range. In response to the messages, the United States Lighthouse Service lighthouse tender USLHT Canlaon departed Manila on August 18 to assist Fathomer, stopping at Aparri on August 20 to take the derrick dredge Aparri under tow.

Canlaon and Aparri reached Port San Vicente at 1400 hours on August 20, and salvage operations began immediately. Fathomer was made watertight, the reef was dynamited, and Aparri dredged loose material to free Fathomer. At 0215 hours on August 29, Fathomer was off the reef and afloat. Fathomer's crewmen ashore struck camp at daybreak on August 29; Canlaon left Port San Vicente at 1250 hours on August 30 with Fathomer in tow, and the ships arrived at Manila at 1500 hours on September 1, 1936.

Examination of data later suggested that Fathomer's barometric pressure reading at the height of the typhoon, 26.77 inches (680 millimeters) of mercury, was probably the lowest pressure ever recorded in the Philippine Islands up to that time.

Studds wrote a vivid account of Fathomer's experience in the typhoon that appeared as an article in the December 1936 edition of the Coast and Geodetic Survey Field Engineers Bulletin. He gave credit to the officers and men of Fathomer for the ship's survival and the successful salvaging of the ship, but Coast and Geodetic Survey officials credited his oversight of the crew in maintaining the ship and her equipment for her survival of the powerful typhoon.

=== Later career ===
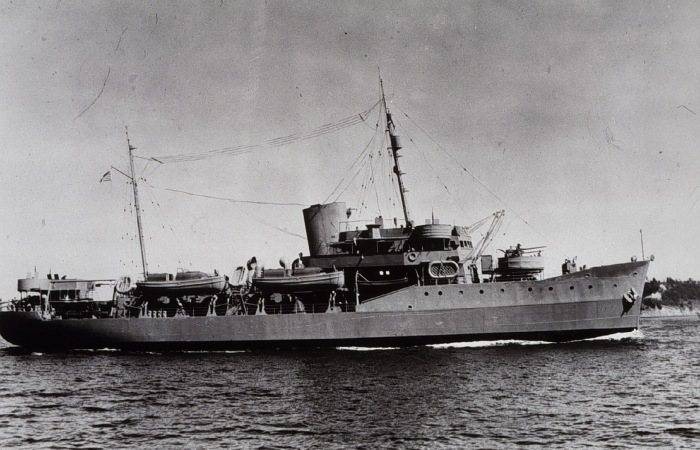
Studds commanded USC&GS Pathfinder (OSS 30) in the Aleutian Islands in the years following World War II.

Returning to the United States, Studds had various duties in the Washington, D.C., office of the Coast and Geodetic Survey, and in 1938 he became assistant chief of the Charts Division. By late 1943 he was still in this position and had reached the rank of commander.

After the conclusion of World War II in 1945, Studds took command of the ocean survey ship USC&GS Pathfinder (OSS 30), namesake of the earlier USC&GS Pathfinder he had served aboard in the 1920s. Conducting hydrographic surveys under his command in the waters off the Aleutian Islands, the newer Pathfinder discovered many seamounts.

=== Director ===
Reaching the rank of rear admiral, Studds became the Director, U.S. Coast and Geodetic Survey, in May 1950. He served in this capacity, guiding the Survey through both civilian research and research related to supporting the U.S. armed forces in the Cold War, until he retired in August 1955.

== Awards ==
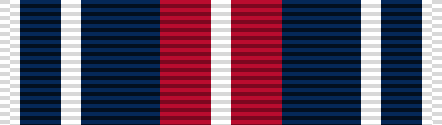
Department of Commerce Gold Medal

In a ceremony on February 16, 1953, in Washington, D.C., Studds was awarded the Department of Commerce Gold Medal for "outstanding contribution to the public service, the nation, or humanity."

== Personal life ==
Studds was married to the former Margaret Lee Milan. They had three children, John Anthony Studds, Sharon Lee Studds, and Michael Bowman Studds.

== Death ==
Studds died on May 28, 1962. He was buried at Arlington National Cemetery, in Arlington, Virginia.

== Commemoration ==
Studds Seamount, located in the North Pacific Ocean at approximately 46°N 155°W, was named for Studds.

Military offices
Preceded by Leo Otis Colbert	Director, United States Coast and Geodetic Survey; 1950–1955	Succeeded by H. Arnold Karo
