= USS Grayling =

USS Grayling has been the name of more than one United States Navy ship, and may refer to:

- USS Grayling (SS-18), a D-class submarine launched in 1909, renamed USS D-2 (SS-18) in 1911, and decommissioned in 1922
- USS Grayling (SP-289), a patrol vessel in commission from 1917 to 1919
- USS Grayling (SP-1259), a patrol vessel in commission from 1917 to 1918
- USS Grayling (SS-209), a Tambor-class submarine launched in 1940 and lost in September 1943
- USS Grayling (SS-492), a Tench-class submarine canceled in 1945 prior to construction
- USS Grayling (SSN-646), a Sturgeon-class submarine launched in 1967 and stricken in 1997
