= Murrough O'Brien =

Murrough O'Brien may refer to:

- Murrough O'Brien, 1st Earl of Thomond (died 1551)
- Murrough O'Brien, 4th Baron Inchiquin (died 1597)
- Murrough O'Brien, 1st Earl of Inchiquin (c. 1618–1674)
- Murrough O'Brien, 1st Marquess of Thomond (1726–1808)
- Morrough Parker O'Brien (1902–1988)
