= Marinduque (disambiguation) =

Marinduque is an island province of the Philippines.

Marinduque may also refer to:

- USC&GS Marinduque, a survey ship of the United States Coast and Geodetic Survey in commission from 1905 to 1932
- Marinduque language, a dialect of Tagalog
