= USC&GS Hydrographer =

USC&GS Hydrographer was the name of two United States Coast and Geodetic Survey ships, and may refer to:

- USC&GS Hydrographer (1901), a survey ship in service from 1901 to 1917 and from 1919 to 1928
- USC&GS Hydrographer (1928), a survey ship in service from 1931 to 1942 and from 1946 to 1967 with World War II U.S. Navy service as USS Hydrographer (AGS-2)
