= Romblon (disambiguation) =

Romblon may refer to:

- Romblon, an island province of the Philippines (part of Mimaropa)
- Romblon, Romblon, a municipality and the capital of the province of Romblon in the Philippines
- USC&GS Romblon, a survey ship in service with the United States Coast and Geodetic Survey from 1905 to 1921
