= Leo Otis Colbert =

United States Coast Guard officer

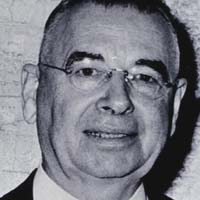
- Born: 31 December 1883; Cambridge, Massachusetts
- Died: 24 December 1968 (aged 84); Bethesda, Maryland
- Burial place: Baltimore National Cemetery; Baltimore, Maryland
- Military career
- Allegiance: United States of America
- Branch: United States Coast and Geodetic Survey Corps (1917; 1919–1950); United States Naval Reserve Force (1917–1919)
- Rank: Rear Admiral (Coast and Geodetic Sufrvey Corps); Lieutenant Commander (U.S. Naval Reserve Force)
- Commands: United States Coast and Geodetic Survey
- Conflicts: World War I; Atlantic U-boat campaign; World War II; Cold War
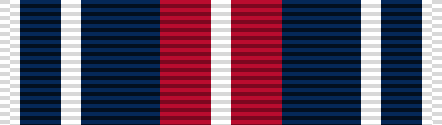
- Awards: Department of Commerce Gold Medal (1950)

Rear Admiral Leo Otis Colbert (31 December 1883 – 24 December 1968) was the third director of the United States Coast and Geodetic Survey and a career officer in the United States Coast and Geodetic Survey Corps, predecessor of the National Oceanic and Atmospheric Administration Commissioned Officer Corps.

== Early life ==
Colbert was born in Cambridge, Massachusetts, on 31 December 1883. After primary and secondary education in Boston, Massachusetts, he attended Tufts University, from which he graduated with a degree in civil engineering in 1907.

== Career ==
=== Early career ===
On 1 July 1907, Colbert began his career with the United States Coast and Geodetic Survey, which at the time was an entirely civilian organization. He served in coastal waters of the United States, Philippines, and Territory of Alaska as an civilian officer aboard ships of the Coast and Geodetic Survey's fleet of survey ships, serving as navigator and executive officer, and in 1912 he became a commanding officer for the first time, taking command of a survey ship in Alaskan waters.

=== World War I ===
After the United States entered World War I on the side of the Allies on 6 April 1917, Colbert became one of the original 119 commissioned officers of the Coast and Geodetic Survey Corps upon its creation as a new uniformed service of the United States on 22 May 1917, serving as a commissioned hydrographic and geodetic engineer. In accordance with Executive Order 2707, Colbert was among Coast and Geodetic Survey Corps officers transferred to the jurisdiction of the United States Department of the Navy for wartime service with the United States Navy. His first assignment was to the Seattle Field Station of the Coast and Geodetic Survey, and during this tour he also served as a navigation instructor at the Naval Camp at the University of Washington in Seattle, Washington.

On 23 February 1918, Colbert reported aboard the U.S. Navy troopship USS Northern Pacific at Puget Sound Navy Yard in Bremerton, Washington, for her voyage to New York City and assumed duties as assistant navigator and watch officer. Originally, he was supposed to detach from the ship in New York, but the ship's commanding officer retained him on board due a shortage of qualified watch officers and Colbert remained with Northern Pacific as she made her first transatlantic voyage as a troop transport to France, where she arrived at Brest in April 1918. After the ship's arrival in France, Colbert's assignment to her became permanent, with duties as a watch officer and division officer. On 4 August 1918, he was appointed a lieutenant commander in the United States Naval Reserve Force and became the ship's first lieutenant

In all, Colbert made nine voyages aboard Northern Pacific carrying troops from New York to Brest and returning to New York through Atlantic Ocean waters in which German submarines were conducting an antishipping campaign against Allied ships. After the conclusion of the war on 11 November 1918, Colbert made two more New York-to-Brest-and-return voyages. During one of these, Northern Pacific ran aground off Fire Island, New York, on 1 January 1919 while carrying many wounded troops back to the United States from France, necessitating transfers of the wounded to other vessels over the next four days as weather permitted. Northern Pacific was not refloated for 19 days.

Colbert's assignment to U.S. Navy duty came to an end on 29 March 1919.

=== Later career ===
On 30 March 1919, Colbert returned to duty in the Coast and Geodetic Survey Corps. In April 1920, the U.S. Steamboat Inspection Service issued him a certificate as Master of Steam Vessels, Unlimited Tonnage, Any Ocean. He had a tour of duty at Coast and Geodetic Survey headquarters in Washington, D.C., then served as Director of Coast Surveys in the Philippines from 1928 to 1930. From 1933 to 1938, he was the Chief of the Division of Charts at the Coast and Geodetic Survey's Washington, D.C., office, and during his tour the Division of Charts completed 87 aeronautical charts and began work on other series of special charts for long-distance flying.

In 1938, Colbert became the third director, Coast and Geodetic Survey, reaching the rank of rear admiral. During his 12 years as director, he oversaw the expanded activities of the Coast and Geodetic Survey as it supported the U.S. war effort during the U.S. participation in World War II from December 1941 to August 1945. He later guided the Coast and Geodetic Survey through the earliest years of the Cold War.

=== Retirement ===
Colbert retired as director of the Coast and Geodetic Survey on 7 April 1950 after a career of nearly 43 years, nearly 33 of them as an officer in the Coast and Geodetic Survey Corps.

== Professional life ==
Colbert was a member of the American Society of Civil Engineers, the American Geophysical Union, the American Society of Photogrammetry, the Society of Naval Architects and Marine Engineers, the Institute of Navigation, the American Shore and Beach Preservation Association, and the advisory council of the department of civil engineering at Princeton University. He was a director of the Society of American Military Engineers, a fellow of the Arctic Institute of North America, a life trustee of the National Geographic Society, and an honorary trustee of Woods Hole Oceanographic Institution. Colbert served as President of the American Shore and Beach Preservation Association from 1954-1958.

Tufts University awarded Colbert an honorary doctor of science degree in 1938 or 1939 (sources differ).

== Awards ==
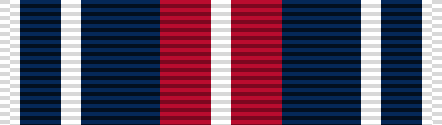
Department of Commerce Gold Medal

In a ceremony on 14 February 1950 in Washington, D.C., Colbert was awarded the Department of Commerce Gold Medal for "outstanding contribution to the public service, the nation, or humanity."

== Death ==
Colbert died on 24 December 1968 at Bethesda Naval Medical Center in Bethesda, Maryland, survived by his wife and two daughters. He was buried at Baltimore National Cemetery in Baltimore, Maryland, on 27 December 1968.

== Commemoration ==
The Society of American Military Engineers Colbert Medal – a NOAA Association decoration awarded to a member of the National Ocean Service, officer or civilian, active or retired, for the most outstanding contribution to military engineering through achievement in design, construction, administration, research, or development – is named for Colbert.

Military offices
Preceded by Raymond Stanton Patton	Director, United States Coast and Geodetic Survey; 1938–1950	Succeeded by Robert Francis Anthony Studds
