= Board of Engineers for Rivers and Harbors =

The Board of Engineers for Rivers and Harbors (BERH) was a federal board organized under the US Government's War Department (later, the Department of Defense), U.S. Army. It was a part of the civil works program of the United States Army Corps of Engineers. The board was created by the Rivers and Harbors Bill of 1902. The Board consisted of a group of Army engineer officers with a resident large staff including many civilian employees.

During World War II, the board established a branch to produce, maintain, and distribute intelligence concerning foreign ports and harbors. Following the war, the board continued performing that function until 1962 when it was absorbed by the newly organized US Army Area Analysis Intelligence Agency. The intelligence function of the Board of Engineers for Rivers and Harbors are discussed in the section on "The Statistical Division" (pages 125–127) in a 1980 official history.

In 1963, some functions of the Beach Erosion Board, another Army organization concerned with civil works, were transferred to the newly created US Army Coastal Engineering Research Center, while others were transferred to the Board of Engineers for Rivers and Harbors.

The Board of Engineers for Rivers and Harbors was disestablished by the Water Resources Development Act of 1992 which transferred its functions to the Chief of Engineers.

== Sources ==
A history of the Board of Engineers for Rivers and Harbors
