= USS Grayling (SP-1259) =

Patrol vessel of the United States Navy

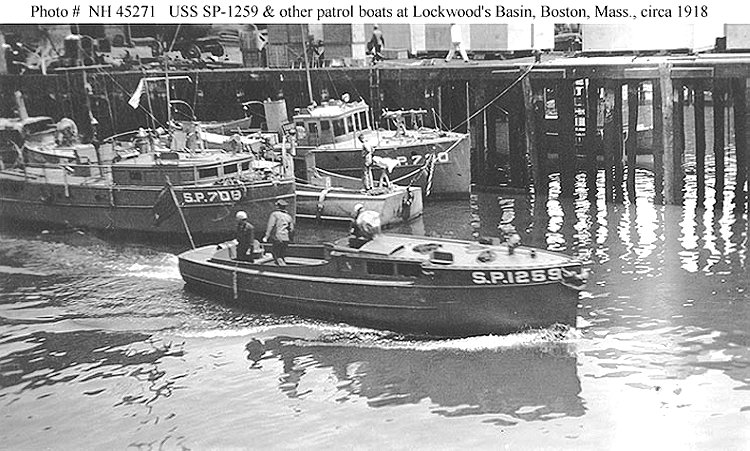
- USS Grayling departing Lockwood's Basin at Boston, Massachusetts, for a patrol during World War I. USS Elsie III (SP-708) and USS Lynx II (SP-730) are among the patrol boats in the background.

History

United States
- Name: USS Grayling
- Namesake: The grayling, a fresh-water game fish closely related to the trout (previous name retained)
- Builder: Boyden, Amesbury, Massachusetts
- Completed: 1915
- Acquired: 7 May 1917
- Commissioned: 22 May 1917
- Decommissioned: 15 January 1919
- Fate: Returned to owner 30 November 1918
- Notes: Operated as civilian motorboat Grayling 1915-1917 and from November 1918

General characteristics
- Type: Patrol vessel
- Tonnage: 4 tons
- Length: 33 ft 6 in (10.21 m)
- Beam: 7 ft (2.1 m)
- Draft: 2 ft 10 in (0.86 m)
- Speed: 14 knots
- Complement: 3
- Armament: 1 × machine gun

The second USS Grayling (SP-1259) was a United States Navy patrol vessel in commission from 1917 to 1918.

== History ==
Grayling was built as a civilian motorboat of the same name in 1915 by Boyden at Amesbury, Massachusetts. The U.S. Navy acquired her from her owner, E. E. Gray, on 7 May 1917 for World War I service as a patrol vessel. She was commissioned on 22 May 1917 as USS Grayling (SP-1259).

Assigned to the 1st Naval District and based at Boston, Massachusetts, Grayling served on section patrol duties in Boston Harbor for the remainder of World War I.

Grayling was then returned to Gray on 30 November 1918.

- Grayling is distinct from USS Grayling (SP-289), a different patrol vessel in commission during World War I.
