= Brachymeles pathfinderi =

Pathfinder short-legged skink

Conservation status
- Least Concern (IUCN 3.1)

Scientific classification
- Kingdom: Animalia
- Phylum: Chordata
- Class: Reptilia
- Order: Squamata
- Family: Scincidae
- Genus: Brachymeles
- Species: B. pathfinderi

Binomial name
- Brachymeles pathfinderi Taylor, 1925
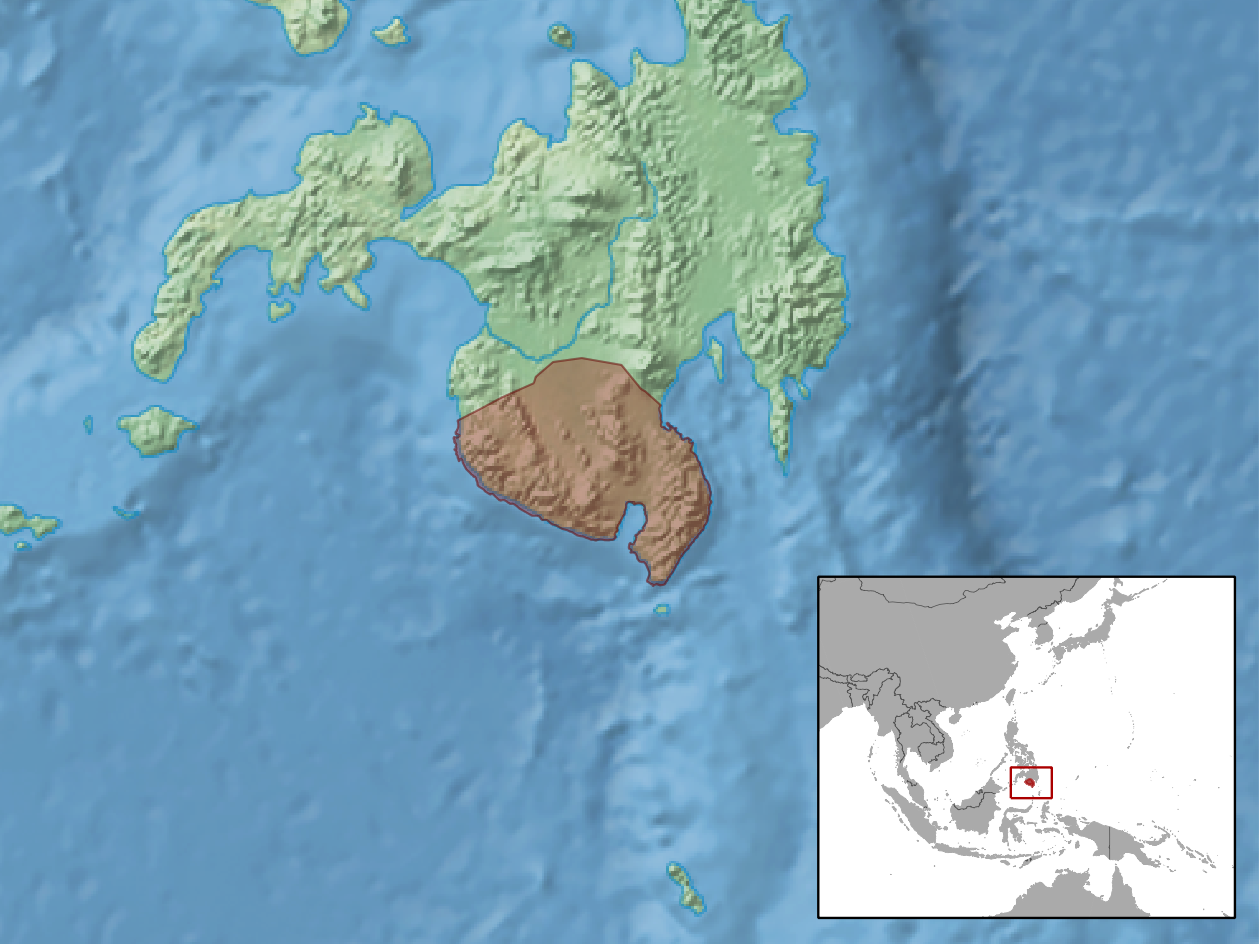
- Geographic distribution of Brachymeles pathfinderi

Species of lizard

Brachymeles pathfinderi, also known commonly as the pathfinder short-legged skink and the Cotabato worm skink, is a species of semifossorial lizard in the subfamily Scincinae of the family Scincidae. The species is endemic to the southern Philippines. First described in 1925 by American herpetologist Edward Harrison Taylor, it is notable for its slender body, highly reduced limbs, and the unusual condition of having five minute clawed toes on the forelimbs and four on the hind limbs. The species is known almost exclusively from the vicinity of Glan in southern Mindanao and remains one of the least-documented members of its genus.

== Etymology ==
The specific name, pathfinderi, commemorates the United States Coast and Geodetic Survey steamship Pathfinder.

== Taxonomy and phylogenetic relationships ==
Brachymeles pathfinderi was originally described by Taylor in 1925 from material collected on a headland near Glan in what was then Cotabato Province, Mindanao. For many years, these specimens remained the only known examples, and the species was regarded as one of the least-documented members of its genus. Later taxonomic work continued to support its distinctiveness, emphasizing its unique limb morphology and overall body form.

Subsequent examination of a larger series of specimens from the same region provided a clearer understanding of its diagnostic characters and evolutionary placement. These assessments confirmed that the species belongs to a group of Philippine skinks exhibiting varying degrees of limb reduction, and showed that it is part of a lineage associated with semifossorial habits.

Interestingly, B. pathfinderi exhibits an asymmetric digit condition, five digits on the forelimbs and four on the hind limbs, which distinguishes it from most other limb-reduced Brachymeles. Phylogenetic evidence suggests that such digit asymmetry evolved independently multiple times within the genus, reflecting repeated shifts toward burrowing adaptations in different island lineages. Despite the morphological similarity shared across many members of this genus, this species appears to represent a distinct and geographically localized form with no closely related species currently identified.

== Geographic distribution and habitat ==
Brachymeles pathfinderi is known only from southern Mindanao in the Philippines, with all verified records originating from the vicinity of Glan, Sarangani Province (formerly Cotabato Province). The locality of a reported specimen from “Tatayan, Cotobato” (Taylor 1944) is considered unreliable and potentially erroneous.

B. pathfinderi appears to be restricted to low elevations, likely below 900–1,200 m (2,950–3,940 ft) above sea level. Confirmed modern records occur at sea level. The region surrounding the type locality is composed largely of lowland forests, agricultural land, and coconut plantations.

The species is semifossorial and typically found within loose soil, leaf litter, rotting logs, root networks, and piles of decomposing organic matter. Recent collections indicate that it persists not only in second-growth forest but also in agricultural environments, particularly mature coconut plantations, where individuals have been located beneath rotting coconut husks and within decaying wood.

== Description ==
Brachymeles pathfinderi is a small, slender skink with strongly reduced limbs. The forelimbs bear five minute clawed digits, whereas the hind limbs have only four. Adult snout-to-vent length (SVL) ranges from 58 to 61 mm (2.3 to 2.4 in). The ear opening is minute, and the species lacks a postnasal scale. Midbody scale rows range from 22 to 23. There are 59–67 scales in the paravertebral scale row, between the parietals and the base of the tail.

These morphological traits reflect adaptations for a semifossorial lifestyle and are consistent with the body form observed in other limb-reduced species of Brachymeles.

== Reproduction ==
Brachymeles pathfinderi is ovoviviparous, giving birth to live young. Aside from the reproductive mode inferred from congeneric species, specific details regarding clutch size, gestation, or breeding season remain unknown.
