= Morrough Parker O'Brien =

American hydraulic engineering professor (1902–1988)

- Born: September 21, 1902; Hammond, Indiana, U.S.
- Died: July 28, 1988 (aged 85); Cuernavaca, Mexico
- Other name: Mike O'Brien
- Education: B.S in Civil Engineering, Massachusetts Institute of Technology (1925)
- Known for: MOJS equation
- Awards: Department of Defense Distinguished Civilian Service Award: ASEE Benjamin Garver Lamme award; Florida Shore and Beach Preservation Association's Bill Carlton award (1979); University of California's Clark Kerr Award (1988)

Morrough "Mike" Parker O'Brien Jr. (September 21, 1902 – July 28, 1988) was an American hydraulic engineering professor and is considered the founder of modern coastal engineering. In addition to his academic work, O'Brien served as a consultant on a variety of government and private sector projects including work for General Electric. O'Brien's government career culminated in a presidential appointment to the National Science Board.

== Early life and education ==
O'Brien, the only child of Morrough O'Brien Sr. and Lulu Avis Parker was born in Hammond, Indiana on September 21, 1902. O'Brien grew up in South Bend, Indiana until age ten, then Phoenix, Arizona for two years before moving to Toledo, Ohio where he attended St. John's High School. O'Brien then attended St. John's College in Toledo for his freshman year of college and Holy Cross College for his sophomore year before finally matriculating at Massachusetts Institute of Technology (MIT). Two years later in 1927, O'Brien was one of seven recipients of a scholarship from John R. Freeman to study hydraulic engineering at the Techniche Hauptschule of Danzig for six weeks followed by a year studying at the Royal College of Engineering in Stockholm. O'Brien took a second Freeman scholarship in France while also working at United States Bureau of Foreign and Domestic Commerce office in with the American legation in Stockholm.His grandfather and grandmother on his fathers side were born in Ireland.

== Career ==
=== Academia ===
In 1928, O'Brien returned from studies in Europe and accepted an assistant professorship of mechanical engineering at University of California, Berkeley. O'Brien was advanced to associate professor in 1931 and to full-professorship and chair of the mechanical engineering department in 1937. From 1943 to 1959 he served as the dean of the university's newly created college of engineering. Clark Kerr credited O'Brien with improving Berkeley's standing in the field of engineering schools from mid-tier to on par with the schools like MIT. In 1950 O'Brien was one of the "Committee of Seven" opposing Regent John Francis Neylan's call to fire any faculty refusing to sign a loyalty oath meant to target communist sympathizers. That same year he helped organize the first International Conference on Coastal Engineering. In the proceedings of the conference O'Brien coined the term coastal engineering. Because of his long career in the field O'Brien is considered the founder of modern coastal engineering.

During O'Brien's tenure as dean, Berkeley acquired the Richmond Field Station for O'Brien's engineering laboratories. In 1959, the university recognized O'Brien's lifetime contributions by awarding him the title of "dean emeritus" and a LL.D. concurrent with his retirement. He was also awarded a D.Sc. by Northwestern University and a D.Eng. by Purdue. O'Brien Hall, the home of Berkeley's Hydraulic Engineering Lab, was named in his honor. In 1962 O'Brien and colleague Dwight Vorkoeper received a patent for their hydraulically actuated divisible-wedge log splitter. 12 linear feet of O'Brien's documents are archived in University of California, Riverside's Water Resources Collection.

=== Government and other private sector work ===
Upon graduating from MIT in 1925 O'Brien worked for the Hudson River Regulating District, at the Green Island dam on the Sacandaga River, which was owned at the time by Henry Ford. Because Ford refused to pay interest on loans from banks work at the dam dried up and O'Brien accepted an assistant professorship in civil engineering at Purdue University during the academic year, returning to work at the dam the next two summers. In the late 1920s O'Brien collected measurements of air and water currents as well as tides and beach profiles in New Jersey on behalf of the American Shore and Beach Preservation Association to address the problem of beach erosion.

In 1930, O'Brien became a founding member of the Beach Erosion Board having been hired two years earlier by its predecessor organization. His interest in beach erosion led him to author a seven-volume study of the entire United States Pacific coastline, A Report on Sand Movement and Beach Erosion Along the Pacific Coast of the United States, in which he both addressed every American inlet and harbor on the Pacific and documented the phenomenon of littoral drift. O'Brien continued to serve as a member of the Beach Erosion Board and beyond 1963, its successor organization, the Coastal Engineering Research Center until his retirement in 1978. In the late 1930s O'Brien did consulting work for Weyerhaeuser Company to improve the flow in their log ponds. He also provided consultation on the placement of caissons during the construction of the ill-fated Tacoma Narrows Bridge. O'Brien had also been on the consulting board of the Waterways Experiment Station.

During World War II, O'Brien was employed as an adviser for the Bureau of Ships. He worked on several government projects and contracts including work on the development of FMC Corporation's Landing Vehicle Tracked. In light of the difficult amphibious landings during the Battle of Tarawa, O'Brien along with other colleagues at Berkeley as well as H. U. Sverdrup developed a method of determining the depth of coastal water based on the height of the ocean waves. After the war, O'Brien led tests in the Chesapeake Bay to predict the effects of an underwater nuclear detonation in preparation for Operation Crossroads testing. O'Brien also had a long career as a technical consultant to General Electric, particularly their aerospace division, where he contributed to the development of axial-flow jet engines. O'Brien was elected to their Propulsion Hall of Fame in 1984. From 1958 to 1960 O'Brien was appointed by President Eisenhower to serve on the National Science Board. From 1961 to 1965 O'Brien served on the Defense Science Board as well as chairman of the Army Scientific Advisory Panel of which he had been a member since 1954.

== Published works ==
- A Report on Sand Movement and Beach Erosion Along the Pacific Coast of the United States. Beach Erosion Board. 1931. OCLC 27307353.
- —; Hickox, George Harold (1934). Elements of fluid mechanics with applications to hydraulics. University of California.
- Mouth of Columbia River Beach Erosion Investigations: Laboratory study of transportation of Columbia River bed materials. Experiment 13a; Issue 11 of Technical memorandum. U.S. Tidal Model Laboratory. 1936. ASIN B0008C6QO4.
- —; Hickox, George Harold (1937). Applied fluid mechanics. McGraw-Hill Book Company. OCLC 187480687.
- —; Johnson, Joe William (June 1947). "Wartime Research on Waves and Surf". The Military Engineer. Vol. 39, no. 260. pp. 239–242. OCLC 27658365.
- Notes on tidal inlets on sandy shores. Waterways Experiment Station. February 1976. ASIN B0006XQBEA.
