= USC&GSS Pathfinder =

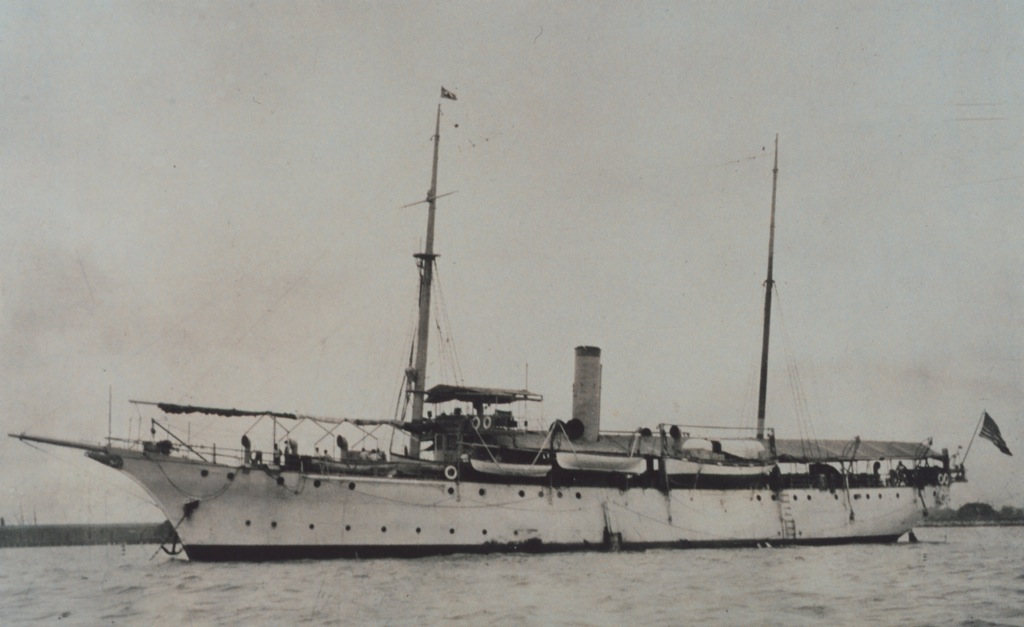
- The Coast and Geodetic Survey Ship Pathfinder in the Philippines in the early 1900s. This was the first Pathfinder. NOAA Photo Library: Image ID: ship0236, NOAA's Fleet Then and Now – Sailing for Science Collection

History

United States
- Name: Pathfinder
- Owner: United States Coast and Geodetic Survey
- Operator: United States Coast and Geodetic Survey
- Builder: Crescent Shipyard at Morris Heights, New Jersey
- Cost: $169,993
- Completed: 1898
- In service: 1899-January 30, 1942
- Renamed: Research 1941
- Fate: Beached in sinking condition January 30, 1942
- Notes: Call sign: GVWC

General characteristics
- Type: Survey ship
- Length: 196.25 ft (59.82 m)
- Beam: 33.5 ft (10.2 m)
- Draft: 13 ft (4.0 m)
- Depth of hold: 19.66 ft (5.99 m)
- Decks: Three
- Installed power: Triple expansion steam engines developing 846 horsepower or 1,173 horsepower under forced draft
- Sail plan: Brigantine-rigged, 4,500 square feet of canvas
- Speed: 10.5 to 13 knots
- Range: 5,000 miles
- Notes: Specifically built for Alaska service

The first USC&GSS Pathfinder, also noted in some NOAA histories as "old Pathfinder", was a United States Coast and Geodetic Survey ship in service from 1899 to 1941, when she was beached in sinking condition on January 30, 1942, after 40 years service in the Philippines.

== Construction and characteristics ==
The Secretary of Commerce's Annual Report ending fiscal year 1900 contains the report of Frank Walley Perkins, Assistant, Coast and Geodetic Survey, Commanding, Pathfinder with the following a summary of his comments on construction and ship's characteristics.

The ship was built at the Crescent Shipyard, Elizabethport, New Jersey launched December 7, 1898. She was a three deck steel ship of extra strength built for work in the Aleutian Archipelago where strong currents, distances from supply bases required a vessel of considerable power and coal capacity. She had 15 water tight compartments with dimensions of 196' 3" over all, 33' 6" beam, 19' 8" "depth of hold" and equipped for sea draws 13'. She is brigantine-rigged with some 4,500 square feet of canvas and a single, 10' diameter 13' pitch, screw. Her vertical triple expansion steam engines with twenty-eight inch stroke developed 846 horsepower or 1,173 horsepower under forced draft with a speed of 10.5 to 13 knots. Her range was estimated at about 5,000 miles with a bunker capacity of 240 tons of coal. She was entirely steel with three decks. This report begins using the name "U. S. S. Pathfinder," possibly causing some later confusion as the ship was always Coast and Geodetic Survey and never commissioned in the Navy.

According to an account by one of the ship's commanding officers, she was "built by Lewis Nixon . . . using the plans of the Vanderbilt (Note: Nourmahal (1884) was built for John Jacob Astor, not Vanderbilt.) Yacht, the Nourmahal because the appropriation was too small to cover the ship the Survey desired.

== Initial voyage Washington-Honolulu ==
Frank Walley Perkins took command June 1, 1898 (Note: The NOAA web page titled Pathfinder with photo has Captain John F. Pratt in command. More complete references at NOAA's site, in particular the Fiscal Year 1900 Annual Report, show Captain Frank W. Perkins taking the ship around South America to Hawaii and Captain Pratt assuming command later for work in the Philippines.) and on the 7th sailed to Hampton Roads with a 65-man Navy enlisted crew with Coast Survey officers. The ship was not equipped for the transit with deep-sea sounding equipment for survey work but there was hope for observations that could be made without the deep sounding gear.

On March 17, 1899, a board appointed by the Secretary of the Treasury consisting of two Survey officers, two Revenue-Marine Service officers and a United States local inspector of boilers made trial runs on the new ship which demonstrated compliance with requirements. The minimum specified speed of twelve knots was bettered, and she could make more than thirteen knots under forced draft.

Pathfinder left Newport News on the morning of June 16, 1899 bound for to San Francisco and onward to Honolulu by way of the Straits of Magellan. The first stop was St. Lucia in the Lesser Antilles by way of the Anegada Passage. Near Guadeloupe successful experiments were made with the Kelvin sounding machine which was used afterwards in depths between 20 and 100 fathoms. The ship reached St. Lucia on 23 June, coaled and sailed on 25 June bound for Brazil. With yellow fever raging in Bahia the destination was changed to Recife, Pernambuco, Brazil, arriving there on 6 July. After making some magnetic observations, despite constant rain, the Pathfinder sailed for Rio de Janeiro on 11 July arriving on 16 July. There the ship entertained U.S. officials with a circuit of the bay enjoying the scenery before departing on 22 July for Montevideo, Uruguay. Departure was on 4 August, the day after a celebration in the city with ships dressed with bunting by day and electric lights by night with the note that this was "an agreeable picture of our last sight of civilization" before the Straits of Magellan.

On 9 July the ship began its transit of the straits with anchorages at night. "Typical straits weather" was described as wind fresh from eastward bringing "fog, rain and snow with clearer intervals" and the ship noted anchorages often had boards nailed to trees naming the vessels that had used the anchorages. Making some observations on the way the ship exited the straits into the Pacific after spending the night of 15 August at an anchorage at Isla Wager known as Port Ballenas. In summation the report notes of the passage "it is most famous for its dangers and discomforts; yet, for grandeur and picturesqueness its scenery has probably few rivals."

On 20 August Pathfinder arrived at Valparaíso, Chile, a city still showing effects of a storm that had damaged the waterfront and mud filled streets, stopping only long enough for mail before departing for Callao, Peru where bunkers had to be replenished as coal was nearly exhausted. Departing 30 August the ship headed for California. Due to a case of suspected appendicitis the ship diverted to San Diego which was reached on 14 September where the patient, cadet James J. Sylvester, was put ashore but did not survive an operation. On 17 September the Pathfinder arrived at San Francisco.

While at San Francisco the ship was hauled out for bottom cleaning, final equipping and some changes based on observations made during the transit. The work as made difficult by the "great emergency calls on the part of the army transport service" (Note: The date corresponds to the first fall of the Philippine–American War which began 4 February 1899 and the last stages of the Filipino nationalists led by Emilio Aguinaldo attempting conventional warfare before shifting to guerilla-style warfare for several years. The Army Transport Service was established to meet demands and deficiencies recognized in the Spanish–American War and was very active in the Philippines throughout its history until WW II and its absorption into the Transportation Corps.) causing delay in getting bids for the work. The vessel was ready for sea again on 17 November 1899 sailing on 22 November for Honolulu steaming into a gale for a week. Shortly after noon on 2 December 1899 Pathfinder moored in Honolulu.

== Service history ==
=== Hawaii ===
Pathfinder engaged in surveys in the Hawaiian Islands until the end of March 1900 when she departed for Alaska by way of Seattle.

=== Alaska ===
At the end of the fiscal year, June 30, 1900, the ship was engaged in surveys in the Bering Sea. On October 5, 1900 Pathfinder departed Dutch Harbor for San Francisco, arriving October 14 and departing for Alaska April 18, 1901 by way of Seattle and Victoria, British Columbia where a "submarine sentry" (Note: Explanation and value of the device is explained in the report. "The 'submarine sentry' proved to be very valuable. The device is set to give warning when any required depth is reached, and when the vessel passes over a spot with that depth of water on it, the sentry bell rings and a 'kite' is tripped and comes to the surface, thus giving warning in time to steer away from danger. The 'sentry' is reliable for any depth up to 25 fathoms with one 'kite' and 40 fathoms with the other, and it is also provided with a tube for sounding in the same manner as with the Kelvin machine.") was acquired. The ship arrived at Dutch Harbor on May 16 commencing work on June 30. July 1, 1901 found the ship surveying the Fox Island Passes in the vicinity of Dutch Harbor until October 7 when she was ordered to the Philippines by way of Yokohama and Nagasaki, Japan arriving at Manila on November 18, 1901.

=== The Philippines ===
The ship was ordered to the Philippines to conduct hydrographic surveys supporting operations following the Spanish–American War. The Pathfinder would remain in and around the Philippines until her end on January 30, 1942, in the catastrophic events surrounding the fall of Corregidor.

On April 12, 1902 Pathfinder sailed to Amoy, China, for general overhaul and installation of an ice plant sent from New York, returning to Manila on May 26, 1902. The Pathfinder's coal and refrigeration capacity enabled her to remain on the survey grounds returning to Manila only once a year for maintenance. Installation of "wireless telegraph" communications in October 1913 facilitated operations. Over her forty years in the Philippines the ship was the largest of what became a Coast & Geodetic Survey fleet and the only one of four or five (Note: Report of the Suprentendent Of The Coast And Geodetic Survey for FY 1910 lists five vessels actively surveying: Pathfinder, Romblon, Marinduque, Fathomer and Research, the last acquired by the Insular Government in 1901 and the first C&GS vessel to operate in the Philippines.) such vessels owned by the United States Government rather than the Philippine Insular Government.

Initially that mission in the Philippines involved an intergovernmental dispute with the U.S. Navy Hydrographic Office over charting authority of territorial waters. Despite frequent interchange of personnel and ships the division of responsibility was that of the Coast and Geodetic Survey charting U.S. territorial waters and lands with the Hydrographic Office responsible for areas outside U.S. territory. Acquisition of territories such as the Philippines extended the Coast and Geodetic Survey responsibility into previously Hydrographic Office areas of responsibility.

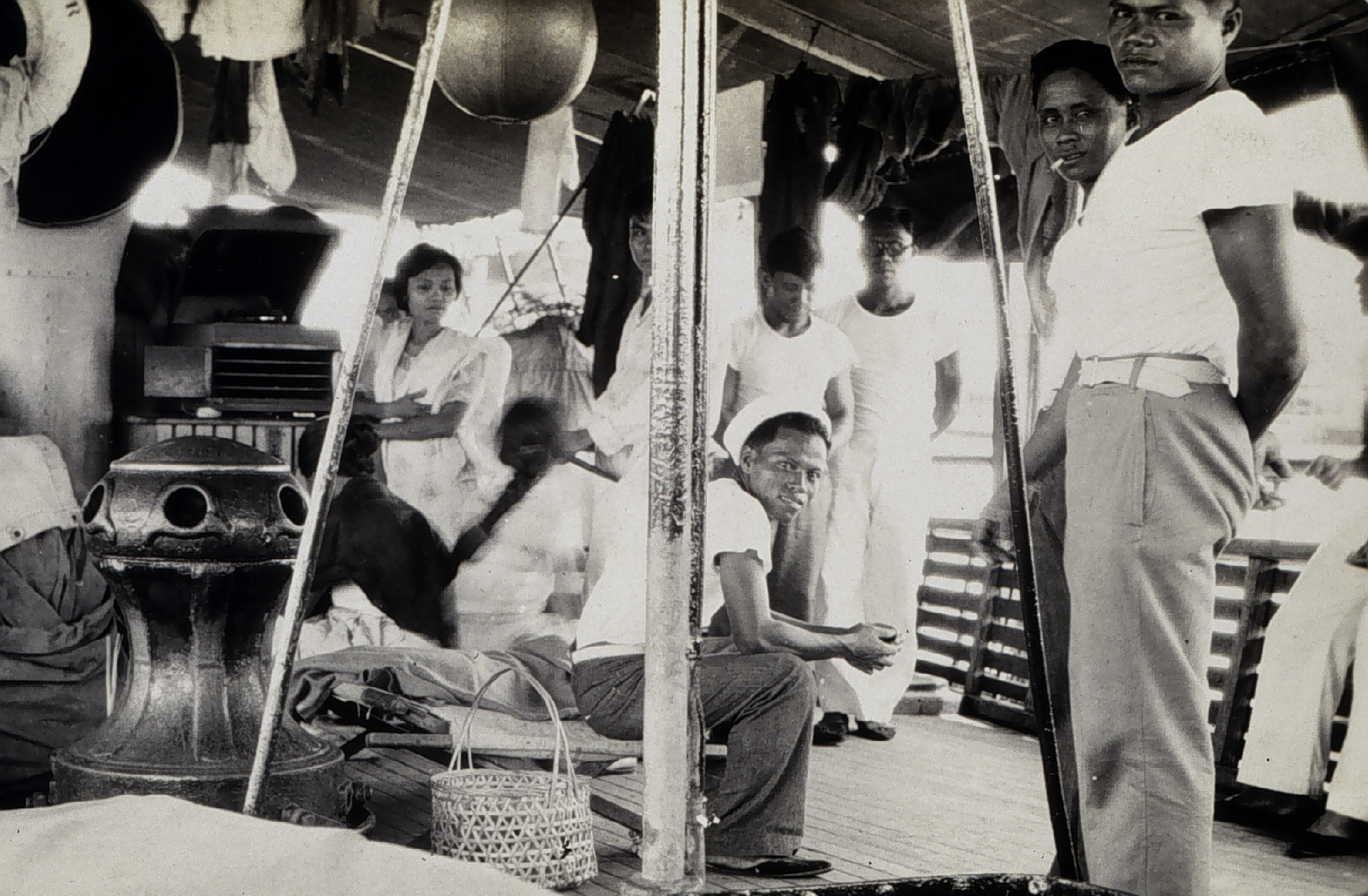
Some of the crew with family and friends on a Sunday afternoon. On the foredeck of the Pathfinder. (NOAA Photo Library Image ID: theb3265, NOAA's Fleet Then and Now - Sailing for Science Collection)

In later years the Pathfinder was largely crewed by Filipinos with USC&GS officers. In the late thirties the crew was described as "a crew of 80 men and nine officers. Except for myself, the commanding officer and the engineer, they were all Filipino" with eight cadets preparing to take over operations with independence. At the time war was declared and Pathfinder under her new name Research was lost the Coast and Geodetic Survey had five commissioned officers, two civilians and an additional force surveying and charting in Philippine waters of "some 200 in number and all but two being Filipinos" employed by the Insular Government.

==== Surveys ====
After return from overhaul in Amoy, China to Manila on May 26, 1902, the ship sailed on June 6, 1902, for surveys of the San Bernardino Strait and its approaches along the coasts of Samar and Luzon.

Of particular importance was establishing the geodesy supporting a Philippine datum for both land mapping and nautical charting. It was not until 1906 that the Luzon Datum was extended to outlying islands to tie local systems based on nineteen separate astronomical stations with eventual establishment of the datum in 1911 with Pathfinder continuing development of the geodetic network into the late 1930s. The ship's officers introduced triangulation by intersection of the ship, previously developed by the Hydrographic Survey of Canada, to the service in overcoming the difficult terrain of the islands.

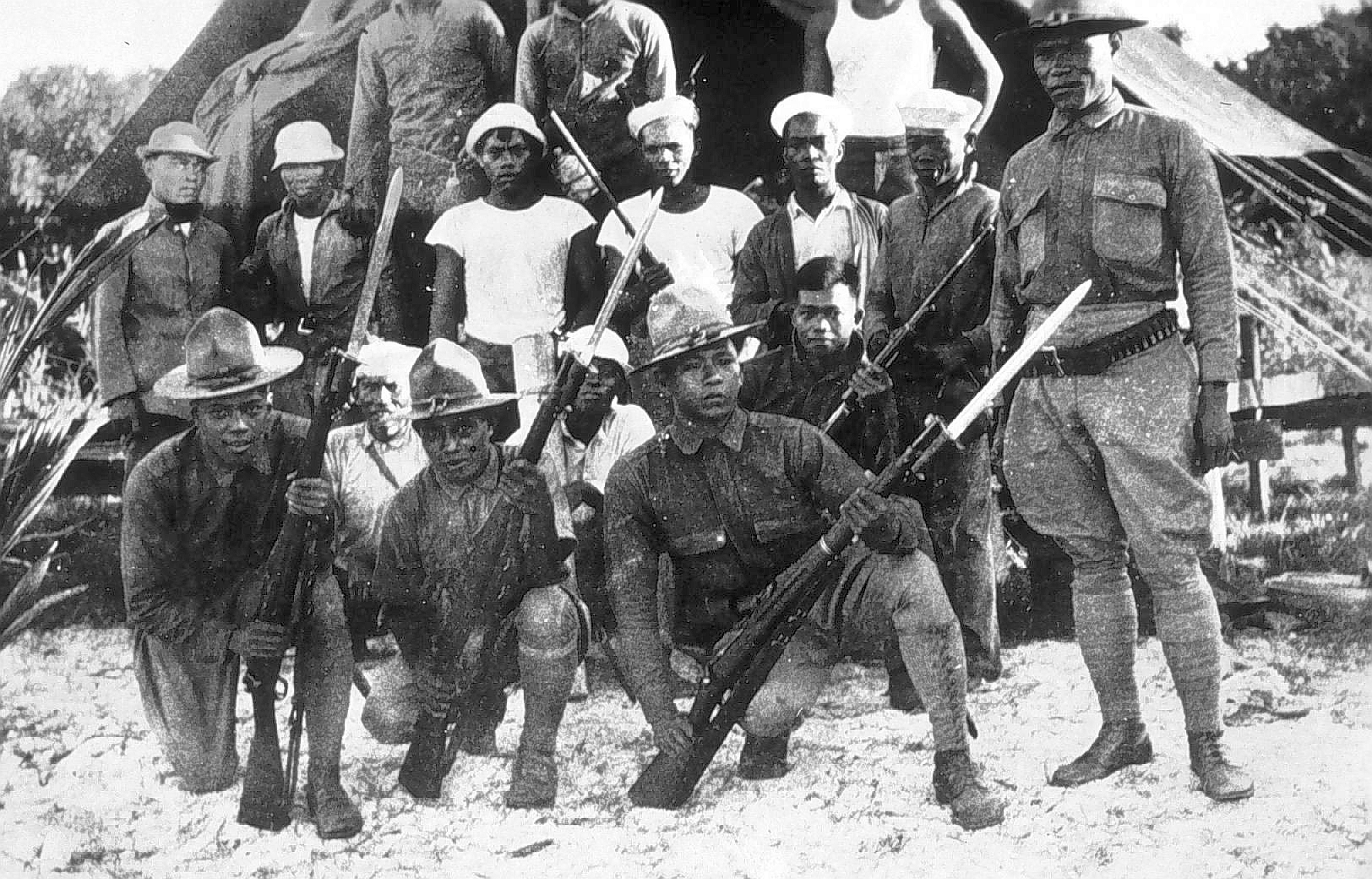
"The Philippine constabulary guard with shore party of Hubert A. Paton. Off the Pathfinder", Philippines, 1926 from the Historic Coast & Geodetic Survey (C&GS) Collection, NOAA Photo Library.

Survey summaries are available in annual reports of the Coast And Geodetic Survey to the Secretary Of Commerce that indicate the nature of surveying in waters previously not charted using the science of the time. Establishing the geodetic basis for survey navigation was of particular difficulty and linking such networks between islands was a major operation. The following, based on the fiscal year 1920 Pathfinder reports, gives an idea of work about mid way in the ship's Philippine survey history.

===== Fiscal Year 1920 survey summary =====
Pathfinder began the fiscal year, starting July 1, 1919, undergoing repairs at Olongapo Naval Station. She departed 18 September 1919 for Manila for fumigation and supplies and on 26 September steamed for Cavite to coal and obtain additional supplies. The 1920 survey locations were driven by the Navy's discontinuance of coaling the C&GS ships; therefore, work took place convenient to an offer of coal by the governor of Mindanao and coal mines at Sandakan, Borneo. On 30 September the ship arrived at Dapitan, Mindanao and with the C&GS vessel Marinduque surveyed the west coast of Mindanao between Dapitan and Zamboanga at the request of the governor of Mindanao. Surveys began with a search for a reported reef in Dapitan Bay that was located and found to be a "serious menace." Survey parties began establishing ranges and triangulation signals on visible peaks and establishing a typhoon refuge at each end of the area. On 14 October Pathfinder was forced to seek shelter from a severe typhoon in Dapitan Bay.

On 1 April 1920 Pathfinder was in Manila for repairs with field parties from the ship engaged in topographic and hydrographic surveying, including the Cavite naval anchorage in anticipation of the arrival of a destroyer division in May. She sailed 21 April for surveys off Negros until a casualty to the Sigsbee sounding reel limited operations. Coal was not available as expected and the ship had to sail to a mine at Sebatik, Borneo to fill bunkers; arriving 29 April after a difficult voyage through reefs and strong currents. Pathfinder's submarine sentry warned of the reef at Pearl Bank until its light was extinguished, so that the vessel hove to until daylight.

Pathfinder sailed the evening of 30 April for the survey area and ran lines from Sulu to Mindanao before heading to Zamboanga for supplies where they found food stocks almost exhausted due to an inter island maritime strike. The ship obtained what it could, surveyed westward from northern Mindanao, except for a stop off Palawan for fresh beef, then worked continuously until fuel and supplies were nearly exhausted and the last available sounding reel broke. The ship reached Sandakan on 4 June where reels were repaired and supplies obtained. The ship resumed work on 7 June, with a stop at Sulu for beef, until radio instructions were received on 21 June to return to Manila, arriving 25 June. Pathfinder arrived at Olongapo Naval Station and was placed in dry dock on 26 June.

==== Layup and recommissioning at Manila ====
The Annual Report of the Secretary of Commerce for 1933 notes that Pathfinder with two Insular Government C&GS vessels in operation with Pathfinder surveying on the north and northwest Luzon coasts and on the west coast of Palawan but that on "account of the curtailment of the regular appropriations for the 1934 fiscal year" Pathfinder was laid up at Manila indefinitely.

In the spring of 1938 Fathomer, an Insular Government owned C&GS ship, was decommissioned and Pathfinder recommissioned with assignment to surveys on the southeast coast of Luzon. The ship, laid up awaiting disposal, was brought out, recommissioned at the request of the Insular Government, renamed Research, after the USC&GSS Research of 1901 that was the first C&GS survey ship in the Philippines, and operated with funding from the Insular Government. The renaming was required as a new ship being constructed in Seattle, Washington was to bear the name Pathfinder. The 1941 report, the first showing the immediate prelude to war, shows the ship surveying in the Sulu Sea and then taking up operations in Manila Bay.

==== Other Events ====
===== Typhoons =====
On September 25, 1905, during the "Cantabria Typhoon," Pathfinder was caught directly in the center of the storm while anchored in San Policarpo Bay on the east coast of Samar where she recorded a minimum pressure of 690.12 mm. By going full speed against the wind blowing offshore the vessel was able to relieve strain on the anchor. When the wind reversed as the eye passed the ship broke free and was grounded. The ship was towed to Manila, arriving October 8, 1905, for major repairs including removal and straightening of a number of hull plates and sending the stern frame to Hong Kong for rewelding. Pathfinder was unable to leave Manila for surveys until February 17, 1906. On November 6, 1909, a typhoon caused the "total wreck" of Pathfinder's steam launch and the loss of a whaleboat.

Autumn 1912 brought major disruption with the Director, Coast Surveys Philippines noting it being "notable as being one of the most stormy and disastrous seasons that have been known in the Philippine Islands" with "severe typhoons" on November 6, 25, 26 and December 15–16. During the storm on the 15th Pathfinder lost one of its survey launches in Cebu Harbor with the steamer Marinduque stranded on the coast of Palawan with survey signals destroyed over a wide area and both Pathfinder and Marinduque out of service undergoing repairs for five and four and a half months respectively. January found the ship in Hong Kong for extensive upkeep and repair, leaving April 8, 1913 and arriving Manila on April 11, but not returning to survey until May 19.

===== Incidents, rescues and other assistance =====
Pathfinder supplied keepers of Tanguingui Light after they had been out of provisions for two days on 27 March 1910 while in transit to Surigao via Cebu delivering mail for the poastal authority. During October 1912 the ship was in Cebu where a Pathfinder boat crew rescued other seamen during a typhoon. On 28 May 1915 the survey ship towed the four-masted schooner Alpene that was disabled off the entrance to San Bernardino Straits to a safe location. In June 1916 the ship, commanded by H.C. Denson, was on the coast of Palawan when it received a wireless SOS from the Spanish Royal Mail Line steamer Fernando Poo that was wrecked in the Sulu Sea. The Pathfinder steamed 180 miles to the rescue saving fifty.

Pathfinder abandoned work during October, 1912, on the southeast coast of Mindanao when an uprising of mountain tribes made survey work in the interior dangerous.

On November 8, 1918, the entire ship's complement was stricken with influenza while working in Palawan. The ship had not heard of the worldwide epidemic and thus the sudden occurrence alarmed the ship's company greatly. Eight of the Filipino crew died and others did not recover for a month. Romblon, herself stricken by a milder epidemic, was sent with an additional medical officer, but Pathfinder was forced to Manila for hospital facilities. So many of the crew were in no condition to return to sea that many sought discharges, and the ship returned to work December 8 with an almost new crew.

=== Final days as USC&GS Research ===
Surveys were conducted in and around the Philippine Islands until lost in Manila Bay during the outbreak of World War II. The cost of the surveys had been shared by the U.S. and the Insular governments and the ship, still the property of the United States, had been informally transferred to the Insular government with Coast and Geodetic Survey officers in command. The ship surveyed in the Coron Passage, north of Palawan, off Bataan and Mariveles Bay in the days immediately before the war.

There are differing accounts of the details of the ship's loss, one being that she was scuttled, another that she was bombed. According to Commander Edward "Ted" Morris, then in command of the ship, a bomb hit a launch that was alongside the ship and caused fires that were controlled but during the night the Army gave orders to take the ship to Corregidor or scuttle with him taking the ship to Corregidor where she sank from further damage, was re-floated on an incoming tide and finally beached in sinking condition on January 30, 1942 on the coast of Bataan.

Eleanor Roosevelt Dall Boettiger, granddaughter of President Roosevelt, christened a new Pathfinder launched January 11, 1942.

== Legacy ==
The first Pathfinder is commemorated in the scientific name of a species of Filipino lizard, Brachymeles pathfinderi, which was described in 1925 by American herpetologist Edward Harrison Taylor.
