= USS Grayling (SP-289) =

Patrol vessel of the United States Navy

History

United States
- Name: USS Grayling
- Namesake: The grayling, a fresh-water game fish closely related to the trout (previous name retained)
- Builder: Peterson, New York
- Acquired: 22 May 1917
- Commissioned: 22 May 1917
- Decommissioned: 15 January 1919
- Fate: Returned to owner 15 January 1919

General characteristics
- Type: Patrol vessel
- Tonnage: 4 tons
- Length: 50 ft (15 m)
- Beam: 10 ft 3 in (3.12 m)
- Draft: 3 ft (0.91 m)
- Speed: 10 knots
- Armament: 1 × 1-pounder gun

The third USS Grayling (SP-289) was a United States Navy patrol vessel in commission from 1917 to 1919.

Grayling was built as a civilian motorboat of the same name by Peterson on the Hudson River in New York. The U.S. Navy acquired her from her owner, Myer Resebush, on 22 May 1917 for World War I service as a patrol vessel. She was commissioned the same day as USS Grayling (SP-289.

Grayling served on section patrol duties on local and coastal waters around Norfolk, Virginia, for the remainder of World War I.

Grayling was decommissioned on 15 January 1919 and returned to Resebush the same day.

Grayling is distinct from USS Grayling (SP-1259), a different patrol vessel in commission during World War I.
