= American Shore and Beach Preservation Association =

Non-profit organization

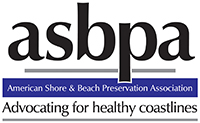
- Abbreviation: ASBPA
- Formation: 1926
- President: Gary Jones
- Website: http://www.asbpa.org

The American Shore and Beach Preservation Association (ASBPA) is a private, nonprofit organization formed in 1926. It was founded to address coastal erosion and the loss of sand on America's beaches. Today, ASBPA is an association of beach and coastal practitioners, including beach towns and managers, coastal engineers, coastal geologists, dredging and ecological restoration companies, coastal academics and students. ASBPA advances coastal science and coastal engineering through its peer-reviewed journal, Shore & Beach, and an annual technical conference. It also hosts an annual coastal summit in Washington, DC to advocate for coastal policies.

== History ==
ASBPA was founded in 1926, and was initially instrumental in persuading the Congress to enact legislation authorizing federal funding of erosion studies and project works for shore protection. In 1930, ASBPA helped form the Beach Erosion Board. ASBPA was politically engaged on coastal erosion and beach nourishment for most of the 20th century and has had number of prominent coastal advocates and members of the Army Corps of Engineers on its board, including Morrough Parker O'Brien, who served as President from 1972 to 1983.

After a long partnership, ASBPA merged with the American Coastal Coalition (ACC) in 2003. In 2015, ASBPA formed memorandum of understanding with the Coastal Zone Foundation (CZF) to collaborate on a certification program for coastal practitioners.

== Advocacy ==
ASBPA (and the ACC, which it merged with in 2003) has been the leading advocate for the United States Army Corps of Engineers shore protection program which builds and provides federal funding for beach and dunes systems as coastal flood protection for vulnerable communities. The focus on sand and sediment has led the organization to advocate for the beneficial use of dredged material and natural coastal infrastructure. In February 2017, ASBPA President Anthony P. Pratt was invited to testify before United States Senate Committee on Environment and Public Works on the value of beaches, dunes, wetlands and other natural coastal infrastructure to the nation. In 2019, ASBPA Executive Director, Derek Brockbank, testified before the United States House Committee on Transportation and Infrastructure and the Senate Environment and Public Works Committee, on issues related to beach and coastal restoration in the Water Resources Development Act

== Publications ==
Shore & Beach is a peer-reviewed journal, published by ASBPA four times per year. It includes scientific articles and general interest features. Typically, one issue per year is a special issue devoted to single subject. Shore & Beach has been published since 1933.

"Coastal Voice" is a member newsletter distributed by ASBPA eleven times per year. It includes coastal policy updates, science and technology updates, information on conferences and workshops, and changes to the board and staff of ASBPA.

== Best Restored Beach and Shore ==
ASBPA presents annual awards for Best Restored Beach to communities that have recently undergone nourishment or full restoration. And starting in 2019, ASBPA presents awards for Best Restored Shore to non-beach shorelines.

Inaugural 2019 Best Restored Shore winners were:

- Virginia Point Wetland Protection Project, Texas
- Mississippi River Long Distance Sediment Pipeline, Louisiana
- Money Point Shoreline Restoration, Virginia
- Mispillion Living Shoreline Project, Delaware

Recent Best Restored Beach winners have included:

2022 Winners

- Duxbury Beach Dune Restoration Project, MA
- Ocean Isle Beach Shoreline Protection Project, NC
- Sodus Point Beach Project, NY
- Waikiki Beach Maintenance Project, HI

2021 Winners

- Lido Key Hurricane and Storm Damage Reduction Project, Florida
- St. Joseph Peninsula Beach Renourishment Project, Florida
- Upham Beach Stabilization Project, Florida

2020 Winners

- Cardiff State Beach, California
- South Benson Marina/Jennings Beach, Connecticut
- Keansburg, New Jersey
- Norriego Point, Florida
- Tybee Island, Georgia

2019 Winners

- Caminada Headland, Louisiana
- South Padre Island, Texas
- Waypoint Park Beach, Bellingham, WA
- Duval County, Florida

2018 Winners

- Dare County, North Carolina Beaches, NC
- Galveston Seawall Beach, TX
- Cardiff Beach, Encinitas, CA
- Sagaponack-Bridgehampton Beaches, NY
- Thompsons Beach, NJ

2017 Winners

- Dauphin Island, AL
- Phipps Ocean Park, Palm Beach, FL
- Popponesset Spit, MA
- Prime Hook Beach, DE
- Sandbridge Beach, Virginia Beach, VA

2016 winners:

- Babe's Beach, Galveston, TX
- Rosewood Beach, Highland Park, IL
- Seabrook Island, SC
- Topsail Beach, NC
- Redondo Beach, CA.

2015 winners:

- Galveston Island, TX
- Santa Monica, CA
- Western Destin Beach, FL
- Folly Beach, SC
- South Hutchinson Island/St Lucie, FL

== Chapters ==
- California Shore & Beach Preservation Association - www.csbpa.org
- Central-East Coast chapter of ASBPA
- Central Gulf Coast chapter of ASBPA
- Hawaii Shore & Beach Preservation Association - www.hawaiishoreandbeach.org
- Great Lakes Shore & Beach Preservation Association
- Northeast Shore & Beach Preservation Association - www.nsbpa.org
- Student Chapter of ASBPA at Stevens Institute of Technology - http://gradlife.stevens.edu/org/stevensasbpa
- Texas chapter of ASBPA - www.texasasbpa.org
