= USC&GS Marinduque =

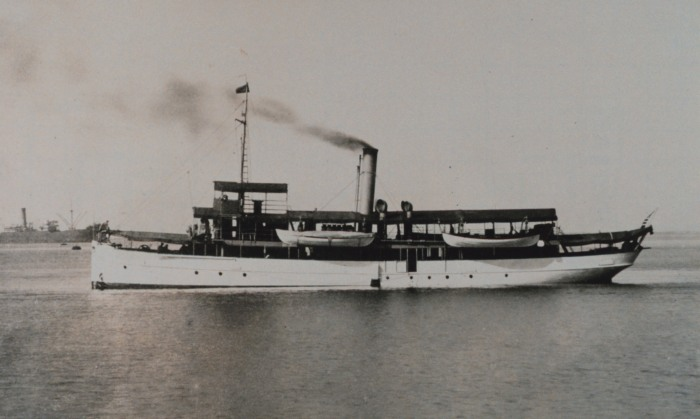
- USC&GS Marinduque in the Philippine Islands.

History

United States
- Name: Marinduque
- Namesake: The island of Marinduque in the Philippine Islands
- Owner: Philippine Insular Government
- Operator: Philippine Bureau of Coast Guard and Transportation; U.S. Coast and Geodetic Survey/Philippine Insular Government
- Cost: $67,673.42 (USD)
- Laid down: probably 1902
- Launched: probably 1902 (Note: See discussion of discrepancies in text.)
- Completed: Delivered Manila 18 April 1903
- Acquired: by Coast & Geodetic Survey November 1, 1905
- Commissioned: 1905
- Decommissioned: September 20, 1932
- Identification: Signal: MCLF

General characteristics
- Type: Survey ship
- Tonnage: 411 GRT
- Displacement: 345 tons
- Length: 132 ft (40.2 m) Registered
- Beam: 23 ft (7.0 m)
- Draft: 10.2 ft (3.1 m)
- Propulsion: Steam engine, 2 screws
- Speed: 8 kn (9.2 mph; 15 km/h)
- Complement: 9 officers, 37 men

USC&GS Marinduque was a steamer, owned by the Philippine Insular Government, that served exclusively in the Philippines. The ship was purchased by the Philippine Bureau of Coast Guard and Transportation to support both government logistical and administrative travel needs as well as the usual functions of a coast guard vessel. The vessel was transferred to the United States Coast and Geodetic Survey serving as a survey ship from 1905 to 1932. Marinduque and Romblon were sister ships, both built in Japan.

== Acquisition ==
The Philippine Bureau of Coast Guard and Transportation shortly after creation 17 October 1901 and organizing with Captain A. Marix, USN, in charge had ten 148 ft (45.1 m) single screw cutters under contract at Farnham, Boyd & Company, Shanghai, China and five twin screw cutters contracted at Uraga Dock Company, Uraga, Japan. All vessels were to have both passenger and cargo capability as one purpose was to have official communication between isolated parts of the islands and administrative centers. They were to be steel framed with teak hull with copper sheathing with accommodation for about twelve passengers and 150 tons of cargo. Those for the vessels constructed at Uraga Dock Company were for length overall 140 ft (42.7 m), 23 ft (7.0 m) breadth, and a maximum draft of 8 ft (2.4 m) with a speed of 10 kn (12 mph; 19 km/h). (Note: The required length of 140 ft (42.7 m) and length given in registry and NOAA sources of 132 ft (40.2 m) most likely reflects that the registry length is slightly less than overall length. Cited documents do not give a final measurement of length overall as delivered.) Marinduque was built at a cost of $67,673.42,

The cutters delivered by Farnham, Boyd & Company were satisfactory, meeting requirements. Romblon, arriving in Manila on 19 January 1903, and Marinduque that arrived 18 April 1903 were did not meet specifications. Romblon had been accepted by the agent in Japan, later dismissed for neglect of duty, but was found on delivery to have a draft exceeding maximum by 1 ft (0.3 m) to 1.5 ft (0.5 m) and when loaded with coal, water and ready for sea was down by the bow. Further, the "material and workmanship on hull, boilers, and engine were very poor" as well as the vessel not meeting speed and sea keeping requirements. Some corrections were made on Marinduque but on delivery the same poor workmanship and material quality was present along with some uncorrectable deficiencies. As a result, and negotiations with a director of the builder summoned to Manila, a settlement was reached to cancel the remaining three ships but with a loss of about $30,000 to the government.

There is a discrepancy in the build date for the ships with the normally authoritative register having a 1901 date and it is probably that date used in the USC&GS dates of later years. It is obvious from the fact the organization that ordered the vessels, the Bureau of Coast Guard and Transportation, only formed on 17 October 1901 and the delivery dates are January and April of 1903 that a 1901 date is not reasonable. It is possible that is the contract date and the vessels were under construction in 1902 as the three hulls cancelled were still incomplete when the problems with the Uraga construction became evident.

== Service with Philippine Coast Guard ==
There is little record of service details. The cutters were commanded by American or European officers with Filipino petty officers and crewmen. The system was set so that vessels served particular routes serving communication and transportation functions with duties of coast guard in patrol and other typical duties of such a service being accomplished within that service. All vessels were lightly armed. They also acted as transports for both troops and law enforcement when necessary.

== Transfer to Coast and Geodetic Survey ==
Marinduque was transferred from the Philippine Commission to the Coast and Geodetic Survey for Philippine survey work on November 1, 1905. For operations in the Philippines the U.S. Government paid salaries, cost of travel to and from the Philippines and expenses for the U.S. Coast and Geodetic Survey officers aboard the ships. The insular government paid crew salaries and expenses as well as having ownership of the vessels excepting the Pathfinder. All crews were Filipino.

=== Service history ===
Marinduque left Manila December 10, 1905 for her initial surveys on the west coast of Leyte between "Illongas" (Note: Period spelling used.) and "Polompon", then after a period in Manila April 10–23, 1906, the east coast of Luzon between Atimonan and Polillo island.

The work around Polillo island was in progress until October 10, 1908 when weather required suspension and return to Manila with the position of Ocata Island light house established. Seven typhoons had passed over the region and destruction of survey navigation marks was noted. After repairs at Manila the ship sailed January 25, 1909 for the south coast of Mindanao. at the request of military authorities due to open hostilities in the area. A detachment of twenty-two Philippine Scouts was taken aboard at Fort Margosatubig on January 30, 1909 and shore parties for the survey in the densely forested coast were armed and under armed escort during triangulation and topographic surveys of the shoreline. P. E. Angell, one of Marinduque's mates, drowned while attempting to reach a small boat anchored off Sigayan Point in Illana Bay on the south coast of Mindanao.

On more than one occasion, Marinduque had occasion to assist mariners in distress. On 21 October 1916, she came to the aid the schooner Florence, which was in distress with her sails blown away, part of her rigging gone, and her food and water low; Marinduque towed Florence to Coron on Palawan and then took Florence's captain from Coron to Manila on Luzon. On 7 July 1927, she helped the British steamer Paipeng, which was aground on Cap Island in the Philippines; Marinduque took off the majority of Paipeng's passengers and transported them to Jolo.

The ship was transferred to the Insular Bureau of Labor March 19, 1918 and alterations made for use as an inter-island cargo ship with its condition on return to the Coast and Geodetic Survey July 7, 1919 requiring work restoring the ship to seaworthy condition and suitability for surveys until September 26, 1919. During 1920, due to the Navy's discontinuing coaling of the C&GS ships, work took place convenient to an offer of coal by the governor of Mindanao and coal mines at Sandakan, Borneo where Marinduque surveyed in company with Pathfinder on the west coast of Mindanao, the Sulu Sea and Palawan closest to the coaling station at Sandakan. Much of Marinduque's work involved establishing the a triangulation network on the west coast of Mindanao on the Zamboanga Peninsula for survey navigation.

Marinduque, in Manila and just after extensive repairs, was fouled by another ship that broke from moorings during a typhoon that hit the city August 31, 1920 and sustained considerable damage while Romblon lost a whaleboat and the Manila tide station was demolished. Marinduque was inactive July 1, 1920 through March 15, 1921 with Romblon inactive the entire fiscal year due to inability to furnish C&GS officers for the ships and full reports only cover Pathfinder and Fathomer as actively surveying. From March 16 through May 13 Marinduque worked Bacoor Bay, Cavite and from May 24 through June 30 in Albay Gulf and Lagonoy Gulf.

== Fate ==
Marinduque completed operations in the Sulu Archipelago August 31, 1932 and returned to Manila where the ship was decommissioned September 20, 1932 then sold by the Philippine Government.

== External photos ==
- Ken Crosby on the Marinduque (1924 photo).
- A good place for crocodiles and snakes. Boat off the Marinduque in a jungle stream. (1925)
- Operating the mechanical sounding engine on the Marinduque. (1925)
