= USS Pathfinder (AGS-1) =

Survey vessel for the United States Navy

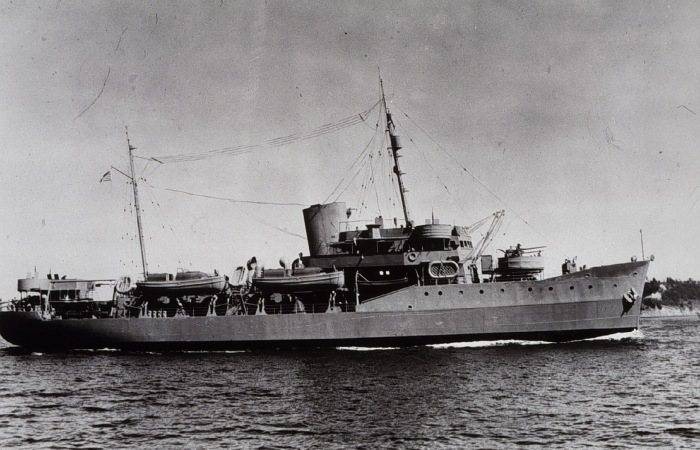
- USC&GS Pathfinder was commissioned as a U.S. Navy vessel during World War II.

History

United States
- Name: USC&GSS Pathfinder
- Namesake: USC&GSS Pathfinder (1899–1941)
- Builder: Lake Washington Shipyard, Houghton, Washington
- Laid down: 20 February 1941 for U.S. Coast and Geodetic Survey
- Launched: 11 January 1942, christened by Eleanor Roosevelt Boettinger
- Completed: 31 August 1942
- Acquired: 31 August 1942 as USS Pathfinder (AGS-1)
- Commissioned: 31 August 1942
- Decommissioned: 31 January 1946
- Stricken: 13 November 1946
- Honors and awards: 2 battle stars, World War II
- Fate: Returned to the U.S. Coast and Geodetic Survey, 1 October 1946. Served as USC&GSS Pathfinder (OSS 30) until Deactivated 23 December 1971. Scrapped at General Auto Wrecking Co. of Ballard, Washington in 1972.

General characteristics
- Displacement: 2,175 t
- Length: 229 ft 4 in (69.90 m)
- Beam: 39 ft (12 m)
- Draft: 16 ft (4.9 m)
- Speed: 14 knots (26 km/h)
- Complement: 158
- Armament: 2 × 3 in (76 mm)/50 guns; 2 × depth charge tracks; 2 × depth charge projectors

USS Pathfinder (AGS-1) was a survey vessel for the United States Navy during World War II. Before and after the war she was USC&GSS Pathfinder (OSS-30) for the United States Coast and Geodetic Survey, named after the USC&GSS Pathfinder (1899–1941) that had surveyed and was lost in the Philippines at Corregidor. Pathfinder ended her service 23 December 1971 as she and the Coast and Geodetic Survey itself had come the National Ocean Survey under the National Oceanic and Atmospheric Administration (NOAA).

== Construction ==
Pathfinder was built by the Lake Washington Shipyard of Houghton, Washington with her keel laid 20 February 1941, christened by Eleanor Roosevelt Boettinger, granddaughter of the president, launched 11 January 1942 and completed 31 August 1942 with armament as a request by Navy as the ship's transfer had been approved by Department of Commerce before completion. The ship had been completed at a cost of $1,265,448 which was slightly under estimated costs. She was acquired by the U.S. Navy and commissioned 31 August 1942.

== U.S. Navy service ==
A sea-going arm of the U.S. Navy's Hydrographic Office, Pathfinder spent the war years paving the way for amphibious invasion.

After shakedown in the Puget Sound area of Washington and a stop at San Francisco, Pathfinder got under way 10 November 1942 and proceeded via Pearl Harbor and Palmyra Island to the Ellice Islands arriving Funa Futi 26 December.

For nearly two years Pathfinder operated along the dangerous New Guinea-New Britain-Solomon Islands areas as allied land-air-sea forces fought to break the Japanese grip on the area. An isolated reef, an uncharted harbor, a lonely stretch of enemy held coastline—each presented a different problem. At Bougainville, Treasury Island, Green Island, Emirau and Guam, advance Pathfinder parties were sent ashore under the noses of the Japanese to work in close cooperation with Allied amphibious elements in laying out harbor charts or surveying inland channels.

During most of 1943, the ship operated in the Solomons and neighboring groups; the Russell Islands, Admiralties, Loyalties, and New Caledonia. Pathfinder, although nominally a noncombatant, experienced some fifty bombing raids while working close to the front lines. She showed that she could retaliate at Guadalcanal 7 April 1943 when her antiaircraft gunners shot down two Japanese planes.

At the end of September 1944, after some three months of scientific probing around New Guinea, Pathfinder departed for Espiritu Santo, with written commendations from Admirals Nimitz, Kinkaid, and Halsey. She reached Pearl Harbor 11 October and Alameda, California, 21 October.

The proud veteran headed back toward the war zone 18 December 1944. By this time the tide of battle had swept northward to the Philippines. She reached Guam 4 February to prepare for landings at Casiguran Bay, Luzon 13 March 1945. This first on the eastern coast of Luzon greatly helped to liberate the Philippines. On 28 March two enemy aircraft attacked the ship but she escaped damage.

On 1 May 1945, one month after the initial beachhead was established on Okinawa, Pathfinder churned into Hagushi Anchorage. On 6 May 1945 at "Suicide Slot", Sesoko, a Japanese kamikaze plane crash-dived into the veteran survey ship's after gun platform killing one man, starting fires and setting off ready ammunition. Emergency parties quickly brought the flames under control.

Between her arrival at Okinawa and the final cessation of hostilities 15 August, the ship was at general quarters 170 times.

Pathfinder anchored at Yokosuka Naval Base, Tokyo Bay, 13 October 1945 and wound up her U.S. Naval career with a series of surveys among the Empire's home islands to assist the Allied occupation.

Pathfinder departed Yokosuka, Japan, 5 December 1945. Touching at Pearl Harbor 16 December, the ship arrived Seattle, Washington, 24 December, she decommissioned 31 January 1946, and was transferred to the Commerce Department on 22 August. On 1 October 1946 Pathfinder was returned to the United States Coast and Geodetic Survey. She was struck from the Navy List 13 November 1946.

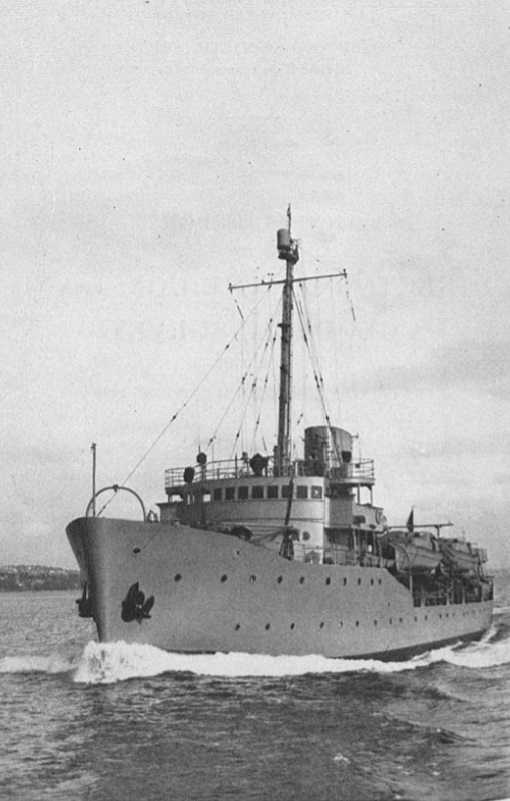
USC&GS Pathfinder (OSS 30) departing Seattle, Washington, sometime between 1946 and 1950.

== Honors and awards ==
Pathfinder received two battle stars for World War II service.
