= USC&GS Hydrographer (1901) =

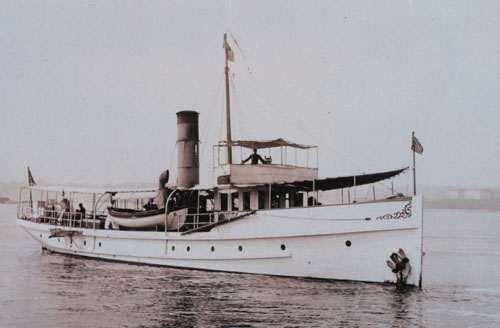
- USC&GS Hydrographer

History

United States
- Name: Hydrographer
- Namesake: Hydrographer, a practitioner of hydrography, the measurement of physical characteristics of waters and marginal land
- Builder: James Reilly Supply Company, Port Jefferson, New York
- Completed: 1901
- In service: 1901
- Out of service: 1917
- In service: 1 April 1919
- Out of service: 1928
- Notes: Served as United States Navy patrol vessel USS Hydrographer 1917-1919

General characteristics
- Type: Survey launch
- Displacement: 146 tons
- Length: 101 ft (31 m)
- Beam: 19.5 ft (5.9 m)
- Draft: 6.8 ft (2.1 m)
- Speed: 10 knots

The first USC&GS Hydrographer was a survey launch that served in the United States Coast and Geodetic Survey from 1901 to 1917 and from 1919 to 1928.

== Construction and acquisition ==
Hydrographer was built by the James Reilly Supply Company at Port Jefferson on Long Island, New York, in 1901, and entered service with the Coast and Geodetic Survey the same year.

== Coast and Geodetic Survey service, 1901-1917 ==
Hydrographer operated along the United States East Coast. In August 1912, she pulled the schooner Estrella off of a mud flat on which Estrella had grounded. On 8 February 1914, she assisted the United States Navy torpedo boat USS Foote (Torpedo Boat No. 3) off of a shoal in Pamlico Sound, North Carolina, then provided Foote with a navigator to assist her in transiting the sound and proceeding from Elizabeth City to Washington, North Carolina.

== U.S. Navy service, 1917-1919 ==
In 1917, Hydrographer was transferred to the United States Navy for World War I service as the survey and patrol vessel USS Hydrographer.

== Coast and Geodetic Survey service, 1919-1928 ==
Transferred back to the Survey postwar on 1 April 1919, she resumed her East Coast duties. She was blown aground on 9 September 1919 during the 1919 Florida Keys Hurricane, but the actions of shipmate O. M. Straub saved her from significant damage.

On 16 February 1922, Hydrographer towed the gasoline-powered launch Edna G, which had been disabled in heavy seas, into port at Gulfport, Mississippi. She went to the assistance of the schooner W. J. Patterson, which was on fire off Sabine Pass, Texas, on 22 June 1923; her crew fought the fire for over three hours and she supplied a hose crew for the steamer S.S. Hudson, which also was assisting W. J. Patterson.

In May 1927, officers and crewmen of Hydrographer were detailed to Memphis, Tennessee, to assist victims of the 1927 Mississippi River flood.

Hydrographer was retired from Coast and Geodetic Survey service in 1928.
