= USC&GS Romblon =

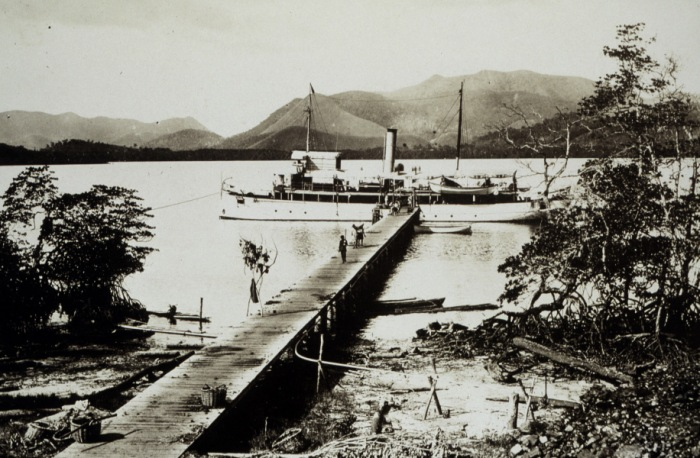
- USC&GS Romblon in the Philippine Islands at a coal pier her crew built

History

United States
- Name: USC&GS Romblon
- Namesake: Romblon, an island in the Philippine Islands
- Owner: Philippine Insular Government
- Operator: Philippine Bureau of Coast Guard and Transportation; U.S. Coast and Geodetic Survey/Philippine Insular Government
- Builder: Uraga Dock Company, Uraga, Japan
- Laid down: probably 1902
- Launched: probably 1902 (Note: See discussion of discrepancies in text.)
- Completed: Delivered Manila 19 January 1903
- Acquired: November 1, 1905
- Commissioned: 1905
- Decommissioned: 1921
- Identification: Signal: MCLT

General characteristics
- Type: Survey ship
- Tonnage: 411 GRT
- Displacement: 345 tons
- Length: 132 ft (40.2 m) Registered
- Beam: 23 ft (7.0 m)
- Draft: 10.2 ft (3.1 m)
- Propulsion: Steam engine, 2 screws
- Speed: 8 kn (9.2 mph; 15 km/h)
- Complement: 9 officers, 37 men

USC&GS Romblon was a steamer, owned by the Philippine Insular Government, that served exclusively in the Philippines. The ship was purchased by the Philippine Bureau of Coast Guard and Transportation to support both government logistical and administrative travel needs as well as the usual functions of a coast guard vessel. The vessel was transferred to the United States Coast and Geodetic Survey serving as a survey ship from 1905 to 1932. Romblon and Marinduque were sister ships, both built in Japan.

== Acquisition ==
The Philippine Bureau of Coast Guard and Transportation shortly after creation 17 October 1901 and organizing with Captain A. Marix, USN, in charge had ten 148 ft (45.1 m) single screw cutters under contract at Farnham, Boyd & Company, Shanghai, China and five twin screw cutters contracted at Uraga Dock Company, Uraga, Japan. All vessels were to have both passenger and cargo capability as one purpose was to have official communication between isolated parts of the islands and administrative centers. They were to be steel framed with teak hull with copper sheathing with accommodation for about twelve passengers and 150 tons of cargo. Those for the vessels constructed at Uraga Dock Company were for length overall 140 ft (42.7 m), 23 ft (7.0 m) breadth, and a maximum draft of 8 ft (2.4 m) with a speed of 10 kn (12 mph; 19 km/h). (Note: The required length of 140 ft (42.7 m) and length given in registry and NOAA sources of 132 ft (40.2 m) most likely reflects that the registry length is slightly less than overall length. Cited documents do not give a final measurement of length overall as delivered.)

The cutters delivered by Farnham, Boyd & Company were satisfactory, meeting requirements. Romblon, arriving in Manila on 19 January 1903, and Marinduque that arrived 18 April 1903 were did not meet specifications. Romblon had been accepted by the agent in Japan, later dismissed for neglect of duty, but was found on delivery to have a draft exceeding maximum by 1 ft (0.3 m) to 1.5 ft (0.5 m) and when loaded with coal, water and ready for sea was down by the bow. Further, the "material and workmanship on hull, boilers, and engine were very poor" as well as the vessel not meeting speed and sea keeping requirements. Some corrections were made on Marinduque but on delivery the same poor workmanship and material quality was present along with some uncorrectable deficiencies. As a result, and negotiations with a director of the builder summoned to Manila, a settlement was reached to cancel the remaining three ships but with a loss of about $30,000 to the government.

There is a discrepancy in the build date for the ships with the normally authoritative register having a 1901 date and it is probably that date used in the USC&GS dates of later years. It is obvious from the fact the organization that ordered the vessels, the Bureau of Coast Guard and Transportation, only formed on 17 October 1901 and the delivery dates are January and April of 1903 that a 1901 date is not reasonable. It is possible that is the contract date and the vessels were under construction in 1902 as the three hulls cancelled were still incomplete when the problems with the Uraga construction became evident.

== Service with Philippine Coast Guard ==
There is little record of service details. The cutters were commanded by American or European officers with Filipino petty officers and crewmen. The system was set so that vessels served particular routes serving communication and transportation functions with duties of coast guard in patrol and other typical duties of such a service being accomplished within that service. All vessels were lightly armed. They also acted as transports for both troops and law enforcement when necessary.

== Transfer to Coast and Geodetic Survey ==
Romblon was transferred from the Philippine Commission to the Coast and Geodetic Survey for Philippine survey work on November 1, 1905. For operations in the Philippines the U.S. Government paid salaries, cost of travel to and from the Philippines and expenses for the U.S. Coast and Geodetic Survey officers aboard the ships. The insular government paid crew salaries and expenses as well as having ownership of the vessels excepting the Pathfinder. All crews were Filipino.

=== Service history ===
On December 14, 1905, the ship departed Manila for work on the west coast of Luzon off Zambales province and, after a period back in Manila from April 14 through May 1, 1906, on the east coast of Luzon between Daet and Sogod.

In 1913, tragedy struck Romblon when a seaman from her crew died on Culion Island in the Calamianes Islands in Palawan Province. The man was believed to have been murdered by Tagbanuas tribesmen.

On more than once occasion, Romblon rendered assistance to mariners in distress. On 3 December 1916, Romblon searched for two men who had been blown offshore in a banca attempting to cross from Cuyo Island to Biscuay Island. She found them on Capnoyan Island, rescued them, and returned them to their homes on Cuyo Island. On 12 October 1918 she towed the disabled steamship SS Palawan from off the entrance to Manila Bay to Manila Harbor at Manila on Luzon.

Romblon was in Manila preparing to sail on October 25, 1918, when the city and vessel were hit by the influenza pandemic initially infecting fifteen of the crew and then spreading to all. Meanwhile, on November 8, Pathfinder at Puerto Princesa, Palawan had been stricken by a much more fatal epidemic infecting all and killing eight. By transfer of well crew from Fathomer the Romblon was able to go to the assistance of Pathfinder arriving November 14. On November 16 Romblon transferred five men from engineering to Pathfinder allowing that ship to get underway for Manila and hospitalization. At the request of the provincial governor the ship transported medical supplies to Brooke's Point.

Romblon was in Manila during a typhoon that hit the city August 31, 1920, losing a whaleboat while Marinduque, which had just completed extensive repairs, was damaged by another ship that broke from moorings causing considerable damage, and the Manila tide station was demolished. Romblon was apparently inactive July 1, 1920, through June 30, 1921, as "only two vessels were engaged in surveying work during this period" due to inability to furnish C&GS officers for the other ships and full reports only covering Pathfinder and Fathomer with Marinduque shown working March 15 – June 30, 1921.

== Fate ==
Romblon was retired from service in 1921.
