= Beach Erosion Board =

The Beach Erosion Board (BEB) was a federal board organized under the US Government's War Department (later, the Department of Defense), U.S. Army, and was a part of the civil works program of the United States Army Corps of Engineers. The Board had seven members and a large staff. The life of the BEB spanned a period of 33 years, beginning with its establishment in July 1930. The BEB was abolished in November 1963.

The functions of the BEB pertained to review of reports of investigations made concerning erosion of the shores of coastal and lake waters, and the protection of those shores. Under its implementing legislation, Section 2 of Public Law 520, 7lst Congress, approved on July 3, 1930, the Chief of Engineers, U.S. Army, was given authority to make, in cooperation with the appropriate agencies of the various coastal States, investigations and studies aimed at devising effective means of presenting erosion of the shores of coastal and lake waters by waves and currents. The funding provision for these investigations and studies was that no money should be expended under authority of the Act in any State which did not provide for cooperation with the agencies of the United States and contribute to the project such funds and/or services as the Secretary of War deemed appropriate and required.

Beginning during World War II, the BEB produced, maintained, and disseminated intelligence concerning potential landing beaches of interest to the US armed forces. The BEB continued to perform that function for the US armed forces for nearly 20 years. In late 1962, the International Division which handled the intelligence function was transferred to the newly created US Army Area Analysis Intelligence Agency (AAIA). The organization and resources of the AAIA is described in detail in the "Area Analysis Plan", which is available in the National Archives.

In 1963, certain of the BEB’s functions were transferred to the newly created US Army Coastal Engineering Research Center, while others were transferred to the Board of Engineers for Rivers and Harbors. Pursuant to the federal Water Resources Development Act of 1992, the duties and responsibilities of the Board of Engineers for Rivers and Harbors subsequently were transferred by the Secretary of the Army to other elements within the Department of the Army as the Secretary determined to be necessary.

== Sources ==
- "The History of the Beach Erosion Board, U.S. Army, Corps of Engineers, 1930-63," by Mary-Louise Quinn, Miscellaneous Report No. 77-9, August 1977
