= USS Elsie III =

Patrol vessel of the United States Navy

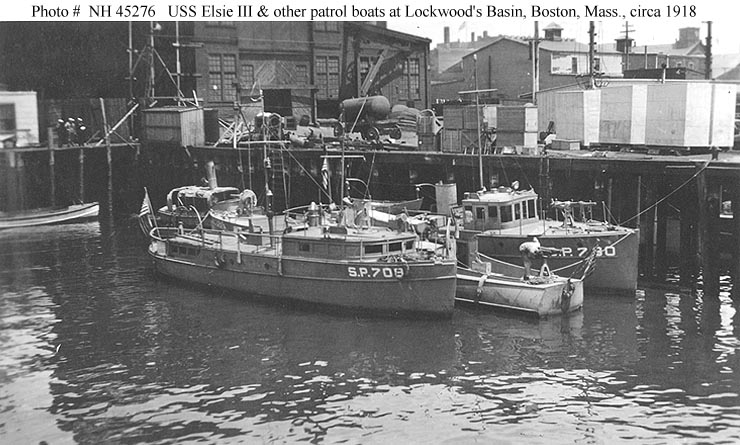
- USS Elsie III (foreground) at Lockwood's Basin in Boston, Massachusetts, during World War I. Behind her is the patrol vessel USS Lynx II (SP-730).

History

United States
- Name: USS Elsie III (SP-708)
- Namesake: Previous name retained
- Completed: 1912
- Acquired: 1917
- Commissioned: 30 June 1917
- Fate: Transferred to United States Coast and Geodetic Survey 21 April 1919
- Notes: Operated as civilian motorboat Elsie III 1912-1917

United States
- Name: USC&GS Elsie III
- Namesake: Previous name retained
- Acquired: 21 April 1919
- Decommissioned: 1944

General characteristics (patrol vessel)
- Type: Patrol vessel
- Tonnage: 23 tons
- Length: 52 ft (16 m)
- Beam: 11 ft 6 in (3.51 m)
- Draft: 4 ft (1.2 m)
- Propulsion: Gasoline engine
- Complement: 10
- Armament: None

USS Elsie III (SP-708) was a United States Navy patrol vessel in commission from 1917 to 1919 that saw service during World War I. After the completion of her U.S. Navy career, she was in commission in the United States Coast and Geodetic Survey as the survey launch USC&GS Elsie III from 1919 to 1944.

== Construction and commissioning ==
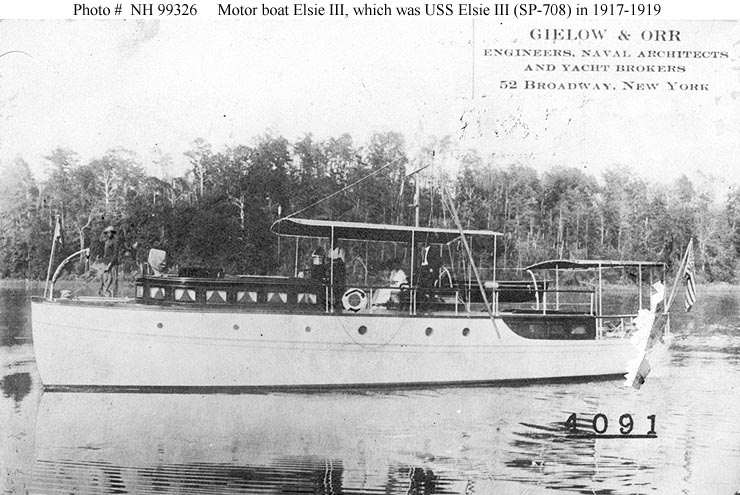
Elsie III as a civilian motorboat sometime between 1912 and 1917, prior to her U.S. Navy service.

Elsie III was built as a civilian motorboat of the same name in 1912 at Morris Heights in the Bronx, New York. The U.S. Navy purchased her from her owner in 1917 for World War I service as a patrol vessel. She was commissioned on 30 June 1917 as USS Elsie III (SP-708).

== United States Navy service ==
Assigned to the 1st Naval District for section patrol duties and based at Boston, Massachusetts, Elsie III operated in the vicinity of Boston for the rest of World War I on patrol, despatch, guard, towing, and transport duties.

== United States Coast and Geodetic Survey service ==
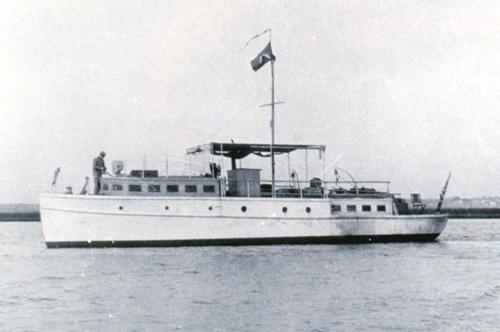
USC&GS Elsie III on Lake Okeechobee in Florida, ca. 1924..

The U.S. Navy transferred Elsie III to the U.S. Coast and Geodetic Survey on 21 April 1919. Commissioned into the Survey as the survey launch USC&GS Elsie III, she served along the United States East Coast during her career with the Survey.

Between 4 September and 12 September 1935, Elsie III joined the Coast and Geodetic Survey launch USC&GS Marindin in helping with relief efforts in the Florida Keys following the passage of the violent 1935 Labor Day hurricane.

The Coast and Geodetic Survey retired Elsie III from service in 1944.
