= USC&GS Fathomer (1904) =

American geodetic survey ship (1905–1942)

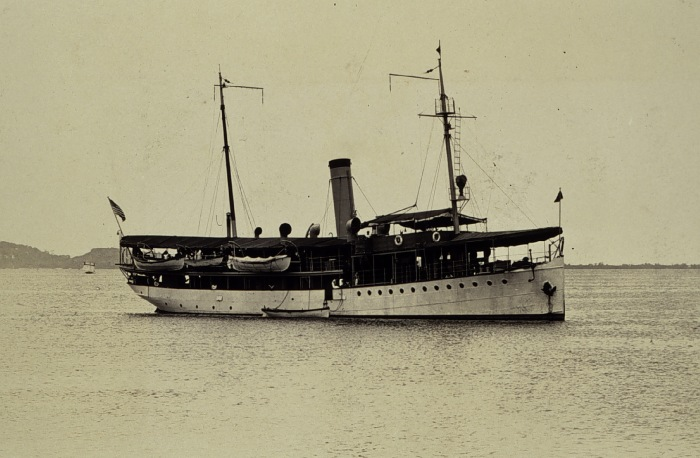
- USC&GS Fathomer in 1927

History

United States
- Name: Fathomer
- Namesake: One who fathoms, i.e., measures the depth of or takes a sounding of, a body of water
- Owner: Insular Government of the Philippine Islands
- Operator: U.S. Coast and Geodetic Survey/Insular Government of the Philippine Islands
- Builder: Hong Kong and Whampoa Dock Company, Hong Kong
- Completed: 1904
- Commissioned: 1905
- Fate: Lost April 1942
- Notes: Call sign: GVWK

General characteristics
- Type: Survey ship
- Length: 152 ft (46 m)
- Beam: 25 ft (7.6 m)
- Draft: 9.4 ft (2.9 m)
- Propulsion: Steam engine
- Speed: 10.5 knots

The second USC&GS Fathomer was a steamer that served as a survey ship in the United States Coast and Geodetic Survey from 1905 to 1942.

== Construction and acquisition ==
Fathomer was built by the Hong Kong and Whampoa Dock Company at Hong Kong in 1904 under the supervision of C. C. Yates for the Survey. On 10 December 1904 she underwent trials in Hong Kong witnessed by a special board composed of C&GS personnel and others acting for the Coast and Geodetic Survey, passing her speed trial at 10.5 knots—0.5 knots more than required. The board recommended acceptance after certain changes and additions by the contractor. The ship was delivered by the contractor in Manila Bay on 19 January 1905 and was immediately placed in commission with the U.S. Coast and Geodetic Survey. (Note: The NOAA reference mentions "Orchid, Coast Guard lighthouse tender" that appears erroneous as made very clear in the 1905 Annual Report showing construction under supervision of C&GS with a special C&GS party to witness trials in Hong Kong followed by delivery to and commissioning by C&GS in Manila 19 January 1905. Dictionary of American Naval Fighting Ships has an entry for a ship of that name built in 1908 that was transferred to the Philippines in 1945.)

== Funding and crews ==
For operations in the Philippines the U.S. Government paid salaries, cost of travel to and from the Philippines and expenses for the U.S. Coast and Geodetic Survey officers aboard the ships. The insular government paid crew salaries and expenses as well as having ownership of the vessels excepting the Pathfinder. All crews were Filipino.

== Operational history ==
Fathomer spent her career in the Philippine Islands. In late July 1918, the majority of her crew became ill with influenza during the 1918 pandemic, with only two men capable of muster on deck at one point. Returning from coaling at Sandakan, Borneo the ship ran aground on 25 October 1918 at North Tubbataha Reef, the third of three vessels to ground in three years and the only one getting off without assistance.

On 9–10 December 1929, (Note: The NOAA History Web site (at http://www.history.noaa.gov/hallofhonor/lifesaving1845-1937.html) states that this took place in December 1930, but cites a Coast and Geodetic Survey Bulletin article of 9 January 1930 as reporting the incident. One of the dates must be a typographical error, and it appears from the placement of the incident in the timeline and the date of the referenced article that 1929 is the correct year, but it is possible that this incident occurred in December 1930.) Fathomer rescued 45 men of the Japanese vessel Kenkyu Maru on the west coast of Palawan. On 17 October 1931, (Note: The NOAA History site reports that this event took place on 17 October 1928 (at http://www.history.noaa.gov/hallofhonor/lineofduty.html#fathomer) and on 11 October 1931 (at http://www.history.noaa.gov/stories_tales/fathomer.html), but the original article of December 1931 on the incident (at http://www.history.noaa.gov/stories_tales/fathomer.html) clearly states that the incident occurred on 17 October 1931.) she lost three seamen from her crew—part of a signal-building crew working on the west coast of Palawan—when their skiff foundered in a sudden squall while attempting to return to the ship from shore. On 29 October 1933, she pulled the Philippino Cutch Corporation ship Baynain off a reef near Arrecife Island off Palawan.

=== 15 August 1936 Typhoon ===
During her years of service in the Philippines, Fathomer rode out many typhoons, but her most famous survival story was during a typhoon which struck in August 1936 while she was under the command of Robert Francis Anthony Studds, a future Director of the U.S. Coast and Geodetic Survey. With only a few days left to conclude the season's work on northeast Luzon, she was forced on 9 August 1936 to suspend hydrographic survey operations and seek shelter in Port San Vicente as a typhoon approached the area; it passed about 50 nautical miles (93 km) from Fathomer's position on 11 August. On 12 August she attempted to return to the survey working grounds, but confused seas and a heavy swell compelled her to return to Port San Vicente. Plans to depart again on 13 August were cancelled when another typhoon approached. By 14 August it was apparent from the typhoon's track that it would strike Port San Vicente. That afternoon, Fathomer's crew prepared to ride out the storm, securing her gear and anchoring her in the inner harbor.

Rain squalls associated with the typhoon arrived at Port San Vicente at about 0600 hours on 15 August 1936, and Fathomer began sending frequent weather reports to Manila. The weather deteriorated throughout the day, and winds reached 90 miles per hour (145 kilometers per hour) by 1730 hours; by 1905 hours winds were estimated to have reached 120 to 150 miles (193 to 242 kilometers) per hour and were creating waves six feet (1.8 meters) high even in the virtually landlocked inner harbor, so Fathomer began to operate her engines first at half-speed ahead and then at full speed ahead to try to keep from drifting. However, one of her anchor cables parted, and the wind and seas forced her aground on a reef at about 1925 hours, after which the wind forced her to list heavily to starboard.

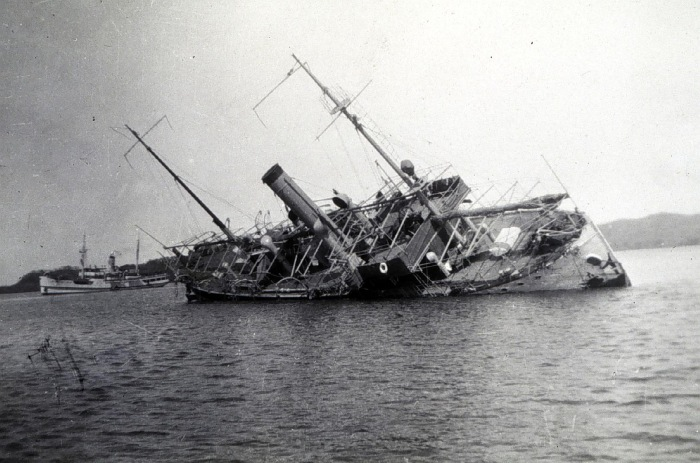
Fathomer aground in the inner harbor at Port San Vicente, Luzon, in the Philippine Islands, after the typhoon of 15 August 1936. The size of the waves in the inner harbor can be estimated by the height of Fathomer's port side above the water; at the height of the typhoon, waves broke over her crewmen as they sheltered there.

The typhoon's eye passed over Fathomer from 2015 to 2035 hours, allowing her crew to make some repairs and send a distress signal to Manila, but the extremely high winds had returned by 2040 hours. The wind forced the ship's bow around to the southwest. She listed to starboard so far that her boat deck rail was underwater. The galley range and rice boiler broke loose and tore off a ventilator to the forecastle, causing the forecastle to flood, and the engine room and boiler room also became flooded when the engine room house's starboard side became submerged. The ship's generator failed at 2100 hours, leaving her in darkness, and the radio house had to be abandoned when it threatened to tear loose from the ship. The crew took shelter along the port alleyway, well above the water's surface, but waves increased in height significantly and broke over the men despite their height above the water.

The wind and waves began to moderate at about 2200 hours, and by 2230 Fathomer's crew—all of whom survived the ordeal—could begin to work on deck again. After daybreak on 16 August 1936, repairs began in earnest, and some crew members went ashore to establish a camp and render assistance to local Filipinos. At 1300 hours, the radio was repaired and Fathomer sent an SOS; the British steamer SS City of Florence immediately answered and relayed messages between Fathomer and Manila until City of Florence had moved out of range. In response to the messages, the United States Lighthouse Service lighthouse tender USLHT Canlaon departed Manila on 18 August to assist Fathomer, stopping at Aparri on 20 August to take the derrick dredge Aparri under tow.

Canlaon and Aparri reached Port San Vicente at 1400 hours on 20 August, and salvage operations began immediately. Fathomer was made watertight, the reef was dynamited, and Aparri dredged loose material to free Fathomer. At 0215 hours on 29 August, Fathomer was off the reef and afloat. Camp was struck at daybreak on 29 August; Canlaon left Port San Vicente at 1250 hours on 30 August with Fathomer in tow, and the ships arrived at Manila at 1500 hours on 1 September 1936.

Examination of data later suggested that Fathomer's barometric pressure reading at the height of the typhoon, 26.77 inches (680 millimeters) of mercury, was probably the lowest pressure ever recorded in the Philippine Islands up to that time.

Studds wrote a vivid account of Fathomer's experience in the typhoon that appeared as an article in the December 1936 edition of the U.S. oast and Geodetic Survey Field Engineers Bulletin. He gave credit to the officers and men of Fathomer for the ship's survival and the successful salvaging of the ship, but Coast and Geodetic Survey officials credited his oversight of the crew in maintaining the ship and her equipment for her survival of the powerful typhoon.

== Loss of Fathomer, 1942 and 1944 ==
Repaired and returned to service after the 1936 typhoon, Fathomer resumed her survey duties in the Philippine Islands. When Japan invaded the Philippines in December 1941 during World War II, defending American and Filipino forces fell back to the Bataan Peninsula. Fathomer fell back with them and supported their operations in the Bataan campaign with the remaining ships of the Asiatic Fleet until she was lost upon the fall of Bataan to the Japanese in April 1942. salvaged by the Japanese, the ship was renamed Omi Maru and was used as a local transport in the Philippines. The ship was bombed and badly damaged on 9 September 1944 by F6F Hellcat fighters of TF-38 in Macajalar Bay, near Iligan Bay, approximate position 08.30N 124.23E. Later that day the badly damaged ship was shelled and sunk by US submarine USS Bashaw in the same location. A single survivor was rescued.
