= USS Bache =

Three ships associated with the United States Navy have been named Bache.

- USC&GS A. D. Bache (1871), a United States Coast and Geodetic Survey survey ship named for Alexander Dallas Bache, former Superintendent of the Coast Survey, which was assigned to temporary duty with the U.S. Navy between January and June 1898.
- USC&GS A. D. Bache (1901), a United States Coast and Geodetic Survey survey ship named for Alexander Dallas Bache, former Superintendent of the Coast Survey, which served as a patrol vessel in the U.S. Navy from 24 September 1917 to 1 April 1919 and then was returned to the U.S. Coast and Geodetic Survey.
- USS Bache (DD-470), named for Commander George M. Bache, a destroyer in commission from 1942 to 1968.
