= USC&GS A. D. Bache =

USC&GS A. D. Bache or USC&GS Bache may refer to:

- USC&GS A. D. Bache (1871), a survey ship in commission in the United States Coast Survey and United States Coast and Geodetic Survey from ca. 1871–1872 until January 1898 and from June 1898 until 1900
- USC&GS A. D. Bache (1901), a survey ship in commission in the United States Coast and Geodetic Survey from 1902 until 1917 and from 1919 until ca. 1927

== See also ==
- USS Bache (DD-470), a United States Navy destroyer in commission from 1942 to 1968
