= Robert S. Svob =

American football player and college official (1919–2017)

Robert Stanley Svob
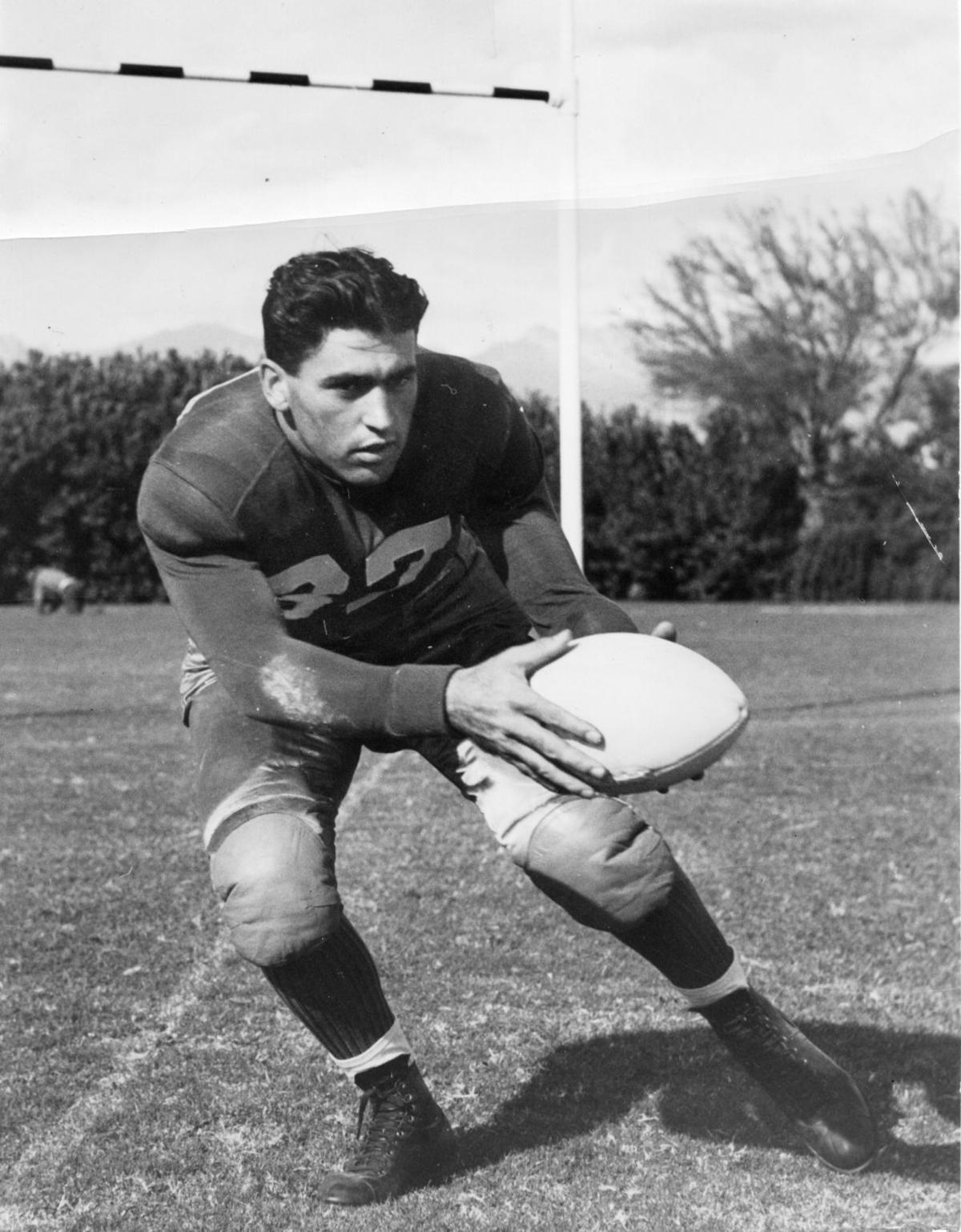
- Bob Svob was a standout player for the University of Arizona in football and would go on to become the school's dean of students.
- Born: February 15, 1919; Jerome, Arizona
- Died: August 31, 2017 (aged 98); Tucson, Arizona
- Monuments: The Svob Family (HM2G87)
- Education: Bachelor's Degree in Physical Education, Master's Degree in Administration

Robert Stanley Svob (February 15, 1919 – August 31, 2017), known commonly as Bob Svob, was the Dean of Students at the University of Arizona, serving from 1972 to 1983. As a member of the University of Arizona staff starting in 1941, he also served as the freshman football coach, Director of Intramural Sports, assistant athletic director, and the Dean of Men.

== Early life ==
Svob was born into a family of Croatian immigrants in Jerome, Arizona. His parents were Mary Svob (1879–1937) and Ignac John Svob (1881–1937), who was born in Fuzina (Current day Croatia) and died of lung silicosis, the result of working in the copper mine under the town of Jerome. Svob graduated from Jerome High School with All-State football honors in 1937 with a football scholarship to the University of Arizona.

== Athletic career ==
After a well-renounced athletic career in high school football and basketball, Svob played football at the University of Arizona, where for four years, he earned a varsity letter as both a running back and a fullback for the Wildcats.

== Career after football ==
After graduating from the University of Arizona and receiving his Bachelor's degree in Physical Education and Master's Degree in Administration, Svob joined the physical education staff at the University of Arizona in 1942. He joined the staff as the freshman football coach in 1941, which he served again in 1947 and 1948. Later, he was Director of Intramural Sports in 1942 until 1958. Svob then served as assistant athletic director from 1959 to 1966. He was later appointed Dean of Men from 1966 until 1972. He finished his career at the university and retired after serving as dean of students until 1983. Partly through his career, he served in the United States Navy in World War II, serving as a ferry driver on the Japanese island of Saipan.

== Death and funeral ==
On August 31, 2017, Svob died at age 98. His wife, Shirley Svob had died in 2001. His funeral was held at St. Mark's Presbyterian Church (Tucson, Arizona), on September 23, 2017.

== Awards and recognition ==
- Dean Robert Svob Outstanding Fraternity Award
- University of Arizona Sports Hall of Fame (1985)
- Pima County Sports Hall of Fame (1996)
- Beta Phi Hall of Honor (2002)
- YMCA Hall of Fame (2014)
