= List of Beta Theta Pi chapters =

Beta Theta Pi is a collegiate social fraternity established at Miami University in 1839. In the following list, active chapters are indicated in bold and inactive chapters are indicated in italics.

Chapter	Charter date and range	Institution	City or county	State or province	Status	Ref.
**Alpha**	August 8, 1839 – 1847; 1852–1872, 1886–1998, 2000–2013, 2015–2016, 2020	Miami University	Oxford	Ohio	Active	(Note: Chapter was closed in 2013 for hazing and substance abuse. It reformed as a colony in 2016.)
Beta Prime	1840–1843	Cincinnati Law College	Cincinnati	Ohio	Inactive	
Beta (see Gamma Prime and **Lambda Kappa-Beta**)	1841–1868, 1881–1967, 19xx ?–1979	Western Reserve University	Cleveland	Ohio	Inactive	(Note: This was the reestablishment of the Gamma Prime chapter which went inactive in 1868. It merged with a Lambda Kappa chapter to form Lambda Kappa-Beta when their two colleges merged as Case Western Reserve University.)
Gamma Prime (see Beta and **Lambda Kappa-Beta**)	1841–1867	Western Reserve University	Cleveland	Ohio	Inactive	(Note: This chapter was expelled in 1868. It was reestablished as Beta Second chapter in 1880.)
**Beta Kappa**	November 9, 1841 – 1846; 1854–2010; 2015	Ohio University	Athens	Ohio	Active	(Note: The chapter started as a colony in 2012.)
Epsilon Prime	1842–1847	Transylvania University	Lexington	Kentucky	Inactive	
**Gamma**	June 1, 1842	Washington & Jefferson College	Washington	Pennsylvania	Active	(Note: Gamma chapter was founded at Jefferson College in 1842 and merged with Washington College's Nu chapter (founded in 1855) when the two colleges joined as Washington & Jefferson in 1865.)
Eta Prime	1842–1847, 1880–1901	Harvard University	Cambridge	Massachusetts	Inactive	(Note: The chapter returned its charter in 1901 and became a local fraternity.)
Theta Prime (see **Theta Epsilon**)	1843–1845	Princeton University	Princeton	New Jersey	Inactive	(Note: Reestablished as Theta Epsilon.)
**Delta**	April 23, 1845	DePauw University	Greencastle	Indiana	Active	
**Pi**	August 27, 1845 – 1849; 1856–2001; 2005	Indiana University	Bloomington	Indiana	Active	(Note: This chapter's charter was revoked in 2001. It was reformed as a colony in 2003.)
Lambda	November 13, 1845 – 1850; 1854–1864; 1877–2007; 2011 – 2025	University of Michigan	Ann Arbor	Michigan	Inactive	(Note: Chapter was reestablished as a colony in 2010.)
**Tau**	July 27, 1846 – 1849; 1854	Wabash College	Crawfordsville	Indiana	Active	
Zeta Prime	1847–1850, 1914–1963	Williams College	Williamstown	Massachusetts	Inactive	(Note: The Williams chapter left Beta to join Alpha Delta Phi in 1851. It was reformed in 1915 by absorbing the local fraternity Psi Omega, established in 1912. The chapter's charter was returned when Williams banned fraternities in the mid-1960s.)
**Epsilon**	May 27, 1848 – 1862; 1873–2006; 2011	Centre College	Danville	Kentucky	Active	(Note: This chapter's charter was revoked in 2006. It reformed as a colony in 2011.)
Kappa	1849–1851, 1880–1973	Brown University	Providence	Rhode Island	Inactive	(Note: The chapter withdrew from Beta Theta Pi to join Alpha Delta Phi as its Brunonian chapter in 1851. It was reestablished in 1880 by absorbing the remaining chapter of Phi Kappa Alpha literary society.)
Zeta	1850–1912; 198x ? –2003; 2005–2012	Hampden–Sydney College	Hampden Sydney	Virginia	Inactive	(Note: After the Civil War, the sole remaining chapter of the Virginia regional fraternity, Delta Epsilon, was absorbed to restore the dormant Zeta chapter which had "been killed off" during the conflict.) (Note: Chapter was re-established as a colony in 1987 and 2005. It was closed due to hazing in 2012, including forced alcohol consumption.)
**Eta**	April 28, 1852 – 1861; 1889–2001; 2003	University of North Carolina at Chapel Hill	Chapel Hill	North Carolina	Active	(Note: Eta chapter went dormant in 1860 but was restored with the absorption of the Mystical Seven's Temple of the Star and of the South in 1889. (This Mystical Seven chapter was founded in 1884). It formed as a colony in 2003.)
Theta	1853–2001	Ohio Wesleyan University	Delaware	Ohio	Inactive	(Note: The chapter was suspended in 2000.)
**Iota**	1853–2007, 2011–2014, 2024	Hanover College	Hanover	Indiana	Active	(Note: This chapter closed 2014 due to low membership numbers. All active members were changed to alumni status.)
Mu	1854–1859, 1866–1878, 1881–1889	Cumberland College	Lebanon	Tennessee	Inactive	(Note: The chapter was inactive during the Civil War. It surrendered its charter in 1888.)
Nu Prime (see **Gamma**)	1855–1865	Washington College	Washington	Pennsylvania	Inactive	(Note: This chapter merged with the Gamma chapter when Washington College joined with Jefferson College to become Washington and Jefferson College in 1865.)
**Xi**	April 1, 1855 – 1873; 1888	Knox College	Galesburg	Illinois	Active	(Note: Reformed in 1889 by absorbing a local chapter of Omicron Eta Phi established in 1887.)
**Omicron**	April 24, 1855 – 1861; 1865–1973; 1980–2005; 2008	University of Virginia	Charlottesville	Virginia	Active	(Note: Omicron chapter went dormant in 1875 but was restored in 1890 with the absorption of the Mystical Seven's Temple of the Hands and Torch, established in 1867, in a small national merger with three chapters of that fraternity. It was reformed into a colony in 1978 and 2007.)
Sigma Prime	1856–1866	Illinois College	Jacksonville	Illinois	Inactive	
Alpha Rho	1856–1859, 1865–1880, 1917–2004, 2007–2018	Washington and Lee University	Lexington	Virginia	Inactive	(Note: Chapter was reformed in 1918 by absorbing the local group Trident (formed in 1915). It was reformed as a colony in 2007.) (Note: Charter suspended in 2018 for hazing.)
**Upsilon**	January 31, 1858 – 1861; 1989–1999; 2010	University of South Carolina	Columbia	South Carolina	Active	(Note: This chapter's charter was revoked in 1861 and 2000. It reformed as a colony in 1986 and 2010.)
Phi Prime (see **Phi Alpha**)	1858–1861, 1866–1868	Davidson College	Davidson	North Carolina	Inactive	(Note: Reestablished as Phi Alpha in 1890.)
Chi Prime	1859–1861	Oglethorpe University	Brookhaven	Georgia	Inactive	
Chi	1860–1865, 1872–1987	Beloit College	Beloit	Wisconsin	Inactive	
**Psi**	December 9, 1860 – 1865; 1871–2003; 2006	Bethany College	Bethany	West Virginia	Active	
Omega Prime	1863–1865	United States Naval Academy	Annapolis	Maryland	Inactive	(Note: This chapter was never chartered and was disestablished by a Department of the Navy directive against secret societies in 1865.)
Alpha Alpha Prime	1865–1878	Monmouth College	Monmouth	Illinois	Inactive	(Note: In 1877, the chapter surrendered "its charter rather than reveal its existence as a sub rosa chapter.")
**Alpha Beta**	May 18, 1866 – 1872; 1880–2002; 2010	University of Iowa	Iowa City	Iowa	Active	(Note: This chapter's charter was revoked in 2002. It was re-established as a colony in 2006.)
**Alpha Gamma**	January 18, 1867	Wittenberg University	Springfield	Ohio	Active	
**Alpha Delta**	March 5, 1868	Westminster College	Fulton	Missouri	Active	
Alpha Epsilon	1868–1915	Iowa Wesleyan University	Mount Pleasant	Iowa	Inactive	(Note: This chapter was pulled in 1915 "...because of discontent within the institution.")
Lambda Rho	1868–1875, 1895–1965	University of Chicago	Chicago	Illinois	Inactive	(Note: Chapter may have been established as Lambda Second. However, when it was re-chartered, that name had been reassigned, resulting in the out-of-sequence chapter name Lambda Rho.)
**Alpha Eta**	December 23, 1868 – 2001; 2008	Denison University	Granville	Ohio	Active	(Note: This chapter was formed in 1868 by absorbing Kappa Phi Lambda, established in 1866. Its charter was revoked in 2001. It was reformed as a colony in 2004.)
Alpha Theta	1869–1880	Virginia Military Institute	Lexington	Virginia	Inactive	
**Alpha Iota**	April 1, 1869 – 1879; 1901–1992; 2000	Washington University in St. Louis	St. Louis	Missouri	Active	(Note: This chapter was reestablished in 1901 by absorbing the Hatchett Club, established in 1873). It reformed as a colony in 1997.)
Alpha Kappa	1871–1896	University of Richmond	Richmond	Virginia	Inactive	
Alpha Lambda	1871–1913	College of Wooster	Wooster	Ohio	Inactive	(Note: This chapter went inactive in 1913 due to a ban by the Board of Trustees. Its successor on campus is Beta Kappa Phi (local) or "I Section" which remains active today.)
**Alpha Mu**	June 1, 1872 – 1879; 2022	Samford University	Homewood	Alabama	Active	(Note: Chapter formed at Howard College, which became Samford University in 1965.)
**Alpha Nu**	January 8, 1873	University of Kansas	Lawrence	Kansas	Active	(Note: Chapter formed by absorbing the local group Oread Society.)
Alpha Xi	1873–1893	Randolph–Macon College	Ashland	Virginia	Inactive	
Alpha Omicron	1873–1881	Trinity University	San Antonio	Texas	Inactive	(Note: This chapter's charter was revoked in 1881.)
**Alpha Pi**	June 6, 1873	University of Wisconsin–Madison	Madison	Wisconsin	Active	
Rho	1873–1992, 2002–2018	Northwestern University	Evanston	Illinois	Inactive	(Note: Chapter was reestablished as a colony in 1997.)
Alpha Sigma	1874–2000	Dickinson College	Carlisle	Pennsylvania	Inactive	(Note: Chapter formed from a local group called the Independents (established in 1870).)
Theta Epsilon (see Theta Prime}	1875–1879, 1994–2003	Princeton University	Princeton	New Jersey	Inactive	(Note: The chapter was underground between 1875-1879. It was originally named Theta chapter but was renamed when it reformed as a colony in 1993.)
Alpha Tau Prime (see **Zeta Upsilon**)	March 11, 1876 – 1877	College of William & Mary	Williamsburg	Virginia	Inactive	(Note: Later, this chapter was reestablished as Zeta Upsilon.)
Alpha Upsilon Prime	1876–1913	Boston College	Chestnut Hills	Massachusetts	Inactive	
**Alpha Phi**	March 10, 1877 – 1880; 1972–2001; 2007	Virginia Tech	Blacksburg	Virginia	Active	(Note: Chapter reformed in 1973 by absorbing Tau Epsilon Kappa, established in 1964. After going dormant, it reformed as a colony in 2003.)
**Alpha Chi**	November 30, 1877 – 1878; 1993	Johns Hopkins University	Baltimore	Maryland	Active	(Note: Chapter was reestablished as a colony in 1990.)
**Alpha Psi**	March 28, 1878 – 1881; 2021	Butler University	Indianapolis	Indiana	Active	(Note: Chapter was reformed as a colony in 2017.)
**Omega**	1879 – 2013; 2025	University of California, Berkeley	Berkeley	California	Active	(Note: Omega chapter was closed in 2013 because of hazing and substance abuse, ongoing risk management violations, and violations of university and fraternity policies.)
**Beta Alpha**	April 8, 1879 – 1891; 1894	Kenyon College	Gambier	Ohio	Active	
**Beta Beta**	June 5, 1879 – 1899; 1929–1994; 2006	University of Mississippi	Oxford	Mississippi	Active	(Note: Chapter formed in 1879 by absorbing the last remaining chapter of Alpha Kappa Phi, which had been chartered in 1859 and revived in 1867. It was revived in 1929 by absorbing a chapter of Theta Beta, established in 1926. It reformed as a colony in 2004.)
Beta Gamma	1879–1886, 1892–2000	Rutgers University	New Brunswick	New Jersey	Inactive	(Note: Chapter was created in 1879 by a national merger with Alpha Sigma Chi (this chapter was established in 1873). Its charter was revoked in 2000.)
**Sigma**	October 9, 1879	Stevens Institute of Technology	Hoboken	New Jersey	Active	(Note: Chapter created in 1879 by a national merger with Alpha Sigma Chi, which had a chapter at Stevens that formed in 1875.)
**Beta Delta**	October 9, 1879	Cornell University	Ithaca	New York	Active	(Note: Chapter Formed in 1879 by the national merger with Alpha Sigma Chi (this chapter was established in 1872).)
**Beta Zeta**	October 9, 1879 – 2005; 2009	St. Lawrence University	Canton	New York	Active	(Note: Chapter was created in 1879 by a national merger with Alpha Sigma Chi (this chapter was first formed in 1878).) (Note: The chapter was suspended in 2005 and reformed as a colony in 2009.)
**Beta Eta**	October 9, 1879 – 1988; 1992	University of Maine	Orono	Maine	Active	(Note: Chapter created in 1879 by a national merger with Alpha Sigma Chi(this chapter first formed in 1875). It was closed in 1989 over allegations of hazing and drug violations. It was re-established as a colony in 1991.)
Mu Epsilon	1890–2014	Wesleyan University	Middletown	Connecticut	Inactive	(Note: This chapter originated as the 'Temple of the Wand (2) chapter of the Mystical Seven society formed in 1889.) (Note: This chapter was suspended by the university in 2014 due to unsafe activity.)
**Phi**	September 1, 1880 – 1892; 1894–1968; 1977–1985; 1986	University of Pennsylvania	Philadelphia	Pennsylvania	Active	(Note: Chapter started as a colony in 1876. The national fraternity suspended it from the fall of 1985 through the summer of 1986.)
**Beta Theta**	December 10, 1880	Colgate University	Hamilton	New York	Active	(Note: This chapter began by absorbing the local fraternity, Adelphian, established in 1872).)
Nu	1881–1997	Union College	Schenectady	New York	Inactive	
Alpha Alpha	October 14, 1881 – 2000; 2003-2024	Columbia University	New York City	New York	Inactive	(Note: This chapter was closed for behavioral problems in 2000. It was revived as a colony in 2002.)
Beta Iota	1884–1969	Amherst College	Amherst	Massachusetts	Inactive	(Note: Chapter started by absorbing the local Torch & Crown, established in 1879). Its charter was revoked in 1969.)
**Beta Lambda**	February 23, 1884 – 2016; 2021	Vanderbilt University	Nashville	Tennessee	Active	(Note: Chapter's charter was revoked in 2016. It was reformed as a colony in 2021.)
**Theta Delta**	December 11, 1885 – 2012; 2019	Ohio State University	Columbus	Ohio	Active	(Note: Chapter formed by absorbing the local Phi Alpha, established in 1884. It was revived as a colony in 2015.)
**Beta Omicron**	May 18, 1886 – 2009; 2018	University of Texas at Austin	Austin	Texas	Active	(Note: The chapter was reformed as a colony in the fall of 2015 and was rechartered in 2018)
**Alpha Tau**	September 13, 1888	University of Nebraska–Lincoln	Lincoln	Nebraska	Active	
Alpha Upsilon	1888–2009, 2013–2017	Pennsylvania State University	University Park	Pennsylvania	Inactive	(Note: After a drunk student fell to their death at a Alpha Upsilon chapter's party, the university revoked its recognition of the fraternity for minimum of five years. The national fraternity closed the chapter in 2017. The university subsequently announced a permanent ban on the fraternity on its campus.)
Alpha Omega	1889–1996	Dartmouth College	Hanover	New Hampshire	Inactive	(Note: Chapter formed by absorbing the last chapter of Sigma Delta Pi, a small national fraternity that was established at Dartmouth in 1858. The chapter was closed in 1996 for violations of college and fraternity policies.)
**Alpha Zeta**	February 28, 1889 – 2007; 2014	University of Denver	Denver	Colorado	Active	(Note: This chapter's charter was revoked in 2007. It was reformed as a colony in 2011.)
Beta Epsilon	1889–1956, 1969–2000	Syracuse University	Syracuse	New York	Inactive	(Note: Chapter was revived in 1969 by absorbing the local Beta Epsilon, established in 1956.)
**Beta Pi**	November 29, 1889	University of Minnesota	Minneapolis	Minnesota	Active	
**Beta Nu**	April 8, 1890 – 2002; 2004	University of Cincinnati	Cincinnati	Ohio	Active	(Note: Chapter formed in 1890 by absorbing the local Chi Sigma Zeta, established in 1887. It was named out of Greek alphabetic order in recognition of the failed Beta chapter at another Cincinnati institution.)
**Zeta Phi**	October 8, 1890	University of Missouri	Columbia	Missouri	Active	(Note: Zeta Phi was an independent local fraternity, founded in 1870, which merged with Beta Theta Pi in 1890. The chapter was named Zeta Phi out of Greek alphabet order because of its origin.)
Beta Chi	1891–2008	Lehigh University	Bethlehem	Pennsylvania	Inactive	(Note: In 2008, this chapter was closed for a minimum of ten years by the General Fraternity and university due to serious alcohol violations.)
Phi Chi	1892–1966, 1992–2007	Yale University	New Haven	Connecticut	Inactive	
Lambda Sigma	1894–1997	Stanford University	Stanford	California	Inactive	(Note: Started as a colony in 1892. Its charter was suspended in 1997.)
Beta Sigma	1900–1989	Bowdoin College	Brunswick	Maine	Inactive	(Note: Chapter started by absorbing the local Sword & Shield, established in 1899). Its charter was revoked in 1989.)
**Beta Tau**	1900–1970; 1979–1991; April 9, 2022	University of Colorado Boulder	Boulder	Colorado	Active	(Note: Formed in 1900 from the group Beta Tau Omega (established 1899).) (Note: The chapter was reformed as a colony in 1978 and 2018. It was most recently rechartered in 2021 and installed in 2022.)
**Beta Psi**	1900–2014; 2024	West Virginia University	Morgantown	West Virginia	Active	(Note: Chapter was created from and named for the local group Beta Psi, established in 1898. Its charter was suspended in 2014 because of hazing, alcohol, and controlled substances. It reformed as a provisional chapter (colony) in 2024.)
**Beta Omega**	December 20, 1901	University of Washington	Seattle	Washington	Active	(Note: Chapter started by absorbing Pi Theta, established in 1900). In October 2014, its chapter was suspended by the university following hazing allegations. The fraternity disbanded the chapter a month later, following an investigation.)
**Sigma Rho**	February 28, 1902 – 2009; 2016–2018; 2021	University of Illinois Urbana-Champaign	Urbana	Illinois	Active	(Note: Chapter started absorbing Sigma Delta, established in 1901. Its charter was evoked in 2009. It was reestablished in 2021.)
**Beta Mu**	September 26, 1903 – 2012; 2017	Purdue University	West Lafayette	Indiana	Active	(Note: Chapter's charter was revoked in 2012; it was reestablished as a colony in 2015.)
Lambda Kappa (see **Lambda Kappa-Beta**)	1905–1979	Case Institute of Technology	Cleveland	Ohio	Inactive	(Note: Started in 1905 by absorbing the local Lambda Kappa (established in 1892).) (Note: In 1967, Western Reserve University merged with the Case School of Applied Science, forming Case Western Reserve University. This chapter became the Lambda Kappa-Beta chapter after a merger with the Beta chapter at Western Reserve.)
**Tau Sigma**	November 25, 1905 – 2005; 2010	Iowa State University	Ames	Iowa	Active	(Note: Chapter formed by absorbing the local Tri Serps, established in 1900. It was reformed as a colony in 2006.)
**Theta Zeta**	November 9, 1906	University of Toronto	Toronto	Ontario	Active	(Note: Chapter was formed by absorbing Theta Zeta, established in 1904, giving this chapter a name that was out of Greek alphabetic order.)
**Gamma Phi**	October 18, 1907	University of Oklahoma	Norman	Oklahoma	Active	(Note: Chapter formed by absorbing the local group Gamma Phi, established in 1904, giving this chapter its name that was out of Greek alphabetic order.)
Beta Xi	1908–1983	Tulane University	New Orleans	Louisiana	Inactive	(Note: Chapter formed in 1908 by absorbing the local Alpha Delta Xi, established in 1906. Its charter was revoked in 1983.)
**Beta Phi**	September 17, 1908	Colorado School of Mines	Golden	Colorado	Active	(Note: Chapter started by absorbing the local Crucible Club, established in 1903.)
**Beta Rho**	December 4, 1909 – 2016; 2023	University of Oregon	Eugene	Oregon	Active	(Note: In 2016, this chapter was disbanded due to hazing and other "high-risk" activities. It was re-established in 2019 as a colony.)
**Gamma Alpha**	October 5, 1912	University of South Dakota	Vermillion	South Dakota	Active	(Note: Established in 1912 by absorbing Beta Gamma (established in 1902).)
**Beta Upsilon**	September 27, 1913 – 2011; 2019	Massachusetts Institute of Technology	Cambridge	Massachusetts	Active	(Note: Chapter was created in 1913 by absorbing the local Kappa Theta, established in 1904). It reformed as a colony in 2012 and was rechartered in December 2019. It was installed on April 20, 2022.)
**Gamma Beta**	October 25, 1913 – 2010; 2013	University of Utah	Salt Lake City	Utah	Active	(Note: Chapter formed by absorbing the local Alpha Pi, established in 1905. Its charter was revoked in 2010. It was re-established as a colony in 2011.)
**Gamma Gamma**	September 19, 1914	University of Idaho	Moscow	Idaho	Active	(Note: Chapter formed by absorbing Phi Mu Epsilon, established in 1905.)
Gamma Delta	1914–1990	Colorado College	Colorado Springs	Colorado	Inactive	(Note: Chapter created by absorbing the local Delta Phi Theta, established in 1906. Its charter was revoked in 1990.)
**Gamma Epsilon**	October 17, 1914	Kansas State University	Manhattan	Kansas	Active	(Note: Chapter formed by absorbing Tau Omega Epsilon, established in 1901.)
**Gamma Zeta**	March 29, 1916	Whitman College	Walla Walla	Washington	Active	(Note: Chapter formed by absorbing Alpha Phi Delta (local), established in 1909. The earlier local had no affiliation with the national fraternity of the same name, which originated a few years later at Syracuse University.)
**Gamma Eta**	January 6, 1917 – 2011; 2020	Georgia Tech	Atlanta	Georgia	Active	(Note: Chapter started by absorbing Alpha Phi Alpha (local), established in 1919. After going dormant, it was re-established as a colony in 2012. The earlier local had no affiliation with the latter-formed Nu Mu chapter of the national fraternity, Alpha Phi Alpha, created on the campus in 1977.)
**Gamma Theta**	January 12, 1920	Washington State University	Pullman	Washington	Active	(Note: Chapter formed by absorbing the local Gamma Delta, established in 1912.)
Gamma Iota	1920–2013	Carnegie Mellon University	Pittsburgh	Pennsylvania	Inactive	(Note: Chapter formed by absorbing the local Sigma Rho, established in 1906. It closed in 2013 after allegations of sexual misconduct, specifically the circulation of photos and videos with explicit sexual content.)
**Gamma Kappa**	November 17, 1922	University of North Dakota	Grand Forks	North Dakota	Active	(Note: Chapter formed by absorbing Delta Sigma, established in 1911.)
**Gamma Lambda**	January 6, 1923 – 1998; 2001	Oklahoma State University–Stillwater	Stillwater	Oklahoma	Active	(Note: Chapter formed by absorbing Delta Sigma, established in 1908). It closed in 1998 for hazing activities involving alcohol abuse.)
Gamma Mu	1923–1998	Oregon State University	Corvallis	Oregon	Inactive	(Note: Chapter formed by absorbing the local Kappa Theta Rho, established in 1914. It reformed as a colony in 2017. However, the colony was closed in 2022.)
**Gamma Nu**	December 30, 1926	University of California, Los Angeles	Los Angeles	California	Active	(Note: Chapter formed by absorbing Alpha Pi, established in 1921.)
**Gamma Xi**	December 12, 1930	University of Florida	Gainesville	Florida	Active	(Note: Chapter formed by absorbing Sigma Alpha Phi, established in 1926.)
Epsilon Omega	October 30, 1933 – 2023	Eastern Washington University	Cheney	Washington	Inactive	(Note: Chapter started as a colony in 1990.)
**Gamma Omicron**	December 23, 1936	University of British Columbia	Vancouver	British Columbia	Active	
**Gamma Pi**	December 19, 1936	Lawrence University	Appleton	Wisconsin	Active	(Note: Chapter started by absorbing Beta Sigma Phi, established in 1902.)
Gamma Rho	1939–2008	Duke University	Durham	North Carolina	Inactive	
Gamma Sigma	1947–2011; 2018–2021	Willamette University	Salem	Oregon	Inactive	(Note: Chapter started by absorbing Kappa Gamma Rho, established in 1920. It reformed as a colony in 2014.)
**Gamma Tau**	October 26, 1947 – 2003; 2008–2019; 2021	University of Southern California	Los Angeles	California	Active	(Note: Chapter started as a colony in 1946. After going dormant, it was re-established as a colony in 2006. It went inactive in 2019 but retained its 2008 charter and was reestablished in 2021.)
**Gamma Upsilon**	November 23, 1948	Emory University	Atlanta	Georgia	Active	
Gamma Chi	1950–2016	Sewanee: The University of the South	Sewanee	Tennessee	Inactive	(Note: Chapter started as a colony in 1948. Its charter was suspended for hazing culture in 2016.)
**Gamma Psi**	January 5, 1950 – 2006; 2015	Michigan State University	East Lansing	Michigan	Active	(Note: Chapter started in 1950 by absorbing Beta Tau, established in 1947). Its charter was revoked in 2007. It was re-established as a chapter in 2011.)
**Gamma Omega**	October 5, 1951 – 2005; 2011	Southern Methodist University	Dallas	Texas	Active	(Note: Chapter started as a colony in 1949. After going dormant, it reformed as a colony in 2009.)
Delta Alpha	1952–2007	University of Western Ontario	London	Ontario	Inactive	(Note: Chapter started by absorbing Kappa Tau Sigma, established in 1933). Its charter was revoked in 2007.)
**Delta Beta**	1959–1969, 1989–2020, 2024	University of Arizona	Tucson	Arizona	Active	(Note: Chapter formed by absorbing Delta Beta, established in 1958). It reformed as a colony in 1986 and was rechartered in 1988. Its charter was suspended in 2020 for incidents related to hazing and alcohol use. It reformed as a colony in 2023)
**Delta Gamma**	November 15, 1959	Wichita State University	Wichita	Kansas	Active	(Note: Chapter started by absorbing Alpha Gamma Gamma, established in 1916.)
Delta Delta	1962–2005; 2019-2023	Bowling Green State University	Bowling Green	Ohio	Inactive	(Note: Chapter by absorbing Beta Gamma, established in 1959. Its charter was revoked in 2005. It was re-established as a colony in 2019 but failed to be rechartered.)
Delta Epsilon	1962–2011, 2017-2023	University of Puget Sound	Tacoma	Washington	Inactive	(Note: Chapter started by absorbing Beta Zeta Pi, established 1961. It reformed as a colony in 2014. Recruiting challenges and low membership led members to vote to relinquish their charter. The chapter closed and the letters were removed from the chapter house on February 28th, 2023.)
**Delta Zeta**	1964–2019; 2024	Auburn University	Auburn	Alabama	Active	(Note: The chapter was shut down in 2019 after a long history of hazing violations which included alcohol and physical abuse and servitude.)
**Delta Eta**	November 7, 1964	Kettering University	Flint	Michigan	Active	(Note: Chapter started by absorbing Beta Alpha Epsilon, established in 1953.)
**Delta Theta**	January 9, 1965	University of Alabama	Tuscaloosa	Alabama	Active	(Note: Chapter started by absorbing Beta Pi, established in 1960.)
Delta Iota	1965–2003	Ball State University	Muncie	Indiana	Inactive	(Note: Chapter started by absorbing Sigma Theta, established in 1962. Its charter was revoked in 2003.)
**Delta Kappa**	November 4, 1967	University of Tennessee	Knoxville	Tennessee	Active	
**Delta Lambda**	November 16, 1969 – Jan 1998; 2018	Florida State University	Tallahassee	Florida	Active	
**Delta Mu**	February 21, 1970 – 2010; 2021	Texas Tech University	Lubbock	Texas	Active	(Note: The chapter started as a colony in 1968. After going dormant, it was reformed as a colony in 2015.)
**Delta Nu**	November 7, 1970 – 1988; 1992-1994; 1996	Clemson University	Clemson	South Carolina	Active	(Note: Chapter started by absorbing Sigma Kappa Epsilon, established in 1949). It was re-established as a colony in the 1990s.)
**Delta Xi**	November 7, 1971 – 2003; 2010	Eastern Kentucky University	Richmond	Kentucky	Active	(Note: The chapter started by absorbing Alpha Chi Alpha, established in 1969. It was reformed as a colony in 2006.)
Delta Omicron	1971–1995	Weber State University	Ogden	Utah	Inactive	(Note: Chapter formed by absorbing the Excelsior Club, established in 1931.)
**Delta Pi**	November 6, 1971	University of Louisville	Louisville	Kentucky	Active	(Note: Chapter founded by absorbing Nu Sigma Chi, established in 1964.)
**Delta Rho**	January 20, 1971	University of Texas at Arlington	Arlington	Texas	Active	(Note: Chapter formed by absorbing Beta Phi Sigma, established in 1969.)
Delta Sigma	1975–2001, 2005–2022	University of California, Irvine	Irvine	California	Inactive	(Note: This chapter started as a colony in 1973. After going dormant, it reformed as a colony in 2005.)
Delta Tau	1977–1982, 1986–1992, 2021–2022	Arizona State University	Tempe	Arizona	Inactive	(Note: Chapter started as a colony in 1975. After going dormant, it was restarted as a colony in the 1980s and 2017.)
Delta Upsilon	1977–1999, 2017–2020	University of Houston	Houston	Texas	Inactive	
Delta Phi	1977–2009	Wright State University	Dayton	Ohio	Inactive	
Delta Chi	1978–1984	Western Michigan University	Kalamazoo	Michigan	Inactive	(Note: This chapter's charter was revoked at 145th General Convention in 1984.)
**Lambda Kappa-Beta** (see Beta and Lambda Kappa)	September 5, 1979	Case Western Reserve University	Cleveland	Ohio	Active	(Note: In 1967, Western Reserve University merged with the Case School of Applied Science, forming Case Western Reserve University. This chapter became the Lambda Kappa-Beta chapter after a merger with the Lambda Kappa chapter at Case School.)
**Delta Psi**	November 22, 1980 – 1996; –2011; 2016	Baylor University	Waco	Texas	Active	(Note: This chapter formed by absorbing Tau Alpha Sigma, established in 1947. After going dormant, it was re-established as a colony in 1995 and 2012.)
**Delta Omega**	October 30, 1982 – 2006; 2012	University of Maryland, College Park	College Park	Maryland	Active	
**Epsilon Alpha**	January 22, 1983 – 1994; 2006	East Carolina University	Greenville	North Carolina	Active	
**Epsilon Beta**	February 5, 1984 – 2000; April 12, 2025	San Diego State University	San Diego	California	Active	
**Epsilon Gamma**	November 10, 1985 – 2002, 2008	Central Michigan University	Mount Pleasant	Michigan	Active	(Note: Chapter started as a colony in 1983. It was re-established as a colony in 2004.)
**Epsilon Delta**	October 18, 1986	California Polytechnic State University, San Luis Obispo	San Luis Obispo	California	Active	
**Epsilon Epsilon**	February 7, 1987	University of Georgia	Athens	Georgia	Active	
Epsilon Zeta	1986–2000	University of Guelph	Guelph	Ontario	Inactive	
**Epsilon Eta**	March 7, 1987	Texas A&M University	College Station	Texas	Active	(Note: Chapter formed by absorbing the local group, Aggie Cowboys, established in the 1970s.)
Epsilon Theta	1988–2010	Middle Tennessee State University	Murfreesboro	Tennessee	Inactive	(Note: Chapter started as a colony in 1984. It was suspended in 2010.)
Epsilon Iota	1987–2007; 2025	California State University, Chico	Chico	California	Active	(Note: Chapter started as a colony in 1985. Its charter was revoked in 2007. Reestablished in 2025.)
**Epsilon Kappa**	December 10, 1988 – 1999; 2007 – 2012 November 13th, 2022	Colorado State University	Fort Collins	Colorado	Active	
Epsilon Lambda	1989–2018	University of Missouri–Kansas City	Kansas City	Missouri	Inactive	(Note: Chapter started as a colony in 1984.)
**Epsilon Mu**	April 1, 1989 – 1997; 2016	George Mason University	Fairfax	Virginia	Active	**(Note: The chapter started as a colony in 1985. It was reformed as a colony in 2016.)**
Epsilon Nu	1989–1996	McGill University	Montreal	Quebec	Inactive	(Note: This chapter was suspended/disbanded in 1996, largely for financial reasons.)
Epsilon Xi	1989–2003	Bishop's University	Lennoxville	Quebec	Inactive	
**Epsilon Omicron**	January 27, 1990 – 1997; 2010	University of Kentucky	Lexington	Kentucky	Active	(Note: Chapter started as a colony in 1986. After going dormant, it was re-established as a colony in 2010.)
Phi Alpha (see Phi Prime)	1890–1971	Davidson College	Davidson	North Carolina	Inactive	(Note: The Phi chapter went dormant in 1862 but was restored in 1890 as Phi Alpha by the national merger with Mystical Seven's Temple of the Sword and Shield. The Davidson chapter of Mystical Seven was founded in 1885. Phi Alpha's charter was revoked in 1971 when the university's administration changed to a policy of self-selection for fraternities.)
Epsilon Pi	1991–2014	University of California, Santa Barbara	Santa Barbara	California	Inactive	(Note: Chapter started as a colony in 1988. In December 2014, it was shut down by the national office after multiple years of violations and suspensions, including an incident where two pledges were hospitalized after hazing.)
**Epsilon Upsilon**	November 23, 1991	Carleton University	Ottawa	Ontario	Active	
Epsilon Rho	1992–1999	University of Hawaiʻi	Honolulu	Hawaii	Inactive	
Epsilon Sigma	1992–2002	University of California, Riverside	Riverside	California	Inactive	(Note: Epsilon Sigma Chapter at UC Riverside is not mentioned again in The Beta Theta Pi Magazine after the Winter 2002 issue, neither in self-reports nor in District Chief reports.)
Epsilon Tau	1992–2005, 2019–2022	University of Toledo	Toledo	Ohio	Inactive	
Epsilon Phi	1992–2006	Tennessee Technological University	Cookeville	Tennessee	Inactive	(Note: Chapter formed by absorbing Beta Phi Epsilon (local), established in 1983.)
Epsilon Chi	1992–2009	University of Rhode Island	Kingston	Rhode Island	Inactive	(Note: This chapter's charter was revoked in 2009 for alcohol abuse, hazing, and poor financial and chapter operations.)
Epsilon Psi	1993–2008	Binghamton University	Binghamton	New York	Inactive	(Note: Chapter started as a colony in 1989.)
Zeta Alpha	1994–2002	University of Lynchburg	Lynchburg	Virginia	Inactive	(Note: Chapter started in 1993 by absorbing the local group, B.E.T.A., established in 1986.)
**Zeta Beta**	March 26, 1994 – 2009; 2024	University of South Florida	Tampa	Florida	Active	(Note: Chapter started as a colony in 1991. Its charter was revoked in 2009. It was re-established as a colony in 2019.)
**Zeta Gamma**	April 29, 1995 – 1999; 2016	University of California, San Diego	San Diego	California	Active	(Note: This chapter's charter was revoked in 1999. It was reformed as a colony in 2013.)
**Zeta Delta**	April 1, 1995 – 2009; 2021	Florida Atlantic University	Boca Raton	Florida	Active	(Note: This chapter's charter was revoked in 2009. It was reestablished in 2021.)
**Zeta Epsilon**	March 18, 1995	Villanova University	Villanova	Pennsylvania	Active	(Note: Chapter started by absorbing Lambda Tau Delta, established in 1980.)
**Zeta Zeta**	April 8, 1995	University of Wisconsin–Oshkosh	Oshkosh	Wisconsin	Active	(Note: Chapter started by absorbing Omega Tau Phi, established in 1991.)
**Zeta Eta**	March 11, 1995	San Jose State University	San Jose	California	Active	
Zeta Theta	1996–2002	Bryant University	Smithfield	Rhode Island	Inactive	(Note: Chapter started by absorbing Beta Sigma Chi, established in 1923.)
Zeta Iota	1997 – February 5, 2000	Utah State University	Logan	Utah	Inactive	
**Zeta Nu**	November 15, 1997	George Washington University	Washington, D.C.	District of Columbia	Active	
**Zeta Xi**	November 15, 1997	Truman State University	Kirksville	Missouri	Active	(Note: Chapter started by absorbing Beta Lambda Epsilon, established in 1994.)
Zeta Kappa	1998–2003	University of Nevada Las Vegas	Las Vegas	Nevada	Inactive	
**Zeta Lambda**	April 4, 1998 – 2006; 2013	Furman University	Greenville	South Carolina	Active	(Note: The chapter started by absorbing Beta Epsilon, established in 1994. It was reformed as a colony in 2009.)
Zeta Mu	1998–2020	Nova Southeastern University	Davie	Florida	Inactive	
Zeta Omicron	1999–2021	Southern Illinois University	Carbondale	Illinois	Inactive	(Note: Chapter started by absorbing Sigma Chi Alpha, established in 1995.)
Zeta Pi	2000–2007	Pepperdine University	Malibu	California	Inactive	(Note: Chapter started by absorbing Beta Phi Alpha (local), established in 1986. Its charter was revoked in 2007.)
Zeta Rho	2002–2017	Texas A&M University–Corpus Christi	Corpus Christi	Texas	Inactive	(Note: This chapter started as a colony in 1998. It was disbanded in 2017 because it struggled to meet minimum operating expectations in recruitment, academics, and finances.)
Zeta Sigma	February 23, 2002 – 2011	West Chester University	West Chester	Pennsylvania	Inactive	
**Zeta Tau**	March 1, 2003	Saint Louis University	St. Louis	Missouri	Active	(Note: Chapter formed by absorbing Delta Beta Pi (local), established in 1983.)
**Zeta Upsilon** (see Alpha Tau Prime)	2004	College of William & Mary	Williamsburg	Virginia	Active	(Note: This was the re-establishment of Alpha Tau chapter.)
**Zeta Chi**	February 21, 2004	University of Connecticut	Storrs	Connecticut	Active	(Note: Chapter started as a colony in 1999.)
**Zeta Psi**	2003–2017, 2023	University of Central Florida	Orlando	Florida	Active	(Note: Chapter was shut down in 2018 due to repeated hazing and alcohol violations over ten years.)
**Zeta Omega**	November 9, 2007	University of San Diego	San Diego	California	Active	
**Eta Alpha**	November 10, 2007	Loyola Marymount University	Los Angeles	California	Active	
**Eta Beta**	May 2, 2009	University of Miami	Coral Gables	Florida	Active	
**Eta Gamma**	January 21, 2010 – 2025	Florida International University	Miami	Florida	Inactive	
**Eta Delta**	November 21, 2009	University of Dayton	Dayton	Ohio	Active	
**Eta Epsilon**	November 6, 2010	John Carroll University	University Heights	Ohio	Active	
**Eta Zeta**	April 13, 2013	Northeastern University	Boston	Massachusetts	Active	(Note: The chapter started as a colony in 2009.)
**Eta Eta**	December 5, 2014	Texas Christian University	Fort Worth	Texas	Active	(Note: The chapter started as a colony in 2011.)
**Eta Theta**	May 2, 2015	Chapman University	Orange	California	Active	
**Eta Iota**	April 11, 2015	Creighton University	Omaha	Nebraska	Active	
**Eta Kappa**	April 18, 2015	University of the Pacific	Stockton	California	Active	
Eta Lambda	2015–2017	College of Charleston	Charleston	South Carolina	Inactive	(Note: The College of Charleston Honor Board revoked its recognition in 2017 after code of conduct violations; Beta Theta Pi General Fraternity agreed with the decision. "The chapter's violations include hosting unregistered parties with alcohol, some of which was purchased using fraternity funds, marijuana use, and hazing involving personal servitude and calisthenics, according to college officials. The chapter will be allowed to reestablish in the fall of 2021.")
**Eta Mu**	April 23, 2016	University of Arkansas	Fayetteville	Arkansas	Active	
**Eta Nu**	February 6, 2016	University of Pittsburgh	Pittsburgh	Pennsylvania	Active	
**Eta Xi**	March 21, 2016	High Point University	High Point	North Carolina	Active	
Eta Omicron	May 27, 2016 – 2025	Drexel University	Philadelphia	Pennsylvania	Inactive	
Eta Pi	April 8, 2017 – 2025	American University	Washington, D.C.	District of Columbia	Inactive	(Note: Chapter was suspended for hazing.)
Eta Rho	2017 – 2022	North Carolina State University	Raleigh	North Carolina	Inactive	(Note: Chapter started as a colony in 2014. It was closed in 2022 over hazing allegations within its new member program.)
**Eta Sigma**	March 24, 2018	Quinnipiac University	Hamden	Connecticut	Active	(Note: The chapter started as a colony in 2013.)
**Eta Tau**	March 16, 2019	Worcester Polytechnic Institute	Worcester	Massachusetts	Active	
**Eta Upsilon**	April 13, 2019	Elon University	Elon	North Carolina	Active	
Eta Phi	2019 – 2022	Rockhurst University	Kansas City	Missouri	Inactive	(Note: The chapter started as a colony in 2016 and was chartered in 2019. It was installed in 2021.)
**Eta Chi**	November 20, 2019	University of Rochester	Rochester	New York	Active	(Note: The chapter started as a colony in 2016 and was chartered in 2019. It was installed in 2020.)
Eta Omega	November 22, 2019 – 2025	Loyola University Chicago	Chicago	Illinois	Inactive	
**Theta Alpha**	August 6, 2019	University of Delaware	Newark	Delaware	Active	(Note: The chapter started as a colony in 2017 and was chartered in 2019. It was installed on August 6, 2021.)
**Eta Psi**	April 18, 2021	The College of New Jersey	Ewing	New Jersey	Active	(Note: The chapter started as a colony in 2016 and was chartered in 2019. It was installed on April 14, 2021.)
**Theta Beta**	April 2, 2022	Sacred Heart University	Fairfield	Connecticut	Active	(Note: The chapter started as a colony in 2017. It was chartered in 2021 and installed on April 2, 2022.)
**Theta Gamma**	February 25, 2022	James Madison University	Harrisonburg	Virginia	Active	(Note: The chapter started as a colony in 2018.)
**Theta Eta**	March 26, 2022	Florida Gulf Coast University	Fort Myers	Florida	Active	(Note: The chapter started as a colony in 2017.)
**Theta Theta**	2023	Embry–Riddle Aeronautical University, Daytona Beach	Daytona Beach	Florida	Active	
**Theta Iota**	2025	Appalachian State University	Boone	North Carolina	Active	
**Theta Kappa**	2025	Louisiana State University	Baton Rouge	Louisiana	Active	(Note: While established in 2015 as a colony, the LSU group didn't petition for its charter for a full decade, instead, operating as a colony for that period. For Beta Theta Pi, a 5-10 year gap between colonization and chartering is unusual, but not unprecedented.)
**Theta Lambda**	2021	Boise State University	Boise	Idaho	Active	(Note: Colony was established in 2021.)
	2021	Kennesaw State University	Kennesaw	Georgia	Colony	
	2025	Temple University	Philadelphia	Pennsylvania	Colony	(Note: Colony was established in 2025.)
	2025	Mississippi State University	Starkville	Mississippi	Colony	(Note: Colony was established in 2025.)
	2025	University of New Hampshire	Durham	New Hampshire	Colony	(Note: Colony was established in 2025.)

|}
