= Alpha Sigma Chi =

North American collegiate fraternity

- ΑΣΧ
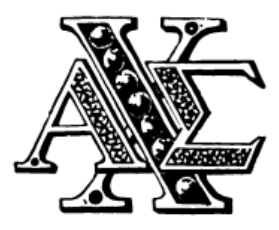
- Alpha Sigma Chi badge
- Founded: October 10, 1871; 155 years ago Rutgers University
- Type: Social
- Affiliation: Independent
- Status: Merged
- Merge date: October 22, 1879
- Successor: Beta Theta Pi
- Scope: North America
- Colors: Purple and Gold
- Chapters: 7
- Members: 223 lifetime
- Headquarters: United States

Alpha Sigma Chi (ΑΣΧ) was a North American social fraternity that was founded in 1874 at Rutgers University. It established seven chapters before merging with Beta Theta Pi in 1879.

== History ==
Alpha Sigma Chi originally began as a pre-collegiate organization called S.A.C. at the Blair Academy, a preparatory school at Blairstown, New Jersey. The friends who founded S.A.C included Louis la Tourette, who died while attending Lafayette College; Elbridge Van Syckel, who went to Rutgers; and Ellis D. Thompson, who went to Cornell University.

Van Syckel continued the group sub rosa at Rutgers College as Alpha Sigma Chi, starting on October 10, 1871. Alpha Sigma Chi was openly formed at Rutgers in 1874 by Van Syckel, Charles Washburg, and William Watson. Thompson founded the Beta chapter of Alpha Sigma Chi at Cornell University in February 1874.

Gamma chapter at Stevens Institute of Technology was formed in February 1875. Delta at Princeton College was started sub rosa in June 1875; it soon became inactive but was revived in 1876, only to become inactive again by 1879 due to anti-fraternity policies. Epsilon chapter at St. Lawrence University was formed by absorbing a local literary society called the Five Liars and, then, the P. D. social club in the fall of 1875. Zeta chapter was started in May 1877 at Columbia College, but was expelled by the fraternity in the fall of 1878 for "philosophical" reasons. Eta chapter at Maine State College of Agriculture and the Mechanic Arts was established in 1878 from the local group, E. C. Society.

Alpha Sigma Chi held meetings of its Grand Chapter at national conventions that rotated between hosting chapters. Chapters also help on-campus reunions for their alumni. Its fifth annual national convention was held on December 28, 1876 in Hoboken, New Jersey; five chapters were represented and reviewed applications for two new chapters. Its seventh convention was hosted by Gamma at the Stevens Institute of Technology on December 26, 1878. However, by the 1878–1879 academic year, the fraternity was failing and began exploring possible mergers under the leadership of member William Raimond Baird, the fraternity's secretary.

Alpha Sigma Chi held its eighth national convention in Ithaca, New York on October 21–23, 1879. As part of the convention, the fraternity met with representatives of the national fraternity, Beta Theta Pi. The merger of the two fraternities was ratified on October 22, 1879 in Ithaca, making Beta Theta Pi the largest fraternity in the United States. In 1879, before the merger, Alpha Sigma Chi had initiated 223 members.

Baird revived the Zeta chapter at Columbia in 1881 as the Alpha Alpha chapter of Beta Theta Pi.

== Symbols ==
Alpha Sigma Chi's badge was originally a Maltese cross but was changed to a jeweled monogram of the Greek letters ΑΣΧ. Its colors were purple and gold. Its song was the "Alpha Sigma Chi Waltz", composed by Professor J. B. Livingston and published by Oliver Ditson & Co. in 1877. The fraternity also self-published a volume of its songs. It did not have print publication.

== Chapters ==
The chapters of Alpha Sigma Chi follow.

Chapter	Charter date and range	Institution	Location	Status	Ref.
Alpha	October 10, 1871 – October 21, 1879	Rutgers College	New Brunswick, New Jersey	Merged (ΒΘΠ)	(Note: The chapter formed and operated sub rosa until 1874. It became the Beta Gamma chapter of Beta Theta Pi after the national merger of the two fraternities.)
Beta	February 1874 – October 21, 1879	Cornell University	Ithaca, New York	Merged (ΒΘΠ)	(Note: Became the Beta Delta chapter of Beta Theta Pi after the national merger of the two fraternities.)
Gamma	February 1875 – October 21, 1879	Stevens Institute of Technology	Hoboken, New Jersey	Merged (ΒΘΠ)	(Note: Became the Sigma chapter of Beta Theta Pi after the national merger of the two fraternities.)
Delta	June 1875–1875, 1876–1879	Princeton College	Princeton, New Jersey	Inactive	(Note: The chapter was went inactive due to anti-fraternity policies.)
Epsilon	1876 – October 21, 1879	St. Lawrence University	Canton, New York	Merged (ΒΘΠ)	(Note: Chapter formed from Five Liars (local), established in 1871. Later, it absorbed the P. D., a local social society. It became the Beta Zeta chapter of Beta Theta Pi after the national merger of the two fraternities.)
Zeta	1877–1878	Columbia College	New York City, New York	Inactive	(Note: The chapter was expelled for "philosophical" reasons. It was revived in 1881 as the Alpha Alpha chapter of Beta Theta Pi.)
Eta	June 24, 1878 – October 21, 1879	Maine State College of Agriculture and the Mechanic Arts	Orono, Maine	Merged (ΒΘΠ)	(Note: Chapter formed from the Eternal Companions Society or E. C. Society (local), established on September 25, 1875. It became the Beta Eta chapter of Beta Theta Pi after the national merger of the two fraternities.)

== Notable members ==
- William Raimond Baird (Gamma), attorney, publisher, author, and president of the New York Corresponding School of Law
- Henry Bernard Carpenter (Eta, honorary), Unitarian clergyman, orator, author, and poet
- William T. Haines (Eta), Governor of Maine, Maine Senate, and Maine Attorney General
- Hattori Ichizo (Alpha), president of Kyoritsu Women's University and governor of Hiroshima Prefecture, Iwate Prefecture, Nagasaki Prefecture, and Hyōgo Prefecture
- Frederic Schiller Lee (Epsilon), physiologist at Columbia University's College of Physicians and Surgeons
- John Clarence Lee (Epsilon), president of St. Lawrence University and professor and English and vice president of Lombard University
- Philip A. Welker (Beta), civil engineer in charge of the office of the United States Coast and Geodetic Survey who commanded hydrographic surveys of the Atlantic Coast and the coast surveys of the Philippine Islands

== Member misconduct ==
In February 1878, two members of the Princeton chapter, A. H. Atterbury and J. B. Carter, hazed a freshman in his dorm room, including stripping him, cutting his hair, and spanking him. In retaliation, ten freshmen, calling themselves the Ku Klux, dressed in Black face and carried revolvers and ropes to the rooms of Atterbury and Carter who were gagged, tied, and beaten. When the two fraternity members refused to sign an apology letter to the freshman class, they were stripped, spanked with a paddle, and "scalped", meaning their heads were shaved except for a topknot. The Ku Klux left after the two did not sign the letter. Once freed by another student, Atterbury and Carter pursued the Ku Klux and, aiming their guns, demanded that the freshman halt. When the Ku Klux fled, Atterbury fired his revolver that contained blank cartridges; the Ku Klux returned fire and shot Atterbury. The Ku Klux scattered and Atterbury was taken to a doctor who removed a ball from his hip.

When the hazing incident took place, Princeton officials believed Alpha Sigma Chi was inactive, but it had been operating sub rosa. At the time, Princeton students were known to carry and frequently fire their guns, but it was a violation of "college usage" to fire at someone after being hazed. The college's president stated that the guilty parties would be expelled, but Atterbury and Carter refused to provide the names of their attackers.
