= John Clarence Lee =

American academic administrator (1856–1940)

- Born: October 15, 1856; Woodstock, Vermont, US
- Died: September 16, 1940 (aged 83); Cambridge, Massachusetts, US
- Occupations: University president and minister

Academic background
- Education: St. Lawrence University, A.B. 1876 Harvard University, A.B. 1878; St. Lawrence University, M.A. Divinity 1880 Tufts University, S.T.D. 1896

John Clarence Lee (October 15, 1856 – September 16, 1940) was an American minister, academic, author, and university president. He was the president of St. Lawrence University and Lombard University. He was the pastor of the Universalist Church of the Restoration in Philadelphia, Pennsylvania for nineteen years

== Early life and education ==
John Clarence Lee was born on October 15, 1856, in South Woodstock, Vermont. He was the son of Elmina (née Bennett) and John Stebbins Lee, a minister with the Universalist General Convention and the first president of St. Lawrence University. His mother was a teacher and artist. He was one of five children.

Lee's primary education was in local schools. He attended St. Lawrence University, where he received an A.B. in 1876. While there, he was a member of Alpha Sigma Chi fraternity (later part of Beta Theta Pi) and Phi Beta Kappa. He enrolled as a senior at Harvard University in 1877, graduating with an A.B. degree in 1878.

In 1880, he received a Master's of Arts in divinity from the St. Lawrence University's Canton Theological School. He received an honorary Ph.D. from St. Lawrence University in 1895. In 1896, he received a Doctor of Sacred Theology (STD) from Tufts University.

== Career ==
In 1876, Lee taught science at the Dean Academy in Franklin, Massachusetts for one year. He was ordained as a Universalist General Convention minister at Perry, New York in 1881. He was a pastor at the Universalist Church in Perry from 1880 to 1883, followed by a position with the church in Albans, Vermont from 1883 to 1884.

In September 1884, Lee became an English literature and homiletics professor at the Ryder Divinity School of Lombard University and was later head of its theology department. He was elected Lombard's president in August 1892 but resigned after a few months to become its vice president for four years. In June 1896, he became the fifth president of St. Lawrence University. He was inaugurated on June 23, 1896. During his tenure as president, Lee enlarged the endowment, curriculum, and the number of students. He also oversaw construction of the college's first gymnasium and the formation of its first football team.

Lee left the university in 1899. On September 1, 1900, he became the pastor of the Universalist Church of the Restoration in Philadelphia, Pennsylvania for nineteen years. He was a secretary of the Liberal Religious Congress in 1909. In 1910, he was a delegate to the Congress of Liberal Religion in Berlin, Germany. Next, he was the pastor of the Gloucester Unitarian Universalist Church in Gloucester, Massachusetts from 1919 until his retirement as pastor-emeritus in 1929. This was the founding church of the Universalist General Convention.

From 1932 to 1934, he worked as an interim pastor in Stamford, Connecticut. He was also an author, writing The Beginning of St. Lawrence University, An Estimate of Bryant, The Higher Criticism, The Spirit of God in Man, and The Mission of the College.

== Personal life ==
On November 25, 1889, Lee married Helena Crumett of Hyde Park, Boston, Massachusetts. They had five children: Cuthbert Lee, Dorothy Lee, Constance Lee, Janet Lee, and Roland Lee. The couple traveled overseas in 1893 and 1912. In 1929, after his retirement, the couple spent two years traveling around the world, including staying eight months in Tasmania with their daughter Constance.

Lee was the president of the Cape Ann Historical Association and president of the Associated Charities in Gloucester, Massachusetts. He was a member of the Loyal Order of Moose.

Lee died at his sister's home in Cambridge, Massachusetts on September 16, 1940, at the age of 83 years.
