= Scientific Lazzaroni =

The Scientific Lazzaroni is a self-mocking name adopted by Alexander Dallas Bache and his group of scientists who flourished before and up to the American Civil War. ("Lazzaroni" was slang for the homeless idlers of Naples who live by chance work or begging - so called from the Hospital of St Lazarus, which served as their refuge.) These scientists then gained greater support and laid the foundation for the National Academy of Sciences. However, the National Academy did not solve the problems facing a nation plunged in Civil War – as the Lazzaroni had hoped, nor did it centralize American scientific efforts.

These Lazzaroni were mostly professional physical scientists, interested in geophysical problems, who admitted a few kindred souls from other fields to their ranks. Their interests and range of influence extended to all of the sciences and included much of the research performed in universities and the government. They were consciously promoting the development of a professional scientific community in America.

The Lazzaroni in the United States actually existed in the 1850s and a little before, though the name was not always the same as the group changed and grew.

The Lazzaroni wanted to mimic the autocratic academic structures of European universities. The members of the Lazzaroni wanted only university-educated scientists, at one point, so as to create a "pure science" for America. Therefore, the scientists who did not match the code and "oath" of the initial members would be forced, if possible, out of their vocation and not allowed to advance unless they met the qualifications of the Lazzaroni, who often kept scientists out of any professional scientific position. They used their influence together, a group of top scientists against any one individual.

The following is a partial list of Lazzaroni and their opponents.

== The (American) Lazzaroni ==
- Alexander Dallas Bache (1806–1867)
- Benjamin Peirce (1809–1880)
- Louis Agassiz (1807–1873)
- Joseph Henry (1797–1878)
- Oliver Wolcott Gibbs (1822–1908)
- Charles Henry Davis (1807–1877)
- Benjamin Apthorp Gould (1824–1896)
- John Fries Frazer (1812–1872)
- James Dwight Dana (1813–1895)
- Cornelius Conway Felton (1807–1862)

== Friends of the Lazzaroni ==
- James Hall (paleontologist) (1811–1898)
- Senator Henry Wilson (1812–1875)
- Jefferson Davis (1808–1889) — close friend of Bache (since West Point) and Joseph Henry (of the Smithsonian). Bache did not like Maury working near the area which Bache regarded as his own, the Coast Survey. However, due to persistent shipwrecks along the coast, Maury was ordered to create charts. After his charts were widely available, the losses were greatly reduced. Bache became jealous and was determined to get revenge. Davis was a Regent of the Smithsonian for several years (1847, 1851; 1853-57 as Secretary of War); the Institution clashed with the Naval Observatory over using its endowment funds for professional scientific advancements. In 1857 Davis re-entered the Senate; his great abilities were admired both by Bache and by Smithsonian Secretary Henry. These three powerful men, Henry, Davis and Bache were pitted against Maury – including during the Civil War. Davis became CSA President and Maury was under his command.

== The Opposition ==
- Asa Gray (1810–1888)
- William Barton Rogers (1804–1882)
- Charles William Eliot (1834–1926)
- Matthew Fontaine Maury (1806–1873)

== The Neutrals ==
- Joseph Leidy (1823–1891)
- John William Draper (1811–1882)
- Spencer Fullerton Baird (1823–1887)

== Sources ==
- Nathan Reingold, Science in Nineteenth-Century America (1964)
- Frances Leigh Williams Mathew Fontaine Maury; Scientist of the Sea (1963) by Rutgers, The State University Library of Congress Catalogue Card Number: 63-10564
- The Lazzaroni: science and scientists in mid-nineteenth-century America. Library of Congress Cataloging in Publication Data Miller, Lillian B.
- Axel Jansen, Alexander Dallas Bache: Building the American Nation through Science and Education in the Nineteenth Century (2011).
- The Nuttall Encyclopædia (various entries)
