= Philip A. Welker =

American civil engineer (1857–1926)

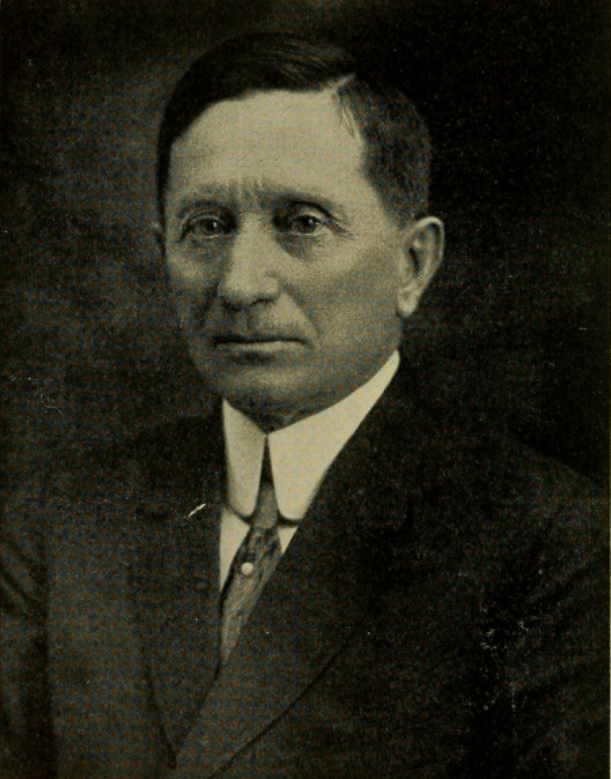
- Born: Philip Albert Welker; June 1, 1857; Toledo, Ohio, US
- Died: December 24, 1926 (aged 69); Washington, D.C., US
- Education: Cornell University
- Occupations: Civil engineer, hydrographer, and geodetic engineer
- Employer: United States Coast and Geodetic Survey

Philip Albert Welker (June 1, 1857 – December 24, 1926) was an American geodetic engineer, hydrographer, and civil engineer. He spent his entire 42-year career with the United States Coast and Geodetic Survey and oversaw surveys of the Atlantic Coast of the United States, the Gulf of Mexico, and the Philippines.

== Early life ==
Welker was born in Toledo, Ohio, on June 1, 1857. He graduated from Cornell University with a bachelor of civil engineering degree in June 1878. While there, he was a member of Alpha Sigma Chi fraternity (later part of Beta Theta Pi).

== Career ==
In 1879, Welker was appointed to the United States Coast and Geodetic Survey, eventually rising to the rank of captain. In 1879, he worked on triangulation in Missouri. He worked on a hydrographic survey of Baltimore Harbor in 1880, followed by work on the Chesapeake Bay. From 1880 to 1890, he completed triangulation work in Arkansas, Idaho, Illinois, and Tennessee.

In 1881, he was assigned to California, where he conducted a hydrographic survey of San Francisco Bay. In 1882, he conducted an astronomical study of the movement of Venus across the moon. He also documented solar eclipse in San Francisco, California in 1886. In May 1889, he chartered and sounded Lake Pontchartrain in Louisiana, a project that took three winter surveying seasons. He also charted several rivers in Louisiana and Florida. He commanded the steamer Blake, with a civilian crew. In 1893, he completed triangulation work on the Alaska boundary.

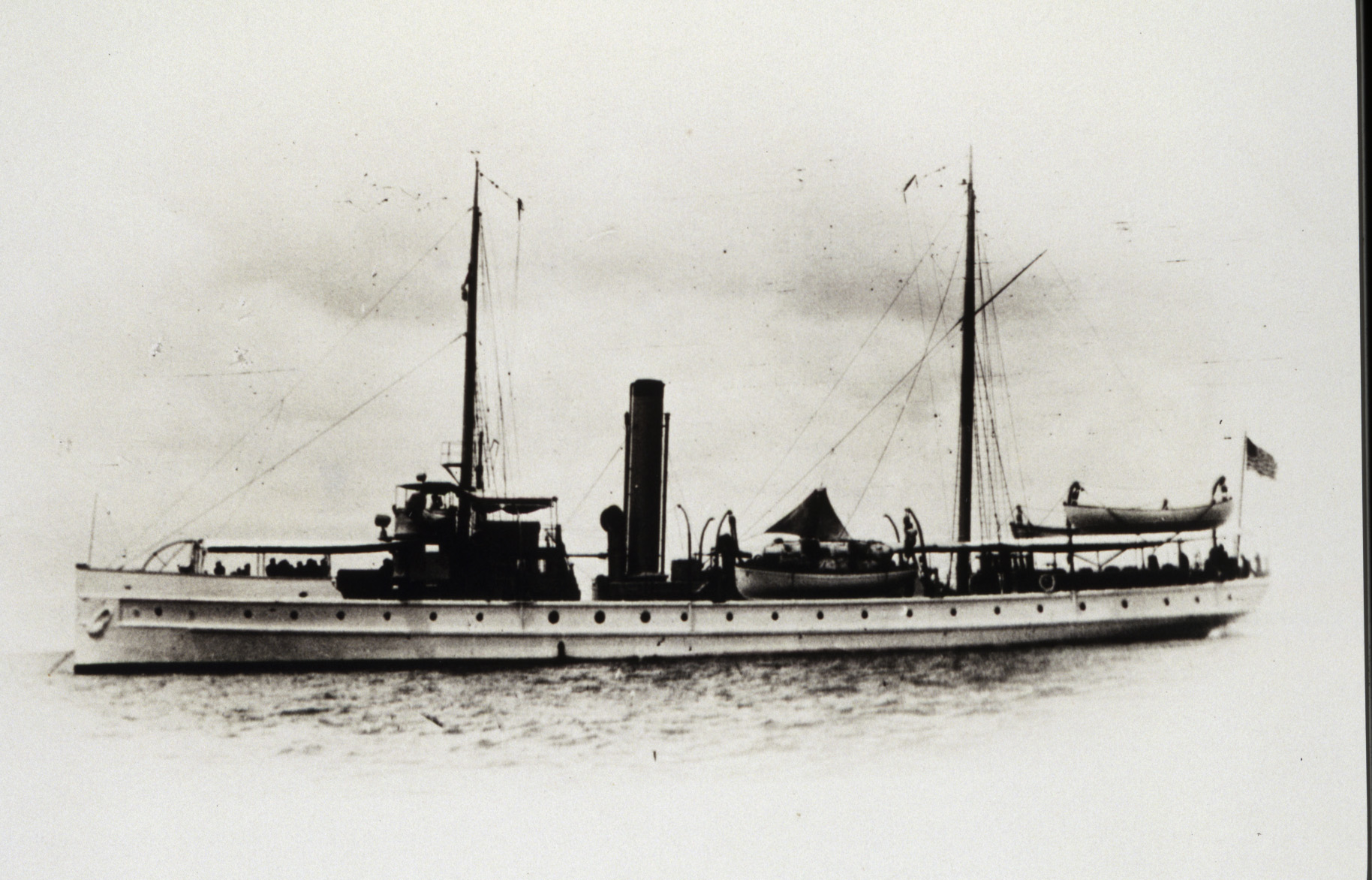
USC&GS A. D. Bache (1901) in 1922.

He commanded the USC&GS A. D. Bache (1871) and its replacement, the USC&GS A. D. Bache (1901), conducting hydrographic surveys of the Atlantic Coast of the United States and the Gulf of Mexico from 1898 to January 9, 1909. He also conducted surveys of the coasts of Puerto Rico and the Isthmus of Panama, allowing the United States to publish the first complete navigation charts of these areas. He also completed triangulation in California, British Columbia, and the Territory of Washington.

He was the director of the coastal surveys in the Philippine Islands and the director of the sub-office of the United States Coast and Geodetic Survey in Manila from 1911 to 1914. He was the secretary of the Philippine Committee on Geographic Names and was a member of the Harbor Lines Commission of the Philippine Islands.

When Welker returned to the United States in 1914, he became the assistant director of the office of the United States Coast and Geodetic Survey. He remained in the Washington, D.C. office, becoming hydrographic and geodetic engineer in 1917 and a personnel officer in 1920. He retired on June 1, 1921.

He was a member of the American Society of Civil Engineers and the Washington Society of Engineers.

== Honors ==
In 1923, Mount Welker in the Prince of Wales–Hyder Census Area, Alaska on the Alaska-Canadian border was named in his honor.

== Personal life ==
Welker married Maude B. Loud of Abington, Massachusetts on March 17, 1885, in Oakland, California. She died in April 1890.

Gertrude May Lanahan of Baltimore, Maryland on June 29, 1904. They had a son and a daughter.

He was a member of the Cosmos Club, the Federal Club of Washington, D.C., the Philippine Club in New York City, and the University Club of Manila. He was a member of the Knights Templar and was a 32nd degree Freemason. He also belonged to St. John's Episcopal Church in Washington, D.C.

He died December 24, 1926, at his home in Washington, D.C., at the age of sixty years. He was buried in Toledo, Ohio.
