= Alexander Dallas Bache Monument =

Memorial in Washington, D.C.

Coordinates: 38.8813°N 76.9806°W

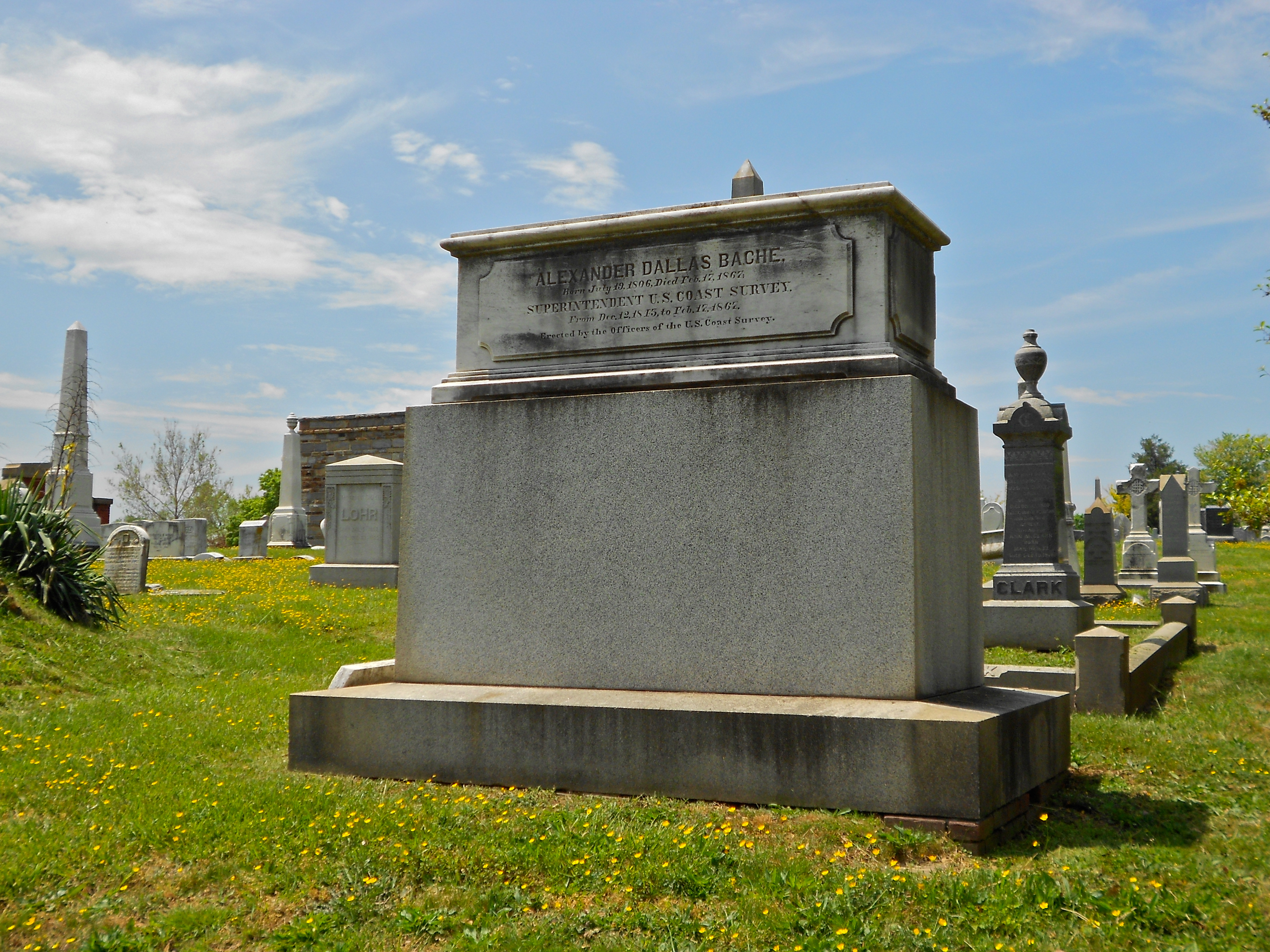
- Artist: Henry Hobson Richardson
- Year: 1868
- Location: Washington, D.C., United States
- Owner: Christ Church

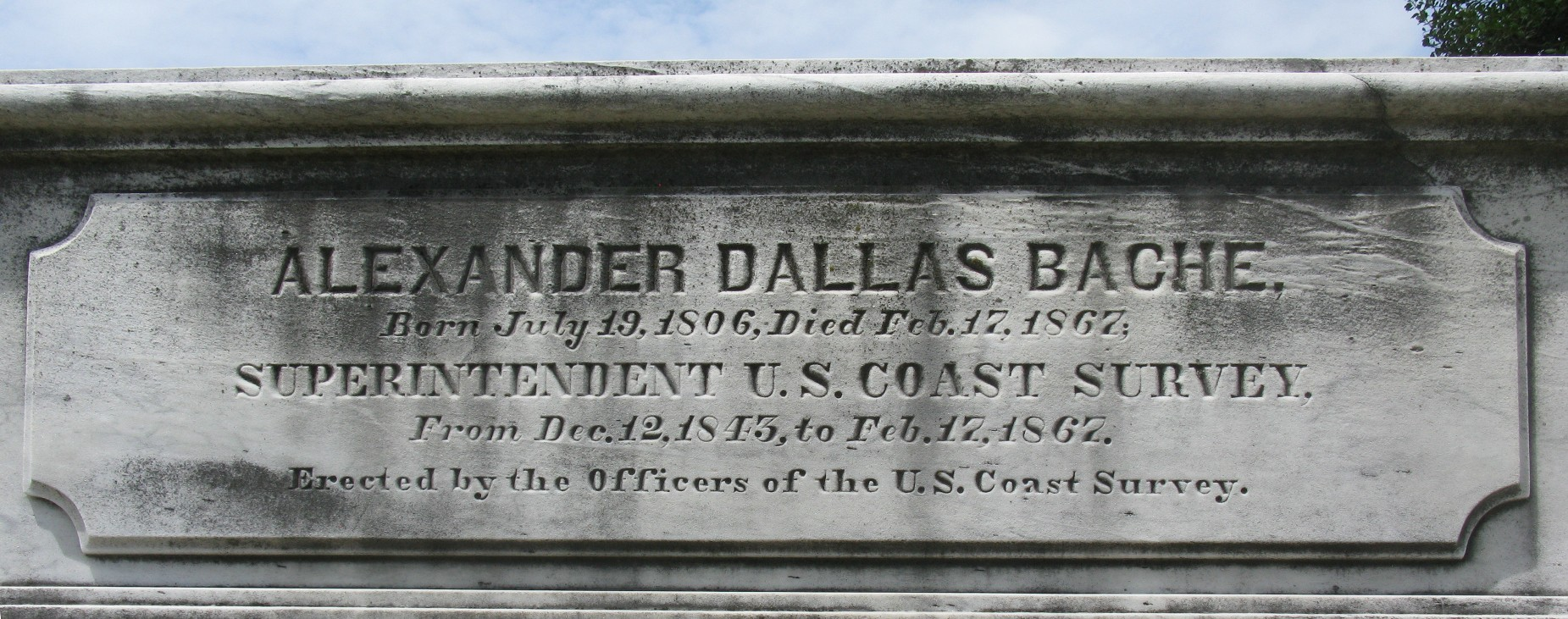
The memorial plaque of the monument

The Alexander Dallas Bache Monument is the tomb of Alexander Dallas Bache, a noted American scientist and surveyor. Bache died in Newport, Rhode Island in 1867 and was transported to Washington, DC's Congressional Cemetery for burial. American architect Henry Hobson Richardson was commissioned to build a tomb in 1868. The tomb is one of only three examples of a monument designed by Richardson and a rare example of a Richardson structure lacking Romanesque design points.
