= Alexander Dallas Bache =

American scientist (1806–1867)

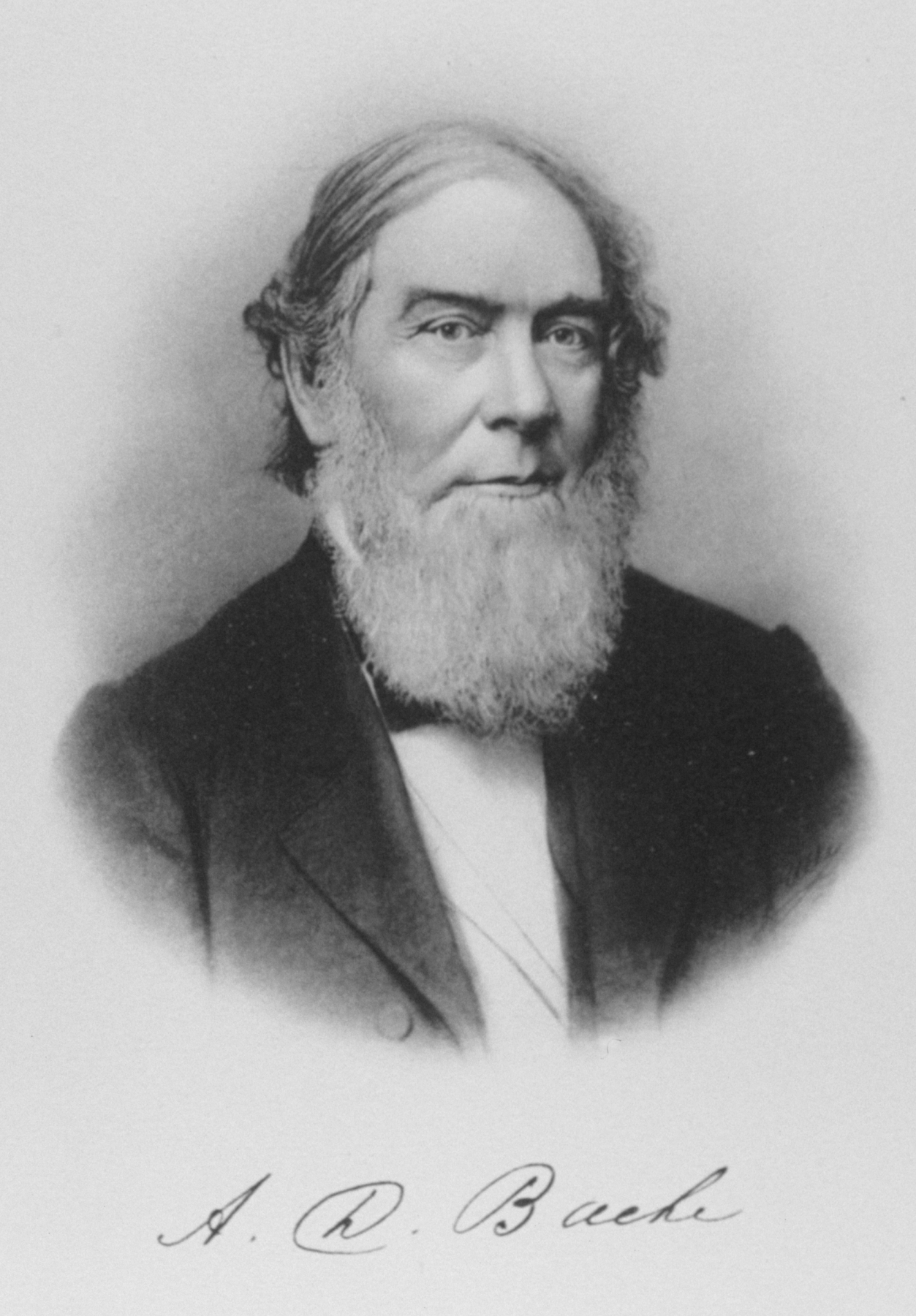
- A 19th century illustration of Bache and his signature

6th Superintendent of the United States Coast Survey
- In office 1843–1867
- President: James K. Polk; Zachary Taylor; Millard Fillmore; Franklin Pierce; James Buchanan; Abraham Lincoln; Andrew Johnson
- Preceded by: Ferdinand Rudolph Hassler
- Succeeded by: Benjamin Peirce

1st President of the National Academy of Sciences
- In office 1863–1867
- Succeeded by: Joseph Henry

Personal details
- Born: July 19, 1806 Philadelphia, Pennsylvania, U.S.
- Died: February 17, 1867 (aged 60) Newport, Rhode Island, U.S.
- Resting place: Congressional Cemetery
- Spouse: Nancy Clark Fowler
- Children: 1
- Scientific career
- Education: US Military Academy
- Known for: coastal mapping project
- Fields: Physics
- Workplaces: University of Pennsylvania

Alexander Dallas Bache (/ˈbiːtʃ/ BEECH; July 19, 1806 – February 17, 1867) was an American physicist, scientist, and surveyor who erected coastal fortifications and conducted a detailed survey to map the mideastern United States coastline. Originally an army engineer, he later became Superintendent of the United States Coast Survey, and built it into the foremost scientific institution in the country before the American Civil War.

== Early life and education ==
Bache was born in Philadelphia, the son of Richard Bache, Jr., and Sophia Burrell Dallas Bache. He came from a family prominent in American politics. He was the nephew of Vice-President George M. Dallas and naval hero Alexander J. Dallas, the grandson of Secretary of the Treasury Alexander Dallas, and the great-grandson of Benjamin Franklin.

== Career ==
=== United States Army ===
After graduating from the United States Military Academy at West Point in 1825, as first in his class, he was an assistant professor of engineering there for some time. As a second lieutenant in the United States Army Corps of Engineers, he was engaged in the construction of Fort Adams in Newport, Rhode Island. Bache resigned from the Army on June 1, 1829.

=== University of Pennsylvania ===
Bache was a professor of natural philosophy and chemistry at the University of Pennsylvania from 1828 to 1841 and again from 1842 to 1843. He spent 1836–1838 in Europe on behalf of the trustees of what became Girard College; he was named president of the college after his return. Abroad, he examined European education systems, and on his return he published a valuable report. From 1839 to 1842, he served as the first president of Central High School of Philadelphia, one of the oldest public high schools in the United States.

=== U.S. Coast Survey ===
In 1843, on the death of Professor Ferdinand Rudolph Hassler, Bache was appointed superintendent of the United States Coast Survey. Whereas Hassler had faced continual doubts from Congress, Bache succeeded in convincing legislators of the value of geodesy in addition to geomagnetic and meteorological research. With many contacts, friends, and family among the nation's political and military leaders, Bache won liberal appropriations to build up his agency and greatly expand its work. By the mid 1850s it had become the federal government's leading scientific bureau. In 1849, it began study of the Pacific Coast, which the US had newly acquired via the US-Mexico War and Oregon Treaty. Assisted by Isaac Stevens, his number two in Washington, DC, Bache reorganized the Coast Survey so that it could complete initial mapping of the entire US coast.

=== Scientific leadership and the "Lazzaroni" ===
By the 1840s, a clique of leading US scientists began to coalesce around Bache with the goal of professionalizing their fields. They formalized with establishment of the Association of American Geologists and Naturalists in 1843 (renamed the American Association for the Advancement of Science five years later) and the Smithsonian Institution in 1846. Informally, Bache and his circle called themselves the Scientific Lazzaroni. Together, the groups created and enforced standards of intellectual merit with the goal of elevating the nation and its reputation. This meant discrediting charlatans but, at times, also denying research funding or academic appointments to others. Perhaps most important, the groups advised and even mentored politicians and army engineers. Bache would lead the AAAS until 1851 and serve on the Smithsonian's board of regents throughout his term as Coast Survey superintendent.

In 1863, amid the demands of the Civil War, Bache was a central figure in the establishment of the National Academy of Sciences, created by an act of Congress to provide scientific advice to the federal government. He was elected its first president and served in that role until his death in 1867.

=== Civil War and later life ===
As the sectional crisis worsened through the late 1850s, Coast Survey budgets became ensnared by polarization and conflicts in Congress. Then, the start of war in 1861 brought a stop to work along the South's Atlantic and Gulf coasts. Bache withdrew Survey ships from the region so they would not fall into secessionists' hands. At the same time, some staff resigned to join the Confederacy. A number of trusted friends and Democratic allies, including senators Jefferson Davis and Stephen Mallory, would lead the rebellion — acts that Bache took as both political and personal treachery.

Yet the Civil War enhanced the Coast Survey's stature in Washington, D.C. By this time, the agency had amassed charts of southern harbors, rivers, and coastal terrain. The research gave a critical advantage to the Union navy and army. Meanwhile, Bache continued to lead scientists to greater influence in government, helping to establish the U.S. Sanitary Commission. He also played a central role in the founding of the National Academy of Sciences in 1863 and served as its first president.

Official duties and private worries contributed to Bache's declining health. By 1864 he had suffered a stroke, which left him handicapped and unable to work without his wife's assistance. At the time of his death, he had served as head of the Coast Survey for 24 years.

== Awards and honors ==
- Elected a member of the American Philosophical Society in 1829.
- Elected an Associate Fellow of the American Academy of Arts and Sciences in 1845.
- Elected a Fellow of the Royal Society of Edinburgh on March 15, 1858,
- Elected Foreign Member of the Royal Society on May 24, 1860.

After the Civil War, Bache was elected a 3rd Class Companion of the Military Order of the Loyal Legion of the United States (MOLLUS) in consideration of his contributions to the war effort.

== Personal life ==
He married Nancy Clark Fowler on September 30, 1838, in Newport, Rhode Island. She was born in Newport and died on January 13, 1870, in Philadelphia. She assisted in the publication of much of his work. They adopted one son, Henry Wood Bache (1839–1878).

== Death ==
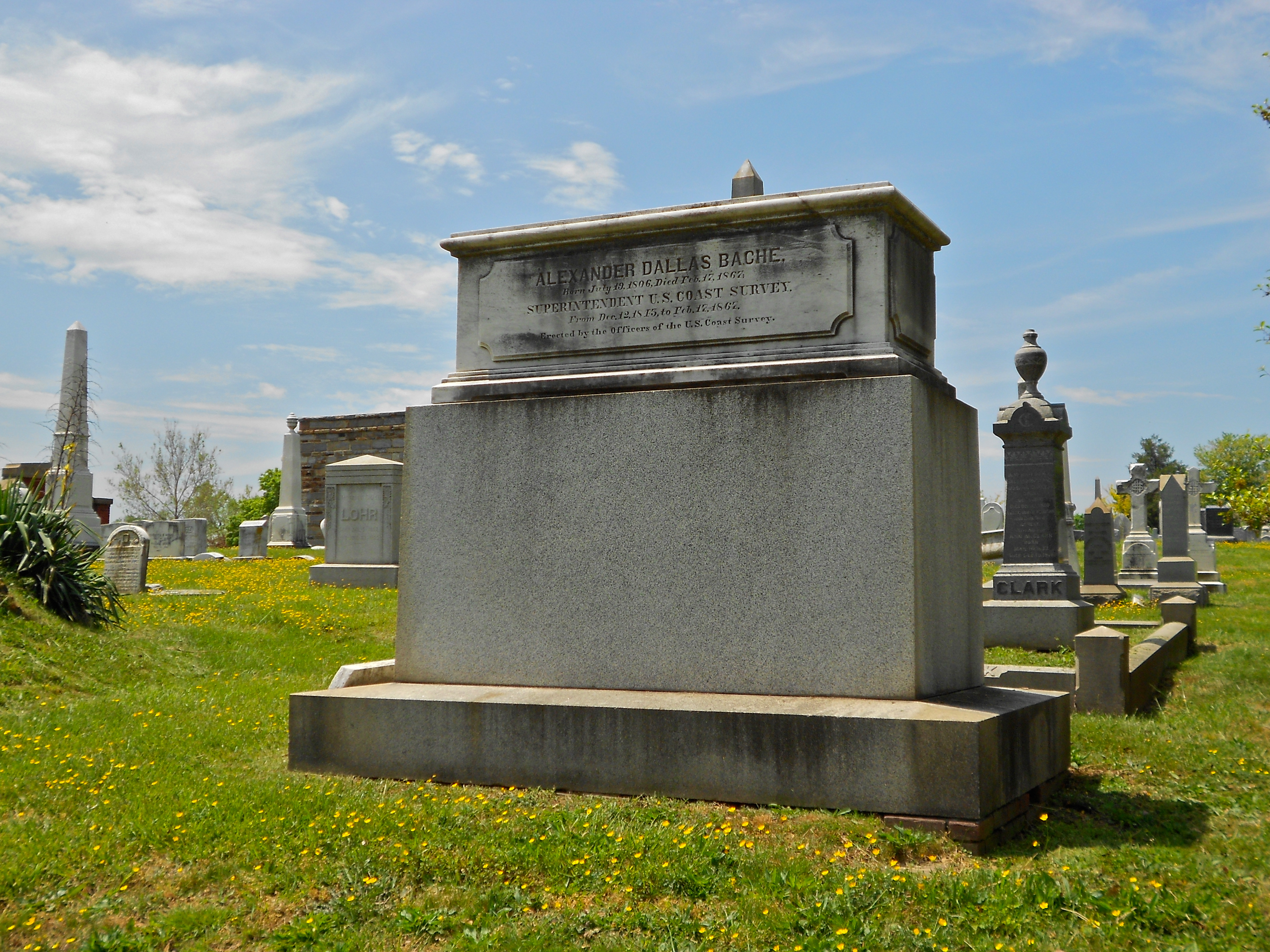
Bache's gravesite at Congressional Cemetery in Washington, D.C.

He died at Newport, Rhode Island on February 17, 1867, from cerebral softening. He was buried in the Congressional Cemetery in Washington, D.C., under a monument designed by architect Henry Hobson Richardson.

== Legacy ==
- Two survey ships were named for him, the A. D. Bache of 1871 and its successor in 1901.
- The cydippid ctenophore Pleurobrachia bachei A. Agassiz, 1860 was named for him; it was discovered in 1859 by Alexander Agassiz who was working as an engineer on a ship surveying the United States-Canada border between Washington state and British Columbia.
- Bache-Martin School, a public elementary school in Philadelphia, has its 5th-8th grade building named after him.

== See also ==
- Alexander Dallas Bache Monument, Bache's gravesite in the Congressional Cemetery in Washington, D.C.
- Alexander Dallas Bache School in Philadelphia
- Alexander Bache U.S. Coast Survey Line
- Richard Bache, Bache's paternal grandfather and son-in-law of Benjamin Franklin
- Richard Bache, Jr., Bache's father
- Sarah Franklin Bache, Bache's paternal grandmother and daughter of Benjamin Franklin

== Notes ==
Government offices
Preceded by Ferdinand Rudolph Hassler	6th Superintendent, United States Coast Survey; 1843–1867	Succeeded by Benjamin Peirce
Professional and academic associations
New office	1st President of the National Academy of Sciences; 1863 – 1867	Succeeded by Joseph Henry
