= Henry Bernard Carpenter =

Irish Ubitarian clergyman and writer

- Born: April 22, 1840; Dublin, Ireland
- Died: July 17, 1890 (aged 50); Sorrento, Maine, United States
- Spouse: Emma Bailey (m.1878–90; his death)
- Children: 1
- Writing career
- Notable works: The Oatmeal Crusaders, Being a Serio-comic poem

Henry Bernard Carpenter (April 22, 1840 – July 17, 1890), was an Irish Unitarian clergyman, orator, author, and poet. Educated at Oxford University, his written works were principally in verse, three of which were published, The Oatmeal Crusaders, or A Nine Days' Wander Round, Up and Down Mount Washington, Being a Serio-comic Poem (1875), Liber amoris, Being the Book of Love of Brother Aurelius (1886), and A Poet's Last Songs (1891) published posthumously.

== Personal ==
Carpenter was a son of the Reverend Henry Carpenter, perpetual curate of St Michael's Church, Aigburth, Liverpool, at his death in 1864, and his wife Hester Boyd, of Derry, sister of Archibald Boyd, Dean of Exeter. His brother was William Boyd Carpenter, the Anglican Bishop of Ripon. With father, uncle, and brother in the established church, Henry Bernard Carpenter also made a life as a cleric, but within the Unitarian Church rather than Anglicanism.He married Emma Bailey in 1878, and had a son named Henry in 1882.

=== Death ===
Carpenter died on July 17, 1890, at the age of 50, he was survived by his wife and his 8 year old son. Carpenter received tributes from many, including poet and journalist John Boyle O'Reilly (who died less than a month after Carpenter). He was buried in North Bridgton Cemetery.
