= USC&GS A. D. Bache (1871) =

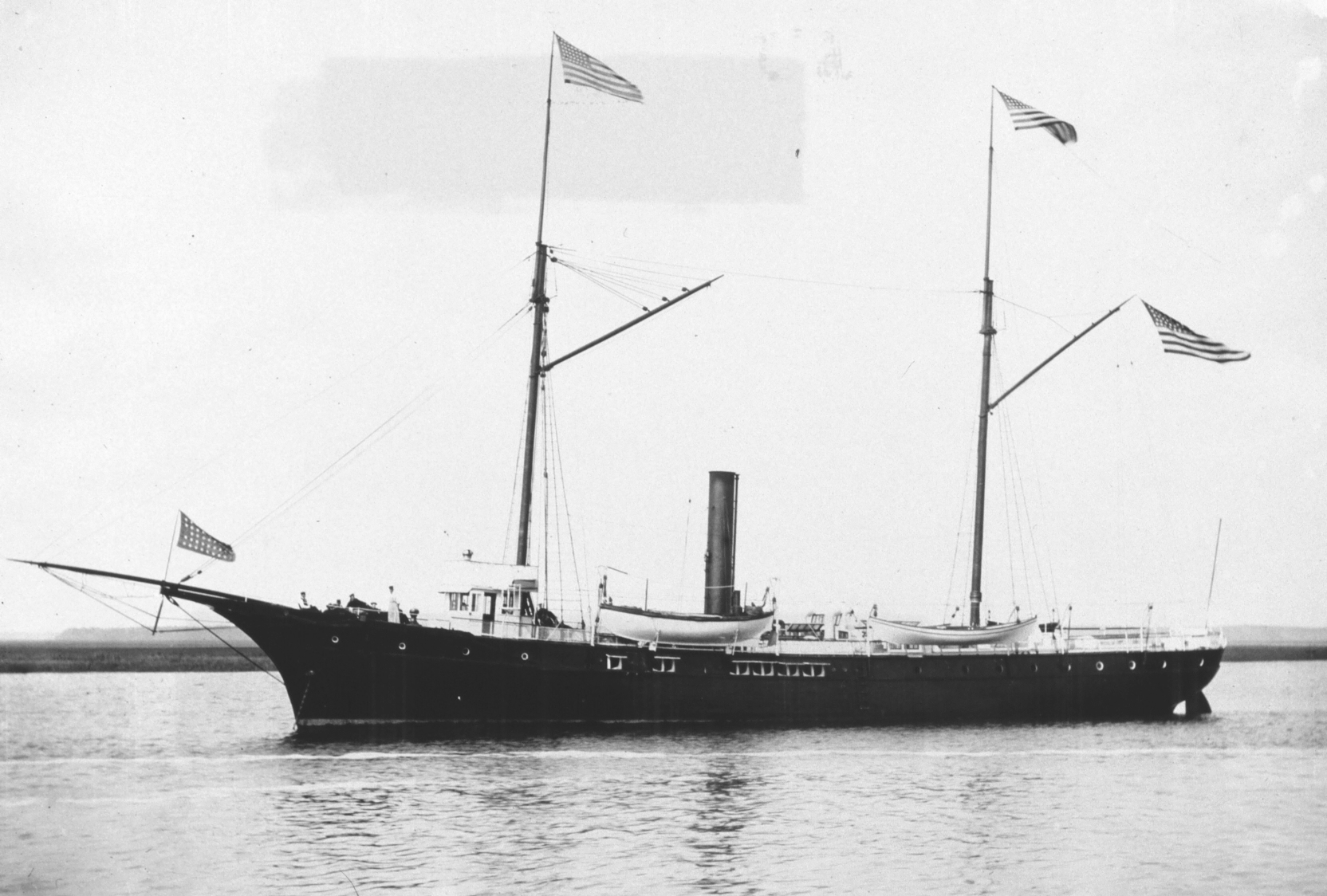
- U.S. Coast and Geodetic Survey ship A.D. Bache, 1889

History

United States
- Name: Alexander D. Bache
- Namesake: Alexander Dallas Bache, former Superintendent of the Coast Survey
- Builder: Harlan and Hollingsworth, Wilmington, Delaware, though Shipbuilding History shows her as hull #92 at Pusey & Jones, Wilmington.
- Launched: 1871
- Out of service: December 19, 1900
- Notes: Records of C&GS mention the ship arriving at Shooters Island, New York to be "rebuilt" when shortly thereafter the same record states an entirely new hull and boiler were built with machinery, instruments and the name transferred to the new hull.

General characteristics
- Tonnage: 182 tons
- Length: 147 ft 8 in (45.01 m)
- Beam: 23 ft 5 in (7.14 m)
- Draught: 10 ft 0 in (3.05 m)
- Propulsion: steam and sail
- Notes: Modern sources, including DANFS and the NOAA ship page, perpetuate identical tonnage and dimensions for the 1871 and 1901 ships. An entirely new hull was built in 1901. Contemporary sources, the annual reports to Congress, clearly specific to the ships of 1871 and 1901 are different and are used.

USC&GS A. D. Bache, the second steamer of the United States Coast and Geodetic Survey, was named for Alexander Dallas Bache, a former superintendent of the Survey. She was launched in August 1871 at Wilmington, Delaware, (Note: The schooner George M. Bache was also operating in 1871. To further confuse names, the Bache of 1871 and Bache of 1901 are confused as one in modern sources including NOAA itself. Contemporary sources show a new hull and boiler were built in 1901 with different dimensions and only some machinery, instruments and name transferred from the old hull to the 1901 hull (See "Fate" for details).) and was in commission from 1871 to 1900.

== Construction ==
Bache was built in Wilmington, Delaware, in 1871. Modern NOAA sources show her built by Harlan and Hollingsworth, while Shipbuilding History shows her as hull #92 at Pusey and Jones. She was a steamer with sail, "two hundred and eighty tons burthen," with later specifications showing "registered tonnage" of 182, 147 ft 8 in (45.01 m) in length, beam 23 ft 5 in (7.14 m) and draft 10 ft 0 in (3.05 m). (Note: Recent sources, including NOAA, treat the hulls of 1871 and 1901 as one while the contemporary sources cited show clear differences.) She was iron framed and wood sheathed.

== Service history ==
The ship was designated for Atlantic and Gulf of Mexico operations with her first mission, under the command of Lieutenant Commander John Adams Howell, USN, (Note: Many of the Survey's officers and men of the period were detached from the U.S. Navy to the Coast and Geodetic Survey under existing law that required hydrography of the Coast Survey be executed by officers and men of the Navy when they can be furnished (Ref: page 3, "Vessels," Report Of The Superintendent of the Coast And Geodetic Survey Showing The Progress Of The Survey During The Year 1874). Typical listing in these reports is as in the case of this officer: "Lieut. Commander John A. Howell, U.S.N., Assistant in the Coast Survey", with "Assistant" being a title for both high office and topographic survey management positions and ship's commanding officers.) being measurements in the Gulf Stream and deep sea soundings in the Gulf of Mexico during trials of the ship.

In addition to making deep sea soundings, the ship engaged in bottom dredging to sample the bottom and obtain biological specimens. During dredging in the Gulf, largely between April 16 and May 19, 1872, the "late Dr. William Stimson," making what appears to be his last trip to sea as he died May 26, 1872, partly directed operations and took charge of the biological samples. The deep dredge sampling along the west coast of Florida was the first to be done in a previously unexplored area. Bache left the Gulf for New York, arriving May 23, for repairs before engaging in hydrographic surveys of Georges Bank off Massachusetts where she anchored on August 22 in thick fog to begin current measuring operations. By September 12 soundings were being made off Cape Sable and, at the request of Spencer F. Baird, authorized by Congress to investigate fishing matters, was making biological dredge casts, the first ocean research for the U.S. Fisheries Commission that is now the National Marine Fisheries Service. Operations, including small boat soundings, were conducted into island and coastal waters including Nantucket.

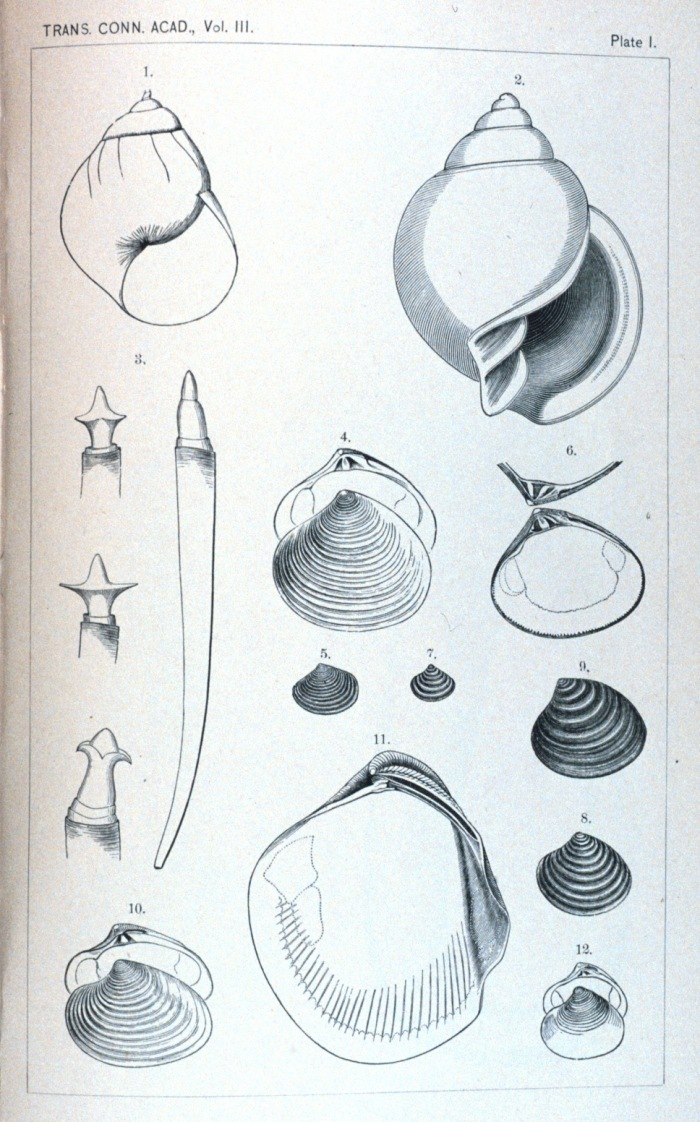
Results of first deep sea dredging cruise conducted by the Commissioner of Fisheries off the Coast Survey Steamer A. D. BACHE. The results of this first deep sea work by the forerunner of today's NMFS was published in: "Report on the Dredgings in the Region of St. George's Banks, in 1872" by S. I. Smith and O. Harger. Trans. of the Connecticut Academy, Vol. III., Part I, 1874.

On December 1, 1872, Bache left New York for the Gulf, reaching Tortugas on January 2, 1873, where the first month was spent erecting and determining the positions of signals to be used during surveys. On May 12 the ship departed for New York recording "11,169 casts of the lead" and 1,500 measured angles. A very strong current was noted in the Gulf Stream during the passage north with recommendations that further observations be made of that "important feature of the Atlantic coast approaches." During the summer of 1873 hydrographic work off the northeast coast, including bottom dredging for the United States Fish Commission, continued despite ongoing boiler problems. On September 2–5, 1873, loss of both boilers in a gale endangered the ship, forcing it to seek shelter under sail in a thick fog. At anchor, the hawser parted on the 5th, but steam had been regained and the ship managed to anchor in the lee of Burnt Island, Maine. On November 8, 1873, the Bache arrived in Baltimore to be refitted with new boilers.

The ship is entirely absent from the annual report ending June 30, 1874, (Note: The "year" covered changed between the 1873 and 1874 reports. The former covered the year "ending November 1, 1873", while the second covered the year "ending June 30, 1874", starting a pattern of July 1-June 30 fiscal year reports. Thus, the 1874 report covers only November 2, 1873, through June 30, 1874. The previous note about the ship arriving in Baltimore on November 8 is outside the period covered, but the report to Congress is dated February 16, 1874.) index or record of surveys, though there is mention of Lieutenant Commander John A. Howell, USN and party making deep soundings between Nova Scotia and Cape Cod. By mid July 1874, Bache was surveying in the vicinity of the Isles of Shoals, under Acting Master Robert Platt, USN, where it discovered the serious hazard of a rock with only 7 feet (2 m) of water over it at low tide. When weather offshore was unfavorable the ship developed the vicinity of the rock and rock ledges nearby with a new bank composed of gravel, broken shells and sand unlike the rocky ledges and extending some 10 miles (16 km). Specimens were taken that might be of interest to Spencer Baird and his fisheries work. In October the ship put into Norfolk, Virginia, to prepare for winter work in the south where triangulation and survey work would take place in the vicinity of the Tortugas. The ship returned to Baltimore for a change of command and in preparation for the northern survey season.

Survey seasons for Bache followed much the same pattern, with summer in the north and winter in the south, until 1876 when emphasis shifted to Florida. The previous northern work was extended, closing the season on September 24, 1875, a period of refitting for southern work that included a detailed harbor entrance survey at Fernandina, Florida, from December 1, 1875, through January 3, 1876, that included mapping a changed shoreline of Cumberland Island. In the fall of 1876 work on the east coast of Florida, between Matanzas Inlet and Mosquito Inlet, was delayed by generally bad weather and an October hurricane that also destroyed shore navigation signals. The survey work continued southward for 1877–1878 and included Cape Canaveral and nearby shoals the following survey season with a return north to refit. During June of that season future rear admiral, then Lieutenant, Uriel Sebree was among the officers attached to Bache under Lieutenant Commander C. M. Chester, USN

August 1878 saw the steamer engaged in surveying the Merrimack River entrance, with operations shifting to surveys in the vicinity of Block Island during September. Shifting south to the Gulf of Mexico, the ship was to have surveyed near Charlotte Harbor and Tampa Bay; however, two weeks after arrival at Charlotte Harbor in early January 1879 an "emergency arose" requiring the Bache to shift to New Orleans for surveys in and around the mouths of the Mississippi, Atchafalaya and Red rivers. Of particular note was the survey of several crevasses (levee failures); specifically the Morganza, Diamond Island, Bonnet Carré, that is now the Bonnet Carré Spillway, and Glascock crevasses. Sounding sections were run across the Mississippi at "Cowpen Bend, about four miles above Natchez." After completion of these surveys of the rivers Bache sailed north again and from May 28, 1879, into early July surveyed the eastern approach to Mount Desert Island in Maine through October.

After completion of surveys in the north during 1879 and a repair period, Bache returned to the work in Florida at Charlotte Harbor, anchoring there on January 30, 1880. Immediate work in the area was completed May 14, and then an investigation of the Gulf shore and erection of signals was interrupted by breakdown and then weather. The ship left for Baltimore on May 26, where she underwent a major overhaul that included "complete sheathing of wood three inches in thickness" with copper and a new steam capstan and donkey boiler for heating and producing pure drinking water.

The overhauled Bache, now under the command of Lieutenant Commander Eugene B. Thomas, USN, spent late summer of 1881 surveying in the vicinity of New York between Sandy Hook and Coney Island, including the ship channel into The Narrows. On completion the ship spent December 19, 1881, through April 14, 1882, resurveying Norfolk Harbor and then transited to the east coast of Florida. In May 1882 Bache arrived off the Indian River Inlet for surveys in which they charted the limits of a large, dangerous shoal, given the name "Saint Lucie", three and a half miles off shore, centered 27° 18′ 30″ N 80° 08′ 45″ W and extending about a mile north and south.

In early August 1882 Bache continued previous surveys in the approaches to New York until early November when weather and the season precluded operations there. Lieutenant Commander Thomas reported the weather "exceptionally unfavorable" during the survey. Command was transferred on November 25, 1882, to Lieutenant H. B. Mansfield, USN for southern operations. The ship arrived at Tampa Bay January 17, 1883 to continue surveys in that area, coaled at Key West, returned to the Charlotte Harbor area and surveyed between Bocilla Pass and New Pass March 2 through April 10, 1883, whereupon the ship transferred to the east coast of Florida to complete the survey between Jupiter Inlet and Key Biscayne May 1883, followed by return to New York for repair and refitting. Surveys in July 1883 of the entrance to New York revealed "holes" that turned out to be a "clearly defined gully" (Note: A likely early indication of the Hudson Canyon's upper reaches.) with unique "blue clay and fine sand" out to Sandy Hook. Winter work was again on the west coast of Florida with aging boilers, found to be weakening during the survey, being of considerable concern for her passage north at the season's end with the voyage in the best of June weather accomplished "much to the relief of all concerned" and the conclusion it was "a matter of absolute necessity to construct a new boiler before she again goes into active service."

Bache was awaiting boiler work the summer of 1884 with her party assisting in work in the vicinity of New York with a change of command from Lieutenant H. R. Mansfield, USN, to Lieutenant E. D. F. Heald, USN, Assistant Coast and Geodetic Survey and former commander of the schooner Eagre, who then took the ship to survey the coasts of Alabama, Louisiana and the west coast of Florida. The routine of surveys in the north during summer, a yard period and then a winter season in southern waters, ranging to Texas, continued until an accident with the Bache's boilers in the vicinity of Nantucket Shoals required she be towed by the Blake to New York for major repairs, taking her out of service for a month.

Boston approaches and entrance were subject of surveys in the summer of 1892, after which she began surveys in New York harbor. In December 1892 a party detached from Bache made a plane table survey of Ellis Island supporting land survey work to establish the positions of buildings and wharves of the immigration station. The commanding officers of both Bache and Blake were directed on March 30, 1893, to support the speed trials of the new cruiser, USS Detroit in Newport Harbor. The final trial was over a 40-mile (64 km) course laid out in 1890 by the Coast and Geodetic Survey. The vessels supported current measurements on the course using the Pillsbury current meter through April 17, 1893, when she returned to New York for extensive repairs. Those repairs included new engines and boilers.

Repairs, begun March 23, 1893, at Brown & Miller, Jersey City, New Jersey, had revealed upon removal of the old engine and boilers that the frames and decking beneath were in "very bad shape", with iron plating on the skin "entirely gone" in places. The major overhaul involved all components including rigging to possibly extend the ship's useful life ten years. This work was completed in December 1893. On completion of repairs Bache went to South Carolina by way of Baltimore for surveys of the Ashley, Cooper and Wando rivers. Ship's parties engaged in assisting the shoreline survey party due to the extensive marshes in the area with a note that until March 6 "the entire force of the vessel" was used erecting shore signals. Hydrographic surveys in the Ashley showed washings of crushed phosphate rock at riverside works had increased shoals and diminished navigation of the river. The conclusion was that "should these injurious operations continue, it would seem to be only a question of time when the Ashley will cease to be a navigable stream." On May 12, 1894, the ship returned to New York to refit for northeastern coast surveys.

Surveys in the vicinity of Boston and nearby waters continued through the fall of 1894 and, leaving New York January 9, 1895, resumed the winter in Florida with surveys in Pensacola and Charlotte Harbor, arriving back in New York May 25, 1895, to prepare for the next season in the northeast.

On July 13, 1896, the ship left New Bedford for surveys in Buzzards Bay that included establishing a new position for the Nantucket South Shoal lightship. Bache was undergoing repairs in New York when detailed to confirm improvement of the channel at the bar at Brunswick, Georgia, to a specified width and depth in a contract with a "Mr. Goodyear", with "the method of improvement being by the explosion of dynamite on the bottom." Under an amendment to the river and harbor act of June 3, 1896, the Secretary of War was to supervise resurvey confirming the work by a qualified C&GS officer. Repairs were rushed and Bache sailed December 19, 1876, for Brunswick, reaching St. Simons Sound on the 27th. Weather delayed the survey until January 4, 1897, which continued through an "exceptionally stormy and unfavorable season" until April 16 with measurement requirements of unusual detail down to tenths of feet with 39,000 soundings being made. The ship sailed for New York, arriving April 27, where office work on board until June 22 completed the special survey sheets.

Between January and June 1898, Bache, along with the steamer Blake, were assigned temporary duty with the U.S. Navy for special naval surveys at Key West and Dry Tortugas as well as transport and dispatch duties. The ships were returned during June with naval officers being detached and replaced by civilian assistants. She was used to transport divers and salvage workers to Havana in February 1898 after the battleship USS Maine was destroyed in an explosion. The A. D. Bache was also involved in evacuating the injured.

In June 1899, after condemnation as being unseaworthy and with temporary repairs in Mobile, Alabama, in April, Bache was used for extensive surveys in more sheltered locations in the northern Chesapeake Bay. June work was in Baltimore, Maryland, and by August the shipboard party, under Assistant Philip A. Welker, was combining topographic and hydrographic work in the vicinity of Kent Island, Maryland. By the end of the season triangulation, shoreline, topography and hydrography extended from Kent Island to the Miles River. Bache finished the season December 7, 1899, and went into winter quarters in Baltimore until May 14, 1900. Between May 26 and 29 the ship went to Norfolk to observe a total eclipse of the sun, returning to Baltimore to prepare for the same combined topographical and hydrographic work below the Potomac River. She finished her last survey and broke off on December 17, 1900, to arrive in New York on December 17, 1900.

== New crewing scheme ==
Bache finished her last surveys in the Chesapeake under a new crewing scheme, as Congress had instituted a radical change in the crewing of the vessels through appropriation law approved June 6, 1900, effective July 1, 1900. From that date "all necessary employees to man and equip the vessels" were funded as opposed to the previous scheme in which U.S. Navy officers had commanded and Navy enlisted personnel had crewed the Survey's vessels. By prearrangement all naval personnel would remain with the ships until the first call at the home port where the transfer would be made, with the Survey reimbursing Navy for pay after July 1 for those personnel.

== Fate ==
In April 1899 the steamer Bache of 1871 was condemned as unseaworthy and inspected in Mobile by Assistant H. G. Ogden, then supervising construction of Pathfinder, with temporary repairs making her safe for the voyage to New York authorized. Coast and Geodetic Survey appropriations for the fiscal year 1901 included $60,000 for rebuilding the A. D. Bache. On December 17, 1900, after work in Chesapeake Bay, Bache under command of Assistant W. I. Vinal departed Baltimore arriving at "Shooter's Bay", New York, on the 19th and placed in drydock at Towsend and Downey Shipbuilding and Repair Company, which had been awarded "a contract for building a new hull" even though "rebuild" is noted in other records.

The old hull was apparently "condemned to the shipbreakers" with that hull sold to the Navy for experimental purposes.

The new hull, boiler and transferred machinery and instruments became the USC&GS A. D. Bache (1901).
