= USC&GS A. D. Bache (1901) =

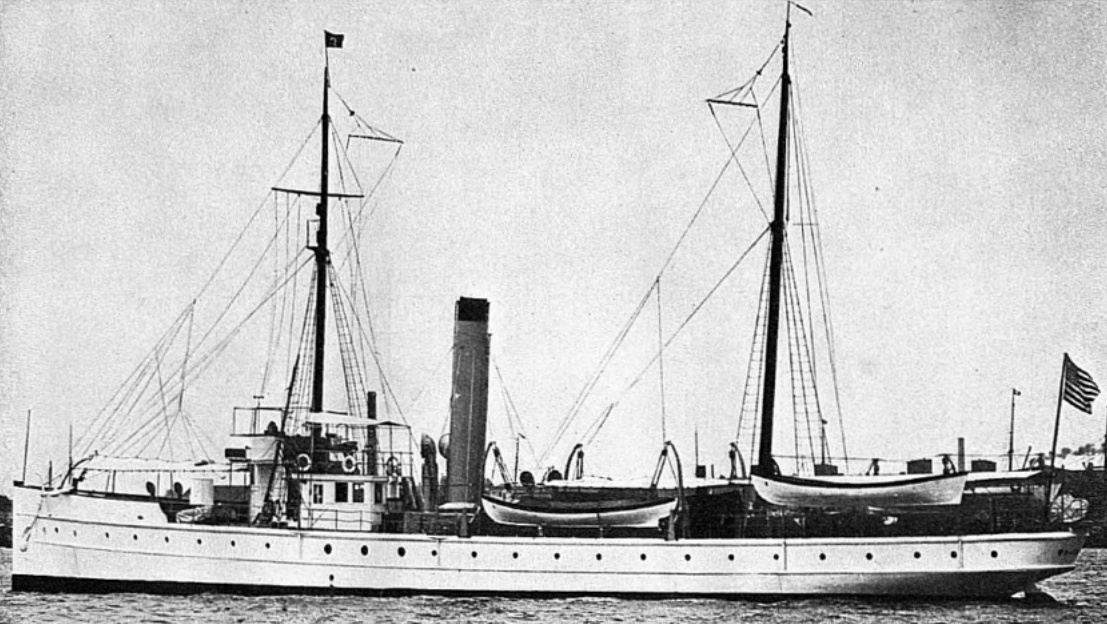
- C&GS Ship A.D. Bache of 1901 (c. 1916)

History

United States
- Name: USC&GS A. D. Bache
- Namesake: Alexander Dallas Bache, former Superintendent of the Coast Survey.
- Builder: Towsend and Downey Shipbuilding and Repair Company, Shooter's Island, New York
- Launched: 1901

General characteristics
- Tonnage: 370 grt
- Displacement: 472 tons
- Length: 153 ft 2 in (46.69 m)
- Beam: 26 ft 2 in (7.98 m)
- Draught: 10 ft 0 in (3.05 m)
- Propulsion: steam/sail
- Speed: 10.5
- Endurance: 96 ton coal capacity
- Complement: 9 officers, 42 men
- Notes: Modern sources, including DANFS and the NOAA ship page, perpetuate identical tonnage and dimensions for the 1871 and 1901 ships. An entirely new hull was built in 1901. Contemporary sources, the annual reports to Congress, clearly specific to the ships of 1871 and 1901 are different and are used.

USC&GS A. D. Bache (1901-1927), often referred to only as Bache, continued the name of the Bache of 1871 and has been confused, including in the Dictionary of American Naval Fighting Ships, with that ship even though an entirely new hull and boiler were built in 1901 and only the name and some machinery and instruments were transferred to the new hull. The Bache of 1901 was transferred to the U.S. Navy for World War I service between 24 September 1917 through 21 June 1919 when she was returned to the Coast and Geodetic Survey.

== A new ship built-1901 ==
In April 1899 the steamer Bache of 1871 was condemned as unseaworthy and inspected in Mobile by Assistant H. G. Ogden, then supervising construction of Pathfinder, with temporary repairs making her safe for the voyage to New York authorized. Coast and Geodetic Survey appropriations for the fiscal year 1901 included $60,000 for rebuilding the A. D. Bache. On December 17, 1900, after work in Chesapeake Bay, the Bache of 1871 under command of Assistant W. I. Vinal departed Baltimore arriving at "Shooter's Bay", New York on the 19th and placed in drydock at Towsend and Downey Shipbuilding and Repair Company which had been awarded "a contract for building a new hull" even though "rebuild" is noted in other records.

There a "new hull of composite construction" (Note: The old hull was apparently "condemned to the shipbreakers" with that hull then being sold to the Navy for experimental purposes as noted in the Dictionary of American Naval Fighting Ships entry for the ship.) was built to designs by Mr. L. B. Friendt of Baltimore and a new boiler was provided with machinery, instruments and the name from the old ship transferred to the new hull which was launched September 21, 1901. The vessel was 472 tons displacement/370 gross tons with a registered length of 153.2 feet, beam of 26.2 feet and 10 foot draft of 400 horsepower for a speed of 10.5 knots. She had a capacity for 96 tons of coal and 9 officers and 42 men.

Accepted January 18, 1902 the vessel completed outfitting, with personnel and a boat conducting a four-day hydrographic examination in the vicinity of Shooters Island before departure.

== New crewing scheme ==
On July 1, 1900, months before entering the yard for the complete rebuild, Congress had instituted a radical change in the crewing of USC&GS vessels. Appropriation law approved June 6, 1900, effective July 1, 1900, had funded "all necessary employees to man and equip the vessels" rather than the previous scheme in which U.S. Navy officers had commanded and Navy enlisted personnel had crewed the USC&GS vessels. Bache sailed for her new career under the command of USC&GS Assistant Philip A. Welker, (Note: Previously the Survey's officers and men were detached from the U.S. Navy to the Coast and Geodetic Survey under existing law that required hydrography of the Coast Survey be executed by officers and men of the Navy when they can be furnished (Ref: page 3, "Vessels," Report Of The Superintendent of the Coast And Geodetic Survey Showing The Progress Of The Survey During The Year 1874). Typical listing in these reports of commanding officers would be: "Lieut. Commander John A. Howell, U.S.N., Assistant in the Coast Survey" with "Assistant" being a title for both high office and topographic survey management positions and ship's commanding officers.) previously commanding the steamer Blake, with a civilian crew.

== USC&GS Service 1901-1917 ==
The ship sailed from Shooters Island, New York under command of Assistant P. A. Welker March 3, 1902 for Baltimore where minor alterations to machinery were made before her departure to the Gulf of Mexico on April 14, 1902 to survey Apalachicola Bay and entrance to St. Andrew Sound.

== U.S. Naval Service ==
Bache was transferred to the Navy on 24 September 1917, and served with the section patrol in the 5th Naval District, operating out of Norfolk, Virginia until the end of the First World War. She is not shown as being commissioned during that service.

Bache was returned to the Coast and Geodetic Survey under the Executive Order of February 26, 1919 that required the vessel's return no later than April 1, 1919. From that time until mid July 1920 the ship was being refitted for survey work. During August through November 21 she worked the entrances to the Chesapeake Bay, outfitted until December 23 when she departed for Pensacola Bay. Bache surveyed westward from Pensacola until return to Norfolk to undergo repairs May 14-June 16, 1920.

== USC&GS Service 1919-1927 ==
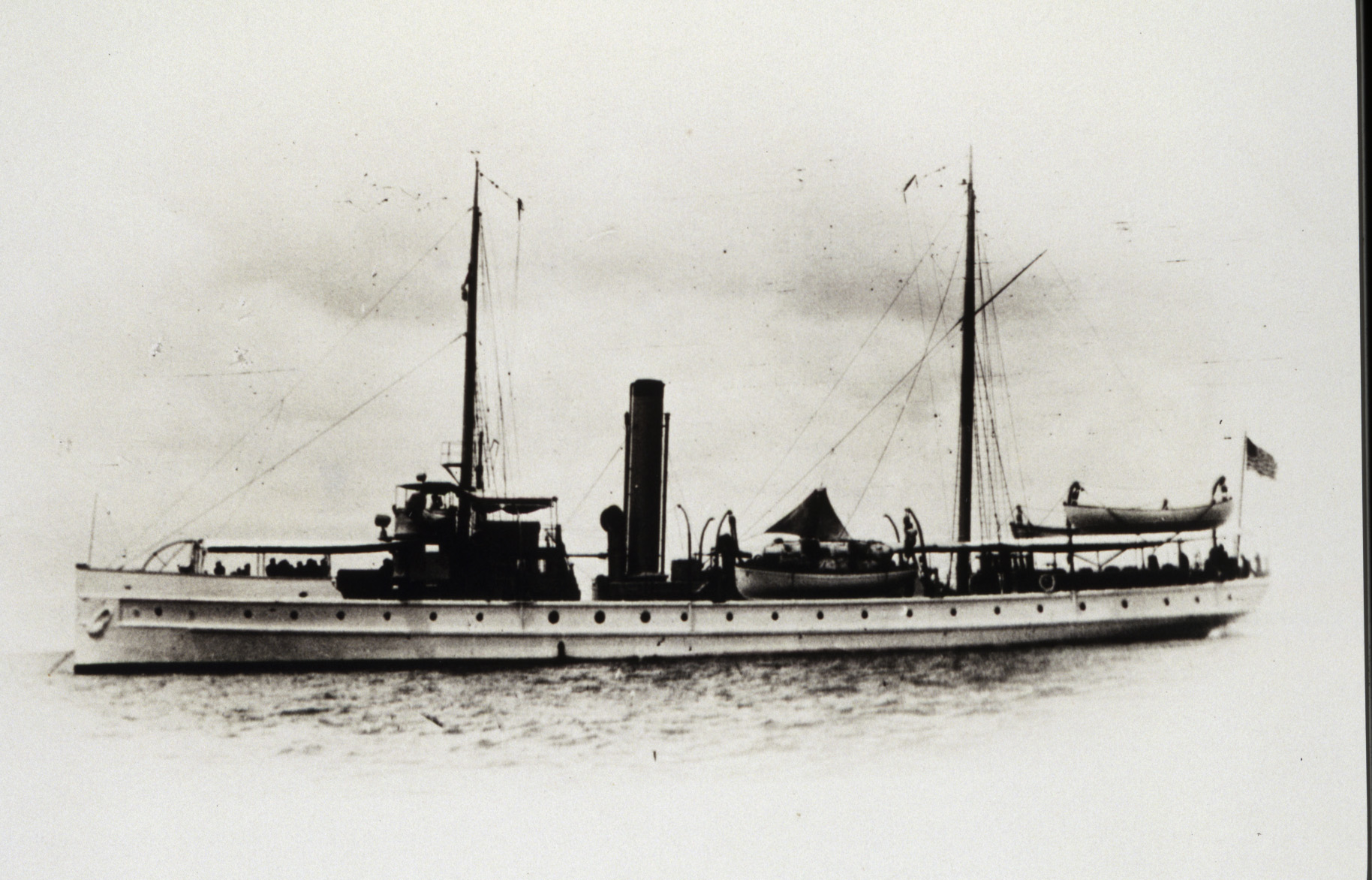
Coast and Geodetic Survey Ship Bache in 1922.

1920-21: surveys Chesapeake Bay entrance to Delaware Bay. including shoreline topography and current measurements. In October, 1920 the steamer began work in the vicinity of Savannah and Tybee Island, Georgia to Hilton Head, South Carolina until December when unfavorable weather closed the season and the ship was ordered to Baltimore for repairs. After experiencing "exceedingly disagreeable weather" on the voyage from Charleston to Cape Hatteras the ship was turned over to the Coast Guard depot in Baltimore for repairs on January 5, 1921. On February 8, 1921, the ship returned to surveys north of Chesapeake Bay.
