= Temporary buildings of the National Mall =

Series of buildings in Washington, D.C.

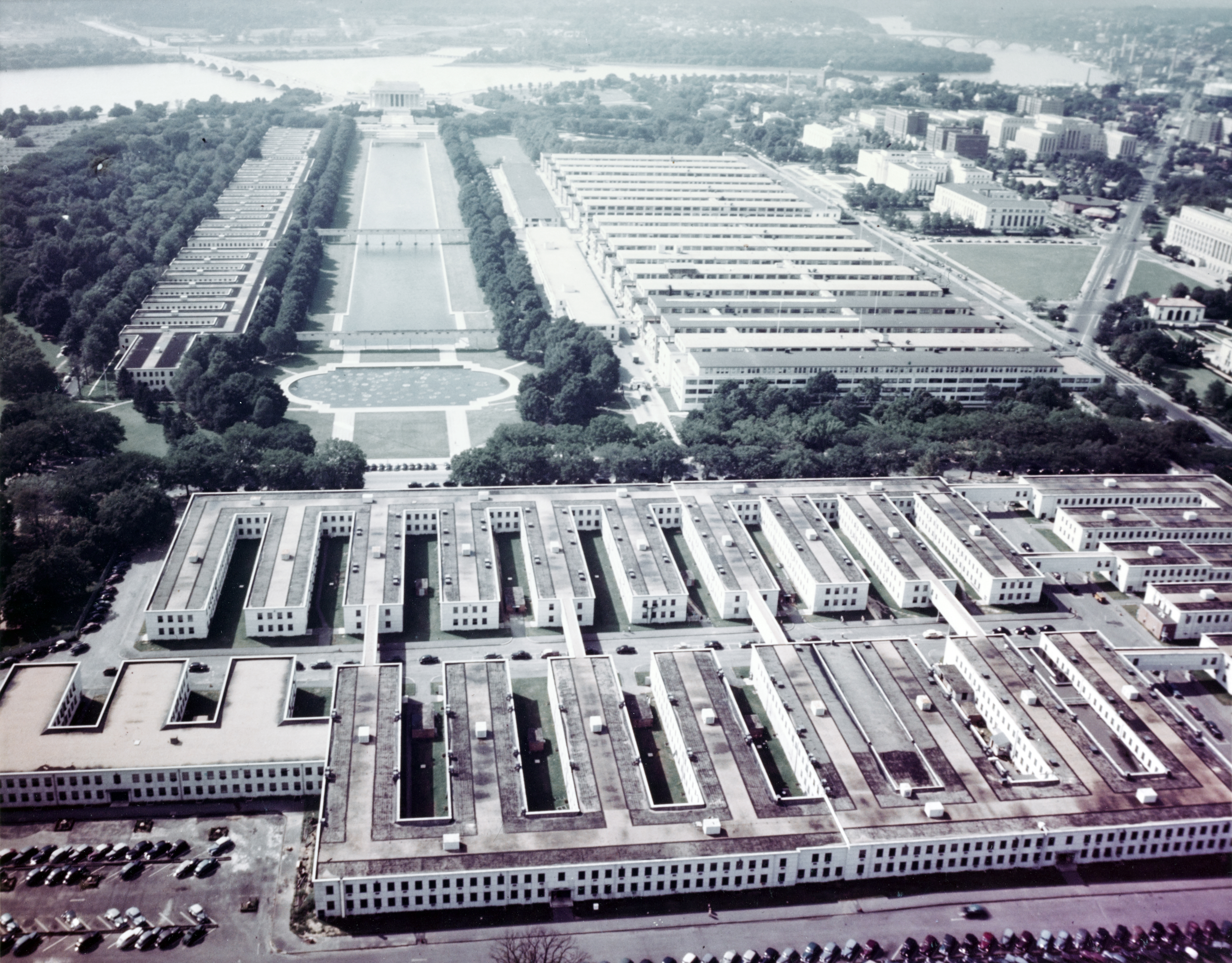
A Westward view from the top of the Washington Monument in 1943 or 1944. The Main Navy and Munitions Buildings, dating from World War I, stand to the right of the Lincoln Memorial Reflecting Pool. The other temporary buildings were constructed during World War II.

The U.S. government constructed a number of temporary buildings on the National Mall during World War I and II which stood from 1918 until 1971. They were built due to the urgent need for office space during wartime, but they remained in use during peacetime even though they disrupted the intended layout of the mall according to the McMillan Plan for over half a century.

In 1918, the Main Navy and Munitions Buildings were constructed alongside the Lincoln Memorial Reflecting Pool in West Potomac Park. A cluster of six buildings was built in the center of the Mall in the vicinity of 7th Street. All but one of the latter six buildings was demolished by 1937. Fourteen new temporary buildings were constructed throughout the Mall in 1942. Most of these stood until the mid-1960s, and the last one was demolished in 1971. Constitution Gardens, the National Museum of American History, the East Wing of the National Gallery of Art, and the National Air and Space Museum were all built at the locations of demolished temporary buildings.

== Background ==
The 1902 McMillan Plan proposed an overarching layout for the National Mall based on City Beautiful principles, replacing the Victorian layout that existed at that point. Its early implementation prior to World War I included initiating the replacement of the old Department of Agriculture Building with the current headquarters, removal of the Baltimore and Potomac Railroad Station, and construction of the National Museum of Natural History.

The entry of the United States into World War I in April 1917 led to an expansion of the federal government, causing urgent need for new office space to be constructed. Park space on the National Mall was appropriated for this purpose. Although the buildings were intended to be temporary, in 1918 the U.S. Commission of Fine Arts suggested that they would likely remain in use long past the end of the war.

== East of the Washington Monument ==
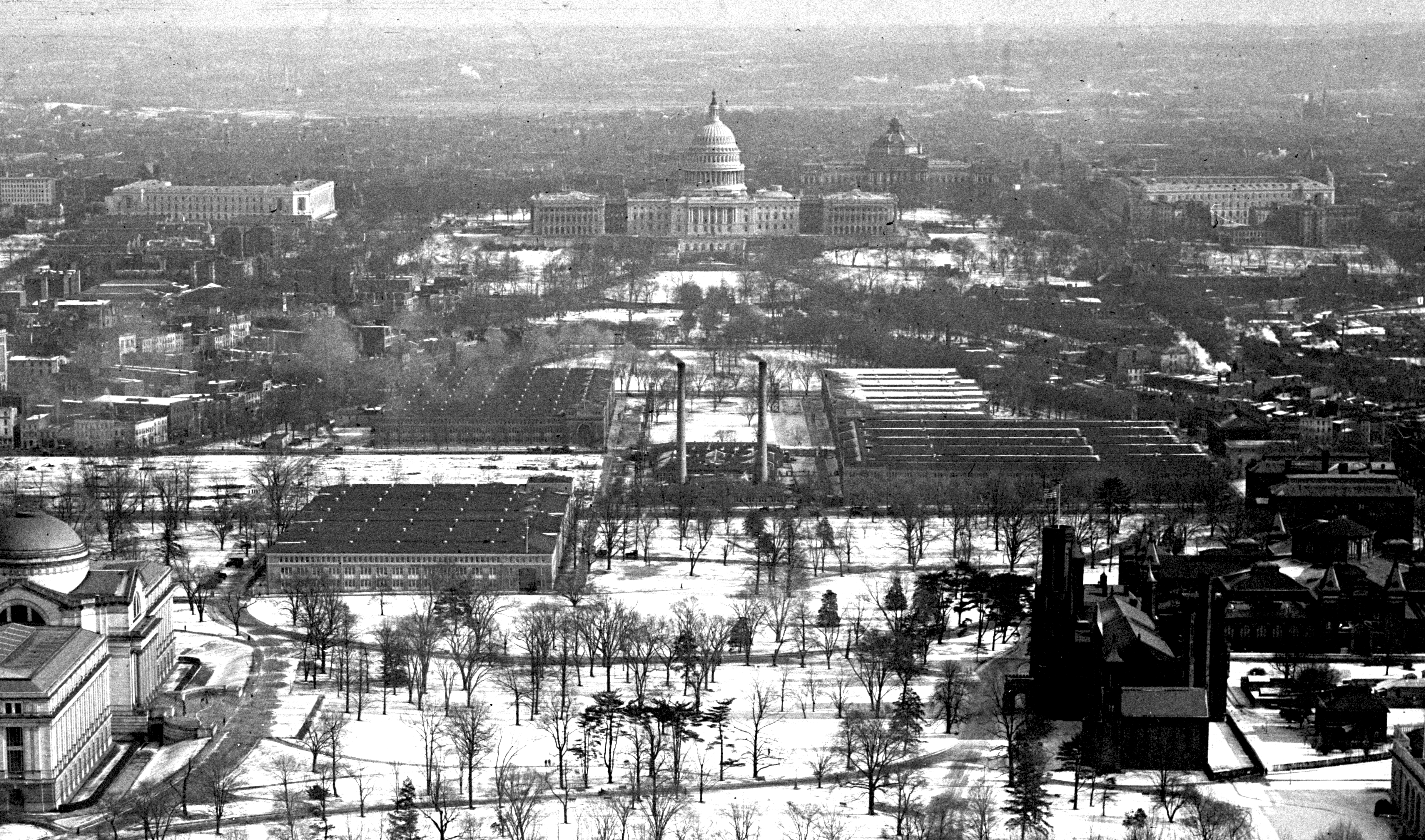
An eastward view of the National Mall from the top of the Washington Monument in 1922. The four structures and two smokestacks crossing the Mall are Temporary Buildings C–F and their associated heating plant. In the late 1930s, all but Building E were demolished.

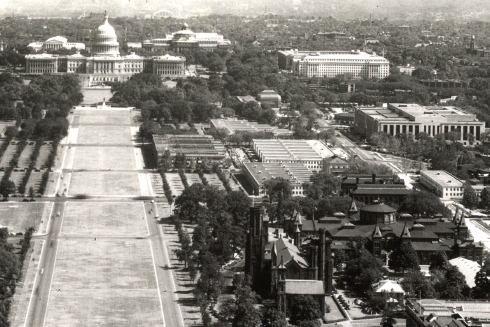
In 1942, Building E was joined by three new temporary buildings. They were demolished during 1966–1971. The National Air and Space Museum was constructed in their place.

=== World War I buildings ===
In 1918, the government built a complex of temporary buildings in the vicinity of 7th Street consisting of six lettered office buildings with an administration building, mechanical building, and restaurant at their center. They were designed by architect Horace Peaslee. The wards of the Armory Square Hospital had previously occupied the area during the Civil War. The Armory building remained in use to the immediate south of the temporary buildings. Although they did not conform to the McMillan Plan, their footprints left space for the streets planned to cross the Mall. Many of the buildings were of wood construction, although Building E was concrete. Unlike the other buildings, Building E was fireproof.

Buildings A and B were demolished in the early 1920s. Their site was assigned to the George Washington Memorial Building, whose foundation was constructed beginning in 1921, but the building was never completed. The site was later used for the National Gallery of Art.

After the war, the remaining buildings held offices for the Departments of Agriculture, Commerce, the Treasury, and War. In July 1920, Building C contained offices of the Public Health Service. In April 1929, it became its temporary headquarters when the Butler Building was closed for demolition, until May 1933, when the new Public Health Service Building opened.

Beginning in 1929, and accelerating with the inauguration of Franklin D. Roosevelt in 1933, impetus increased for further implementation of the McMillan Plan. In 1930, the Commission of Fine Arts blamed the temporary buildings for "producing a depressing air of slovenliness" on the Mall. The central heating plant was seen as a priority to be demolished, as it sat exactly on the Mall's central axis. Demolition contracts were issued in May 1935. In 1934, the D Building was demolished, and the C Building in 1935. The F Building was demolished by 1937, leaving only the E Building standing.

=== World War II buildings ===
A 1946 map of central Washington, D.C., including the names and locations of temporary buildings

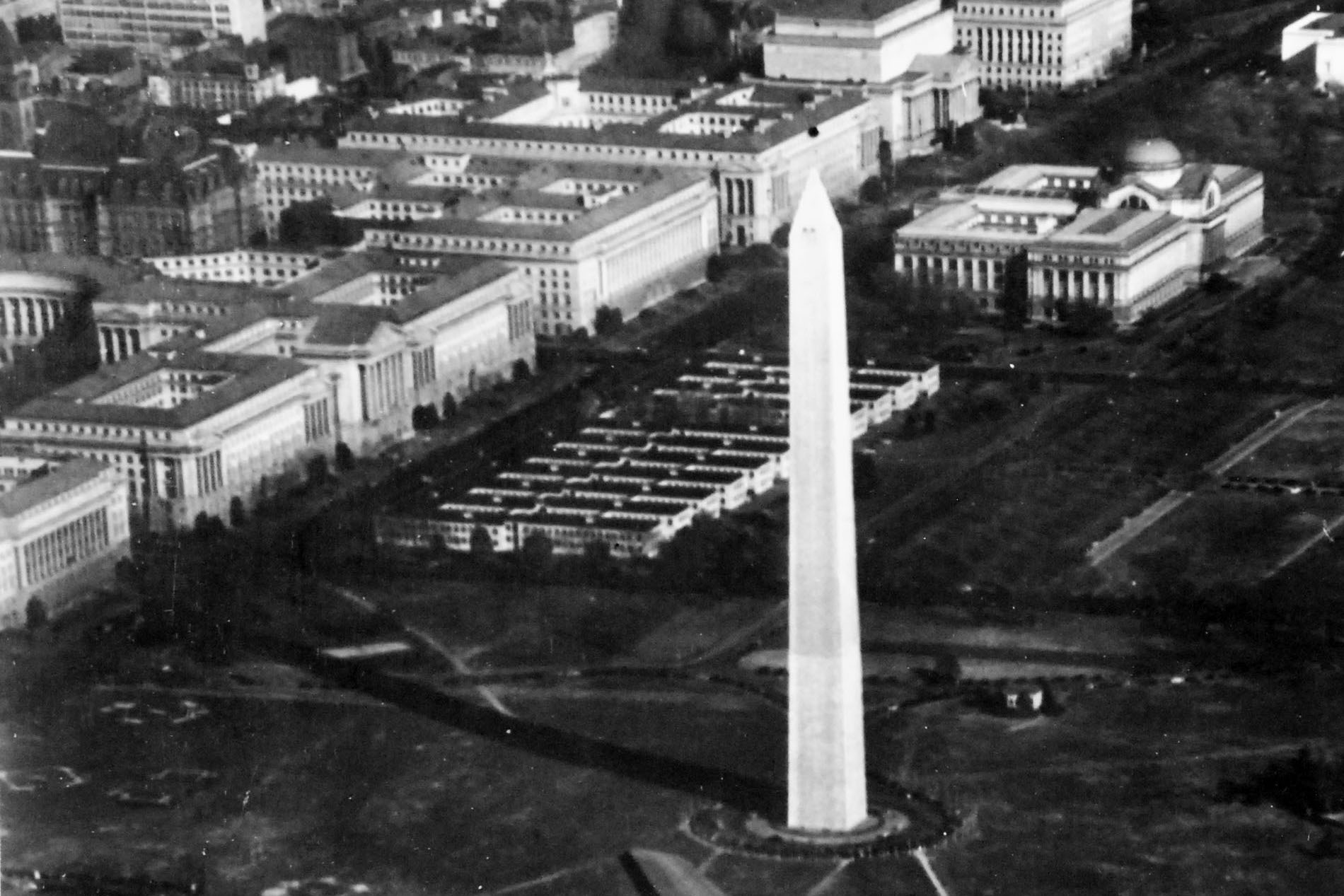
World War II Temporary Buildings T and U in 1950. These were demolished in 1958 for the construction of the National Museum of American History.

During World War II, the E Building remained from World War I. The other letters were reused for different buildings in different locations, some of which were not on the Mall. During World War II, the temporary buildings clustered near 7th Street on the south edge of the Mall were Buildings D, E, R, and S. Buildings T and U were built near 14th Street on the north side of the Mall.

After World War II, Buildings E and R were occupied by the Veterans Administration, and Building S by the Department of Health, Education and Welfare.

In 1958, Buildings T and U were demolished to make way for the construction of the National Museum of American History. In 1966, the buildings near 7th Street were demolished. In 1971, building E was the last temporary building on the Mall to be demolished. Part of the National Air and Space Museum occupied its spot.

== West of the Washington Monument ==
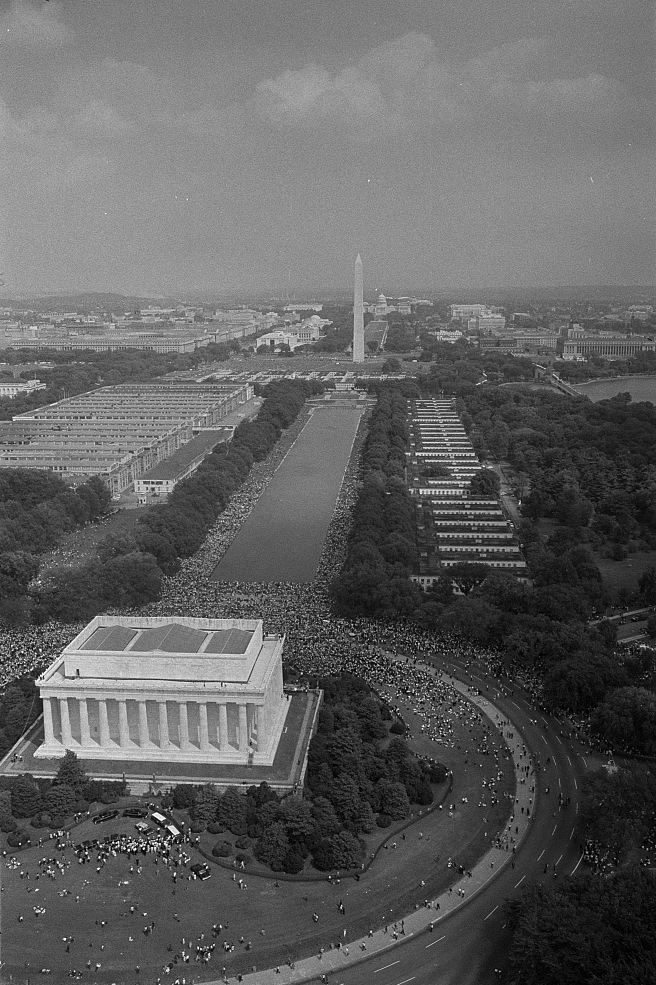
A view of the 1963 March on Washington for Jobs and Freedom, with the temporary buildings still in place. The Main Navy and Munitions Buildings are on the left. The Bureau of Supplies and Accounts buildings are to the right. The Bureau of Ships buildings are at the far end of the Reflecting Pool.

=== Main Navy and Munitions Buildings ===
In 1918, contractors for the United States Navy's Bureau of Yards and Docks constructed the Main Navy and Munitions Buildings along nearly a third of a mile of the south side of Constitution Avenue, then known as B Street, from 17th Street NW to 21st Street NW. Their construction was concurrent with that of the Lincoln Memorial and its Reflecting Pool during 1914–1922. Although the Navy intended the buildings to provide temporary quarters for the United States military during World War I, the reinforced concrete structures remained in place until 1970.

The Main Navy and Munitions Buildings were demolished in 1970. Much of their former site became Constitution Gardens, which was dedicated in 1976.

=== Later buildings ===
In 1942, the Main Navy and Munitions Buildings were joined by a larger set of temporary buildings. Temporary Buildings 3, 4, and 5 to the pool's east housed the Navy's Bureau of Ships. Buildings I, J, K, and L to its south housed the Bureau of Supplies and Accounts. Buildings N and W were constructed to its north, adjoining the Main Navy and Munitions Buildings. These buildings were all demolished in 1964.

ln 1972, Tempo A, B and C were located outside the walls of Ft. McNair. Tempo-A was mostly empty and used for furniture storage, with part of Nixon's reelection campaign occupying it for a short period of time. Tempo-B housed the just formed U.S. Army Criminal Investigation Command. Tempo-C housed the U.S. Park Police.
