= Richards Building =

Headquarters of the U.S. Coast and Geodetic Survey from 1871 to 1929

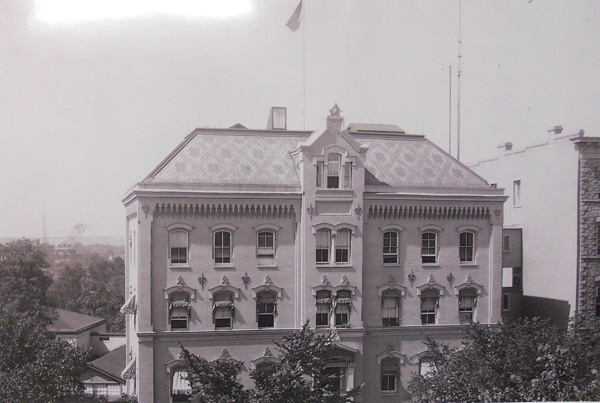
- The Richards Building in 1923

- Location within Central Washington, D.C.

General information
- Architectural style: Rundbogenstil
- Location: 205 New Jersey Avenue, SE, Washington, D.C., United States
- Coordinates: 38.8868°N 77.0082°W
- Completed: 1871
- Demolished: 1929

Design and construction
- Architect: Adolf Cluss

The Richards Building was the headquarters of the United States Coast and Geodetic Survey from 1871 to 1929. It was located in Washington, D.C., on a block immediately south of the United States Capitol. It was demolished in 1929 to construct the Longworth House Office Building.

== Architecture ==
The building was designed by Adolf Cluss. It consisted of two connected units, a Main Building to the east facing New Jersey Avenue, and a Back Building facing South Capitol Street. The exterior of the Main Building was in the Rundbogenstil style, with red brick walls, brown stone trim, and a red, blue, and green patterned slate roof. It was designed with abundant windows and an innovative ventilation system.

== History ==
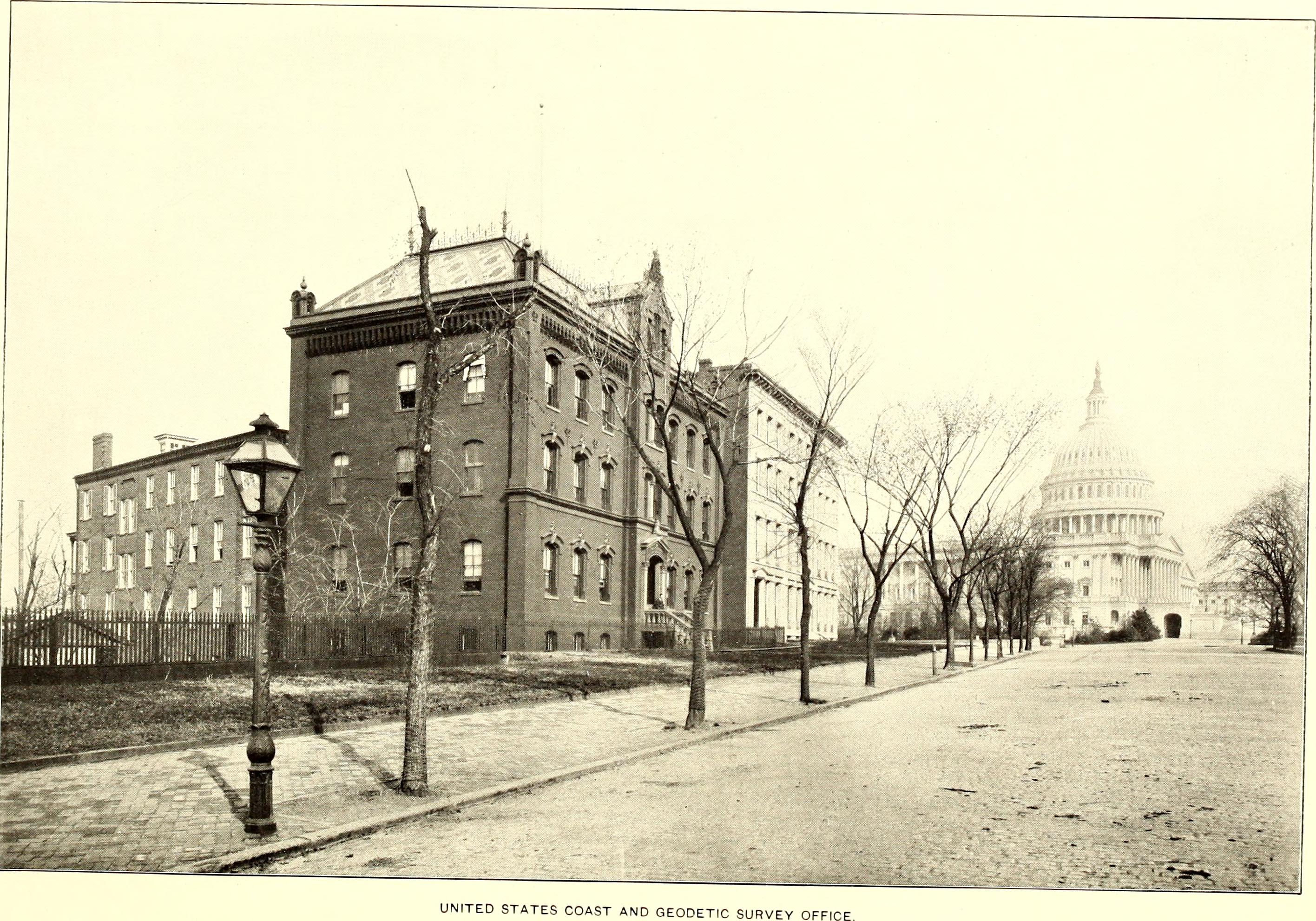
The Richards Building around 1902. The Back Building is visible to the left of the Main Building, and the Butler Building and United States Capitol are to the right and behind it.

The building was constructed by A. and T. A. Richards in 1871 and rented to the United States Coast Survey, which was renamed the United States Coast and Geodetic Survey in 1878. The builders structured the building in the form of a hotel with many small rooms, so it could be used as such if the government did not renew its initial 10-year lease. This caused difficulties, as the layout was not well suited to functions such as use as a printing and lithographic plant and machine and carpenter shop.

The building was not considered to be sufficiently fire-proof, so when the neighboring Butler Building was constructed as a residence in 1873, the superintendent of the U.S. Coast Survey requested that a portion of that building be constructed to be fire-proof so that it could be rented as storage for valuable and irreplaceable survey records, maps, and engraving plates.

The United States Government purchased the Richards Building outright in 1891. By 1916, the building was considered so inadequate that United States Secretary of Commerce William C. Redfield reported to the United States Congress that, "were there such a function as a public incendiary, these buildings are among the first that should receive his official attention." In 1929, the Coast and Geodetic Survey moved to the Department of Commerce Building, and the Richards Building was demolished to construct the Longworth House Office Building.
