= Eccles Building =

Federal Reserve building in Washington

Marriner S. Eccles Federal Reserve Board Building
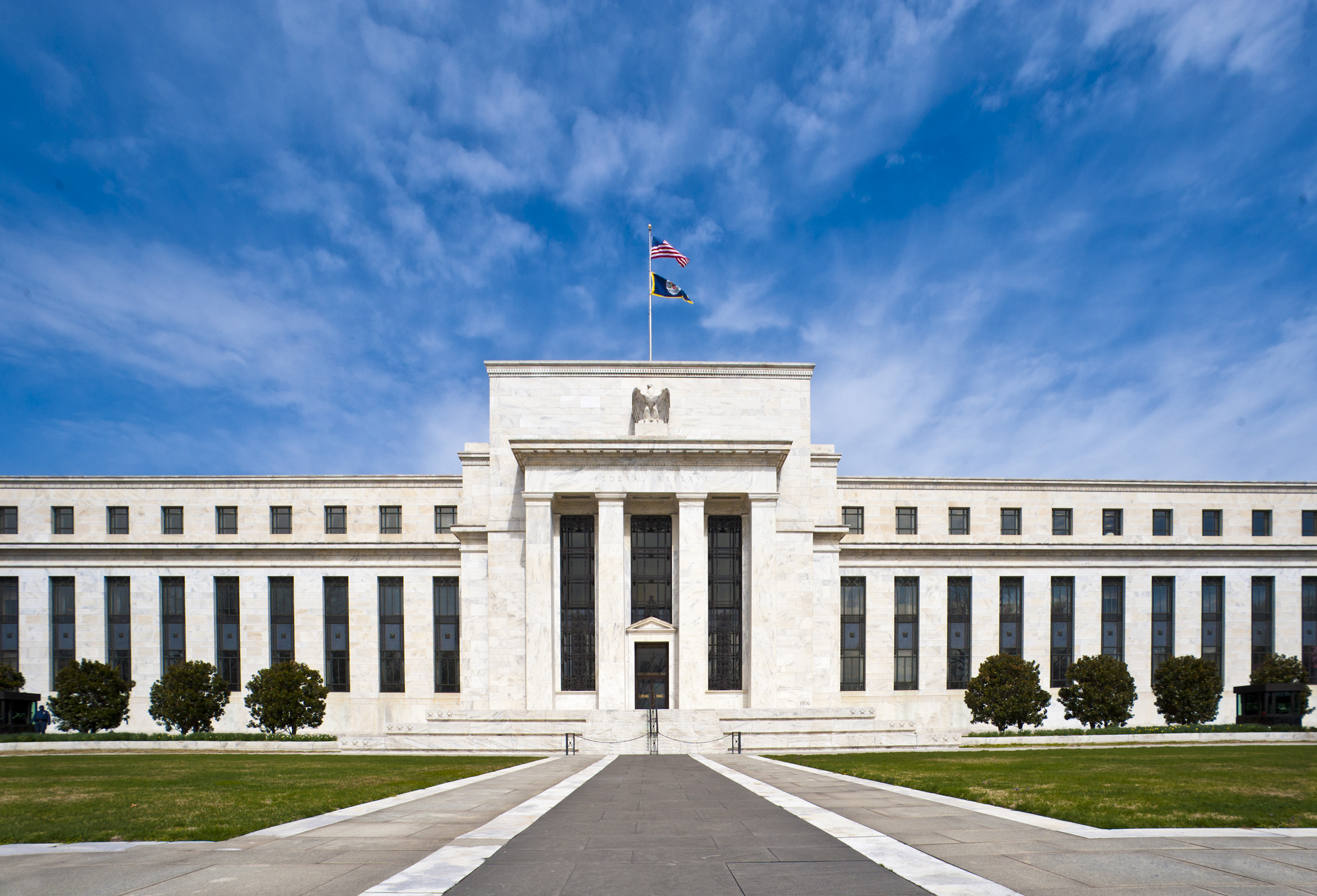
- Front entrance of the Eccles building
- Former names: Federal Reserve Building (1937–1982)

General information
- Architectural style: Stripped Classicism
- Location: Constitution Avenue, Washington, D.C., United States
- Coordinates: 38°53′34″N 77°2′45″W
- Completed: 1937; 89 years ago

Height
- Height: 85 feet (26 m)

Technical details
- Structural system: steel beam
- Floor count: 6

Design and construction
- Architect: Paul Philippe Cret

The Marriner S. Eccles Federal Reserve Board Building houses the main offices of the Board of Governors of the United States' Federal Reserve System. It is located at the intersection of 20th Street and Constitution Avenue in Washington, D.C. The building, designed in the Stripped Classicism style, was designed by Paul Philippe Cret and completed in 1937. President Franklin D. Roosevelt dedicated the building on October 20, 1937.

The building was named after Marriner S. Eccles (1890–1977), chairman of the Federal Reserve under President Roosevelt, by the Garn–St. Germain Depository Institutions Act on October 15, 1982. Previously it had been known as the Federal Reserve Building.

== Architectural competition ==
From 1913 to 1937, the Federal Reserve Board met in the United States Treasury building on Pennsylvania Avenue in Washington, D.C., while employees were scattered across three locations throughout the city. In response to the Banking Act of 1935, which centralized control of the Federal Reserve System and placed it in the hands of the Board, the Board decided to consolidate its growing staff in a new building, to be sited on Constitution Avenue and designed by an architect selected through an invited competition.

The principal officials overseeing the competition were Charles Moore, chairman of the United States Commission of Fine Arts, and Adolph C. Miller, a member of the Board since 1914. Miller drafted a statement to help the competing architects understand the concerns of Board, explaining that the traditional style of public architecture – with columns, pediments, and generous use of symbolic ornamentation – would not be of the utmost concern.

In describing the character of the building as governmental, it is not, however, intended to suggest that its monumental character should be emphasized. It is thought desirable that its aesthetic appeal should be through dignity of conception, proportion, scale and purity of line rather than through stressing of purely decorative or monumental features. For this reason it is suggested that the use of columns, pediments and other such forms may be altogether omitted and should be restricted to the character of the building as above described.

Proposals were received from architects such as John Russell Pope and James Gamble Rogers. Ultimately, the winner of the competition was the simplified classical design by Paul Philippe Cret.

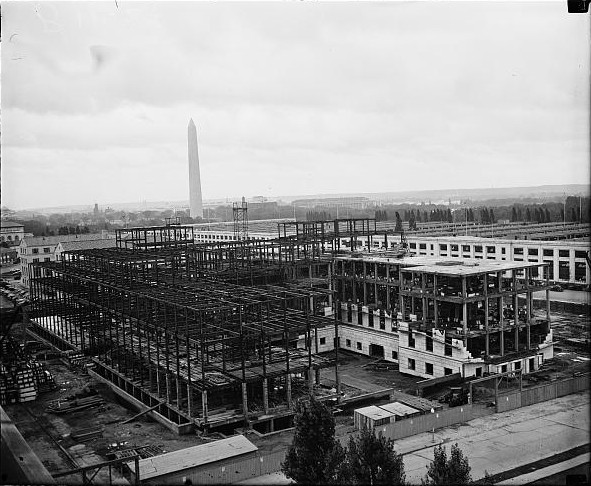
The Eccles Building under construction in 1936

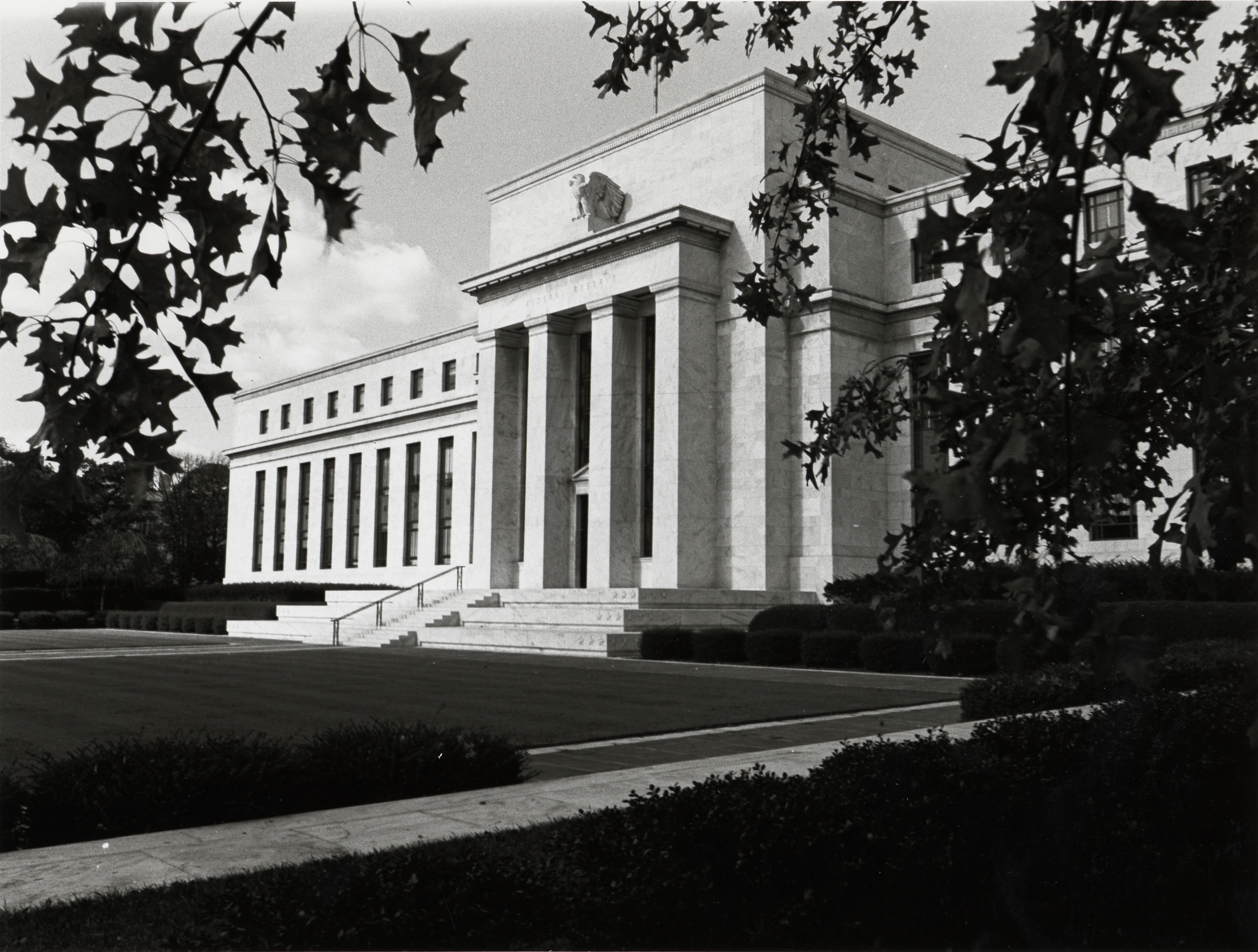
The Eccles Building in 1937

== The architect and the design ==
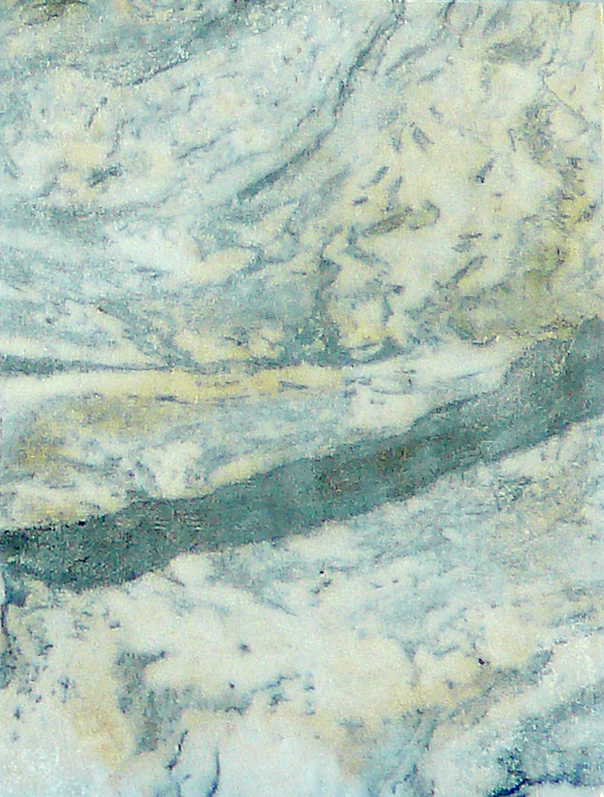
Creole marble sample

Cret was a naturalized U.S. citizen who had trained at the École des Beaux-Arts in Lyon and Paris. He was invited to the United States in 1903 to establish the department of architecture at the University of Pennsylvania, and established his own practice in 1907.

His first major commission was the Pan American Union Building, in Washington, D.C. (1908). Designed with Albert Kelsey, it was a building in quintessential Beaux-Arts style, with a classical façade, rich ornamentation, and allegorical references to the goals of the organization. This led to many other commissions for war memorials, civic buildings, court houses, and museums in cities such as Detroit, Hartford, Philadelphia, Indianapolis, and Washington, D.C.

By 1935, under the influence of Modernism, Cret's style had evolved toward the Stripped Classicism of buildings such as the Folger Shakespeare Library (1929–32). But true to the Beaux-Arts tradition, he oversaw every aspect of the building project, including technical and aesthetic details. His firm made more than 300 freehand sketches, measured plans, site plans, elevational studies, and perspective drawings, each of which could contain front, side, and top views, and sectional details when necessary.

The four-story building, with an exterior of Milford pink granite, is in the shape of the letter H, with the space on either side of the building's center forming east and west courtyards. The interior has a two-story atrium with dual staircases and a skylight etched with the outline of an eagle. The atrium floor is of marble and its walls are of travertine marble. The largest meeting space is the two-story Board Room.

Construction of the building began in 1935 and was completed in 1937. Its pragmatic classicism captured the spirit of Depression-era and wartime Washington, a city determined to remain grand but with nothing to spare on the non-essential.

== Ornamentation and furnishings ==
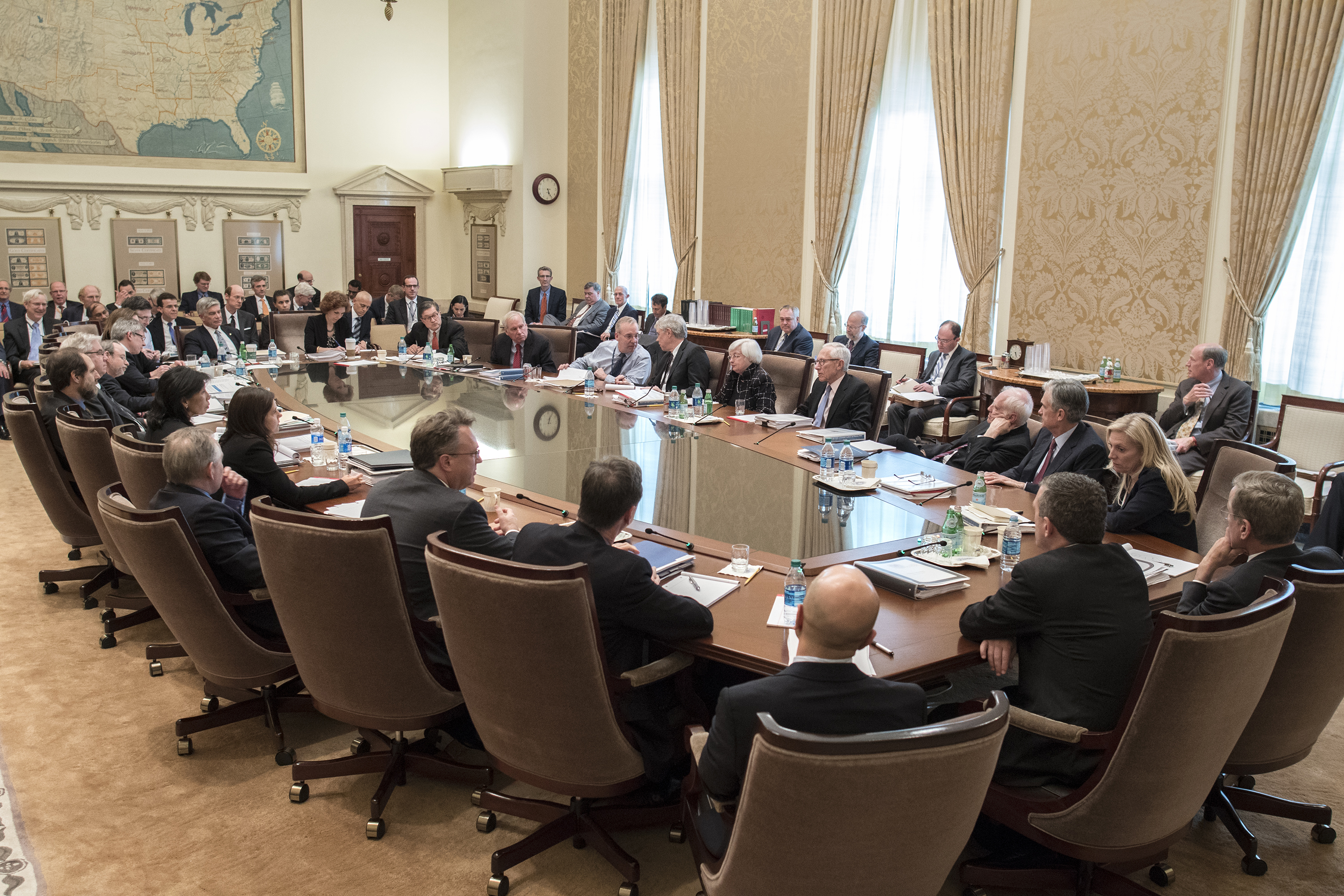
Meeting of the Federal Open Market Committee in the Board Room of the Eccles Building

Cret employed nationally recognized artists to complete the ornamentation and furnishing of the building. Sidney Waugh designed the eagle on the front facade, the building's only three-dimensional sculpture which was carved by the Piccirilli Brothers, while John Gregory carved bas-reliefs for the exterior of the C Street entrance. Samuel Yellin, a noted wrought-iron craftsman from Philadelphia, designed and executed numerous railings, gates, and fixtures throughout the building. Milford pink granite was used as a building material.

Mural artist Ezra Winter painted a large map of the United States for the Board Room, and sculptor Herbert Adams created memorials to President Woodrow Wilson and Senator Carter Glass to occupy niches in the main lobby. The furniture was produced by W. & J. Sloane, New York, with the architects having the final responsibility.

The building is undergoing both interior and exterior renovations as of September 2022, with plans approved by the National Capital Planning Commission in September 2021.

== Annex buildings ==
In 2018, FRB acquired the former United States Public Health Service Building (USPHS is now headquartered at the Hubert H. Humphrey Building), which is now undergoing renovations and will be referred to as the Federal Reserve Board East Building.

To the north side of C Street is the William McChesney Martin Jr. Building, which was built from 1971 to 1974 but was planned when the Eccles Building was completed and land acquired to facilitate future needs. The building was named for William McChesney Martin, who was Fed Chair from 1951 to 1970.
