= Main Navy and Munitions Buildings =

20th-century temporary war buildings on the National Mall

- United States
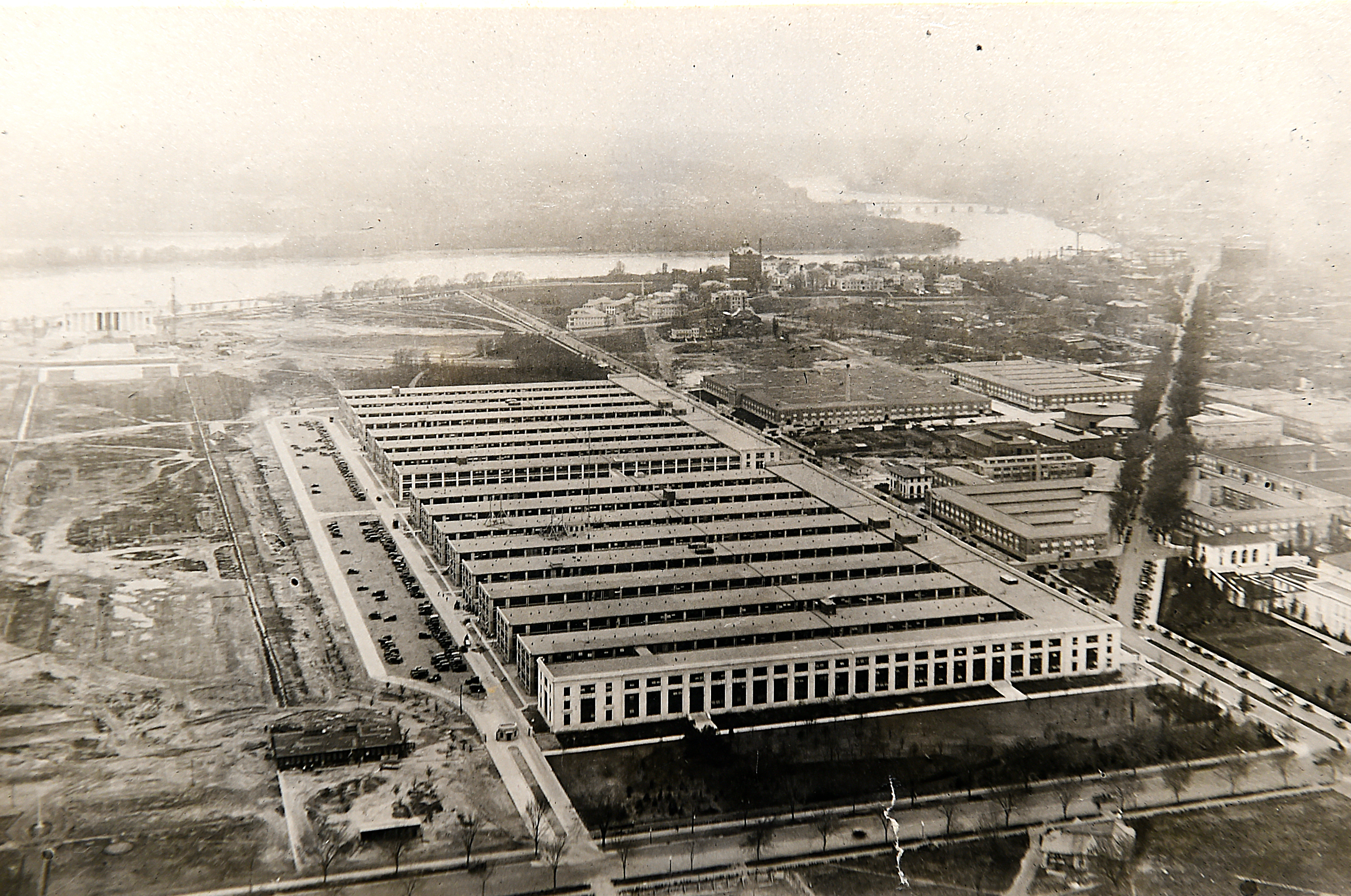
- The Main Navy Building (foreground) and the Munitions Building were temporary structures built during World War I on the National Mall

Site information
- Owner: United States Navy
- Condition: Demolished and became Constitution Gardens

Location
- Coordinates: 38°53′28.8″N 77°2′36.5″W

Site history
- Built: 1918
- Demolished: 1970

The Main Navy and Munitions Buildings were constructed in 1918 along Constitution Avenue, then known as B Street, on Washington, D.C.'s National Mall (Potomac Park) as the largest of a set of temporary war buildings on the National Mall. Both buildings were constructed by the Navy's Bureau of Yards and Docks, with the United States Department of War occupying the Munitions Building. To make the buildings more resistant to fire, the buildings were built using concrete. With solid construction, the temporary buildings remained used long after the end of World War I.

In August 1939, the Secretary of War relocated his offices from the overcrowded State-War-Navy Building, the Old Executive Office Building, to the Munitions Building. The Department of War headquarters remained in the Munitions Building in the early years of World War II until 1942, when some space became available in the Pentagon, which was then under construction. The Munitions Building was turned over to the Navy in 1943, when the Department of War vacated the Munitions Building once construction of the Pentagon was completed.

Both buildings suffered severe structural problems in the 1960s. In December 1969, President Richard Nixon announced that both buildings would be demolished, a plan carried out in 1970. The land was then reclaimed and turned into Constitution Gardens, with the Vietnam Veterans Memorial built near the former Munitions Building site in the early 1980s.

== Construction ==
Constructing the Munitions and Main Navy Buildings was an idea conceived by Franklin D. Roosevelt, then the Assistant Secretary of the Navy, who put forth the idea to President Woodrow Wilson. Roosevelt originally suggested a temporary building be placed on the Ellipse, but President Wilson disliked the idea of a building on the White House's front lawn. Thus, Roosevelt suggested placing the buildings on the National Mall (Potomac Park) along B Street, renamed Constitution Avenue in 1931, near the Lincoln Memorial.

Roosevelt wanted them to be ugly wooden buildings, so people would want to tear them down immediately after World War I. However, concrete and steel materials were recommended to make the buildings more fire resistant. Roosevelt later expressed regret for allowing these building to be constructed, saying in 1941, "I didn't think I would ever be let into the Gates of Heaven, because I had been responsible for desecrating the parks of Washington."

The project was originally intended for just the Navy, but the Department of War also wanted in on the project, so two buildings were proposed. With concrete construction not unreasonably more expensive than a wood frame building, Congress accepted the proposal for concrete buildings and approved the funds for the project in March 1918. The task of design and construction of the buildings was given to the Navy's Bureau of Yards and Docks, and the buildings were completed in 5 1/2 months. The primary designer of the buildings was Lieutenant Commander Frederic W. Southworth, chief architect of the Bureau, under the supervision of Commander Archibald L. Parsons.

== Munitions Building ==
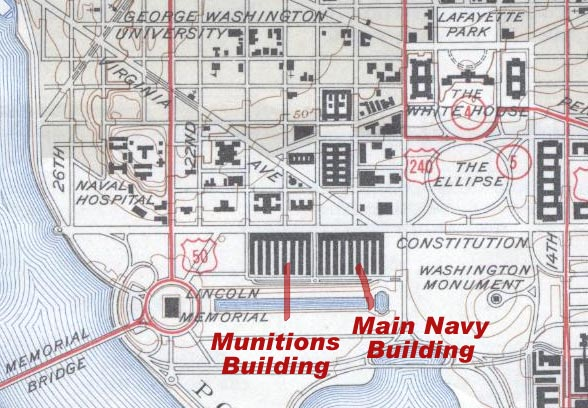
The location of the Munitions and Main Navy Buildings on a 1945 USGS map

The Munitions Building, constructed in 1918, contained 841,000 square feet (78,100 m^{2}) of space across three stories and was designed to provide temporary accommodations for 9,000 Department of War employees. During World War I, the War Department had greatly expanded. By the end of the war, the Main Navy and Munitions Building together housed 14,000 military personnel, including the Secretary of the Navy.

A large parking lot 100 feet (30 m) wide and 1/2 mile (800 m) long, was located at the rear of the Munitions Building, with space to accommodate approximately 1,000 cars. Small exhibits were on display in the corridors of the Munitions Buildings, showing military uniforms, types of gas masks, military daily rations, and Army photographs. The Munitions Building was separated from the Main Navy Building by a vehicle entryway at 19th Street. The main entrance of the Munitions Building was located at 20th Street. The Munitions Building had eight wings.

At the end of World War I, the Munitions Building housed technical branches, including the Quartermaster General, United States Army Corps of Engineers, Ordnance Corps, Chemical Warfare Service, Signal Corps, and Army Air Service. In March 1923, the Army's Finance Office also moved into the Munitions Building. In February 1924, plans were put forth to build an oil steam plant for the Main Navy and Munitions Building. In November 1933, the Army Inspector General's office, along with the Organized Reserves, the welfare section of the Secretary's office, and the Office of Chief of Chaplains moved into the Munitions Building. The National Guard Bureau also was housed in the Munitions Building, as was the Army Industrial College.

=== Headquarters ===
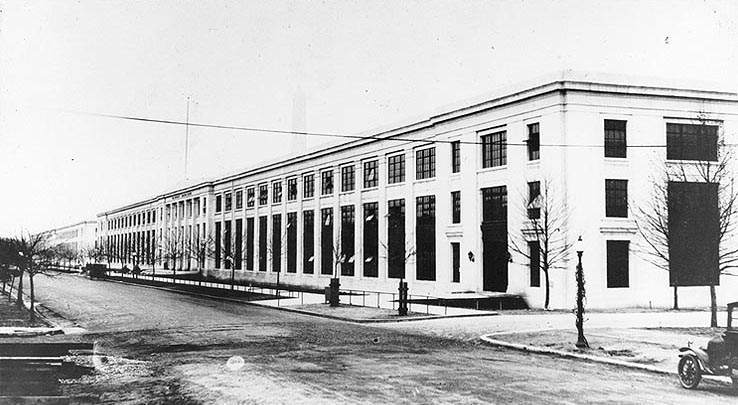
Munitions Building, located on Constitution Avenue, in 1919

At the time when the Munitions Building was constructed, the War Department was headquartered in the State-War-Navy Building, which was completed in 1888 and located on 17th Street NW, next to the White House. By the 1930s, the War Department was being squeezed out by the Department of State, and the White House also needed additional office space. In August 1939, Secretary of War Harry H. Woodring, along with Acting Chief of Staff of the Army George C. Marshall, moved his office into the Munitions Building.

In the late 1930s, a new War Department Building was constructed at 21st and C Streets in Foggy Bottom. Still, upon completion, the new building did not solve the department's space problem and ended up being used by the Department of State. To help deal with the space shortage, a fourth story was added to the Main Navy and Munitions Buildings during World War II.

Coming into office, with World War II breaking out in Europe, Secretary of War Henry L. Stimson was faced with the situation of the War Department spread out in numerous buildings across Washington, D.C., Maryland and Virginia, and the Munitions Building was overcrowded. On 28 July 1941, Congress authorized funding for a new Department of War building in Arlington, Virginia, which would house the entire department under one roof.

When office space became available in 1942 at the Pentagon, in the first completed wing, the Secretary of War vacated the Munitions Building and moved to the Pentagon. The Department of War vacated the Munitions Building in 1943 once the Pentagon was constructed. The Department of Navy took over the Munitions Building once the Department of War relocated out of the building and placed the Navy's Material Systems Command offices in the Munitions Building.

=== World War II ===
The Signal Intelligence Service was located in the Munitions Building during the early years of World War II. In September 1939, the Signal Intelligence Service was able to break Japan's cipher, Purple. The Department of War continued to receive intercepted messages, codenamed Magic, including final messages to the Japanese Embassy in Washington before the Attack on Pearl Harbor.

== Main Navy ==
The Navy used the Main Navy building from when it was built until it was demolished in 1970. The building contained 940,000 square feet (87,000 m^{2}) of space, nine wings, and was connected to the Munitions Building by an elevated covered walkway.

Navy offices housed in the Main Navy building soon after it opened included the Bureau of Ships, Bureau of Navigation, Bureau of Supplies and Accounts, Bureau of Steam Engineering, Bureau of Construction and Repair, the Bureau of Yards and Docks, Bureau of Ordnance, Bureau of Medicine and Surgery, the Secretary of Navy's offices, along with Naval Operations, and the Compensation Board. Later, other Navy Offices moved into Main Navy, including the Dispensary, the Navy Red Cross, Examining Board, and Retiring Board, previously housed in Corcoran Courts, an apartment building converted into offices.

The Hydrographic Office and United States Marine Corps moved to Main Navy from a Navy Annex building located at New York Avenue and 18th Street. The United States Coast Guard relocated from the Munsey Building. In 1923, the Navy Department Library was relocated to the Main Navy building. From 1926 to 1941, a small reinforced concrete roof penthouse on the Main Navy building was used for radio and communication intercepts training.

== Criticism ==
The Main Navy and Munitions Buildings were disliked by many, as going against the intentions of Pierre Charles L'Enfant of making the National Mall into an open space surrounded by aesthetically pleasing government buildings. The Munitions and Navy buildings were described as "unsightly shacks, of which many scores sprung up like mushrooms during the war". Due to their solid construction, some were concerned that the buildings would remain for an extended period.

== Demolition ==
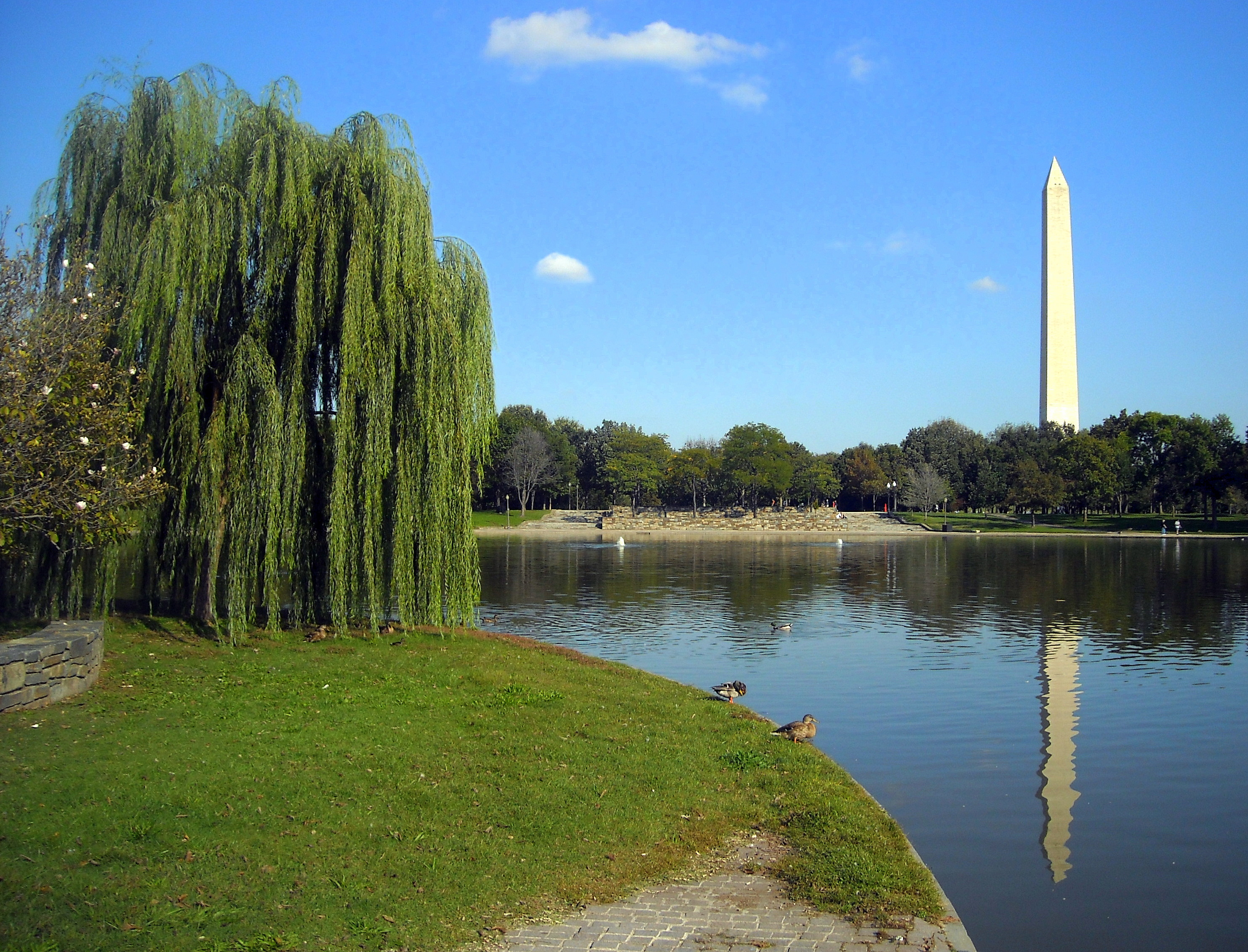
Constitution Gardens now occupies the former Munitions and Main Navy Buildings site.

By 1960, the Munitions Building housed approximately 7,000 employees of the Navy and Army, Air Force, Veterans Administration, and the Department of State. After decades of use, the building experienced structural problems in the late 1950s and 1960s, including cracked concrete piers, numerous interior cracked and bent walls, and settling floors. The buildings, constructed on marshy parkland, were damp, and the foundations settling.

In 1969, portions of the buildings were declared unsafe, resulting in approximately 3,000 employees relocating to other facilities. In December 1969, President Richard Nixon announced a plan for demolishing the Main Navy and Munitions Buildings. The plan involved moving Navy employees to new buildings in the Crystal City and Ballston areas in Arlington County, Virginia. The Main Navy and Munitions Buildings remained on the Mall until 1970, when they were demolished.

In the 1970s, Constitution Gardens was built on the former site of the Main Navy and Munitions Buildings, and the Vietnam Veterans Memorial was built nearby in the early 1980s.

== In popular culture ==
The buildings are briefly featured in the 1970 film Tora! Tora! Tora! and are used as a backdrop setting in the matters of the War Department leading up to the attack on Pearl Harbor. Shortly after the film was made, the buildings were demolished.
