= Butler Building =

Former US government building

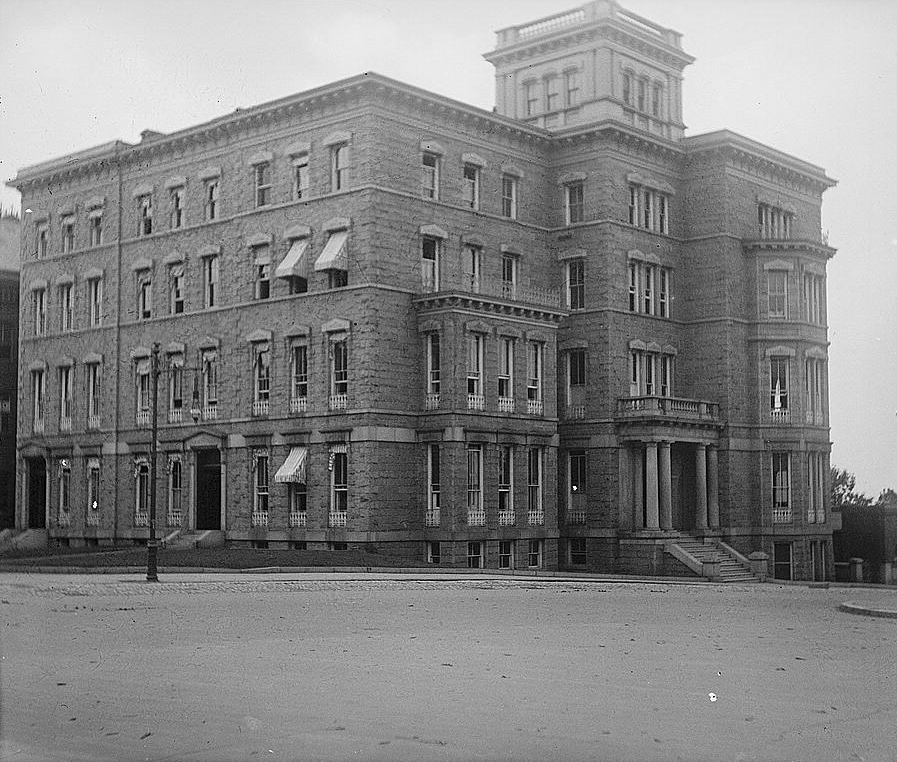
- The Butler Building around 1919, with New Jersey Avenue to the left and B Street to the right. The fireproof archival unit is the leftmost unit.
- Interactive map of the Butler Building area

General information
- Location: 3 B Street, SE, Washington, D.C.
- Coordinates: 38.8873°N 77.0085°W
- Named for: Benjamin Franklin Butler
- Completed: 1874
- Demolished: 1929

Technical details
- Material: Cape Ann granite, brick

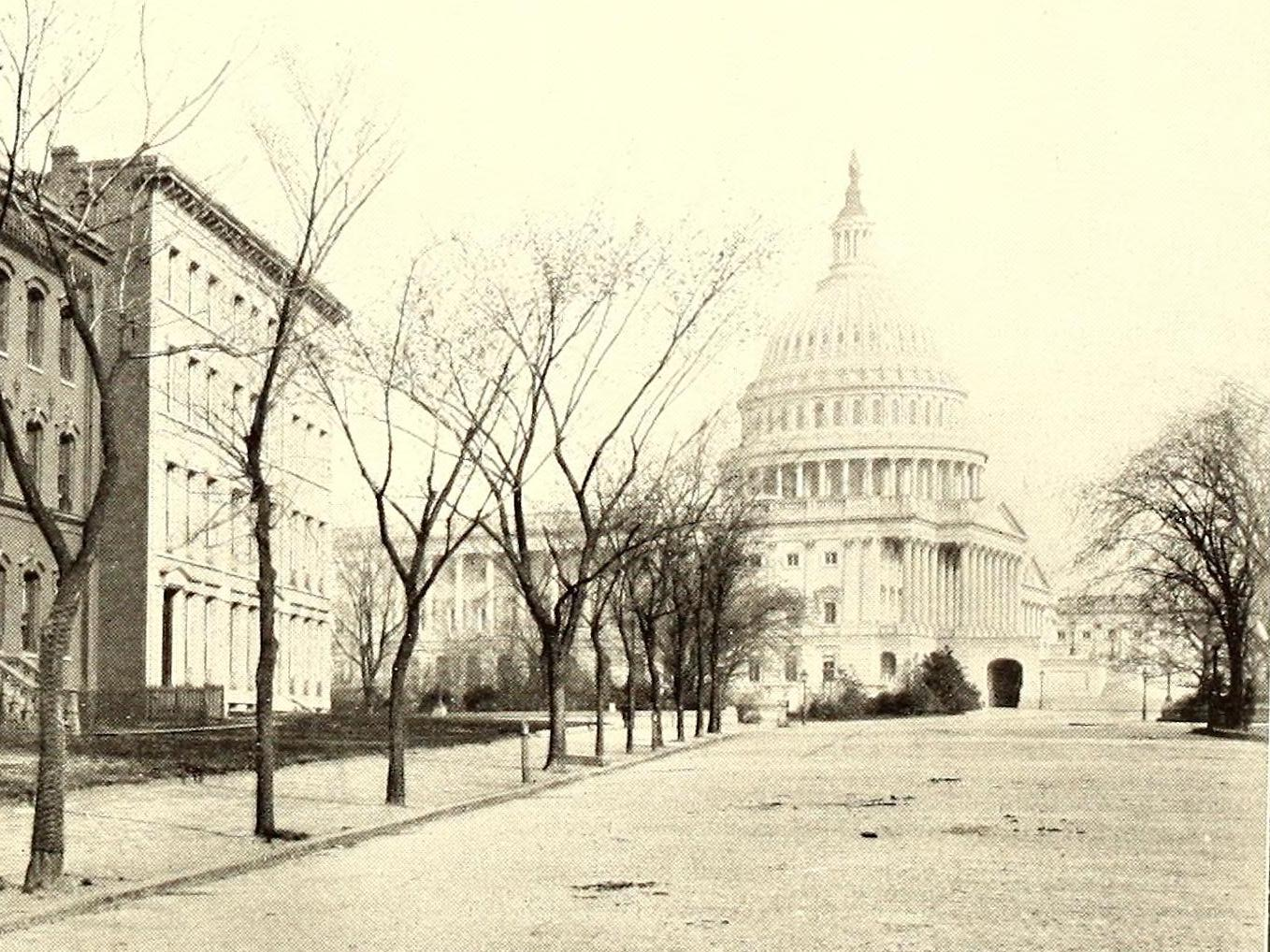
The side of the Butler Building at left, looking towards the United States Capitol in 1902

The Butler Building was a mansion in Washington, D.C., constructed by Benjamin Franklin Butler. It served as the headquarters of the U.S. Marine Hospital Service and its successor, the Public Health Service, from 1891 until 1929. It also contained a purpose-built fireproof unit to store archives of the United States Coast and Geodetic Survey. It was demolished in 1929 to construct the Longworth House Office Building.

== Architecture ==
The building contained three units, one specifically constructed as a fireproof storage space. The other two were built as residences, and later were converted to office space. It was directly to the south of the United States Capitol, across what is now Independence Avenue.

It was constructed of granite from Cape Ann, Massachusetts. It had brick partition walls and a deep foundation sitting 30 ft (9.1 m) below the street line. In 1888, it had 37 rooms. The residential units had hardwood finishing, parquet oak floors, and frescos on most walls and ceilings. The stairways and corridors included wainscot paneling. There were also artistic chandeliers and fireplaces. The fireproof unit had iron doors and window shutters, with wood used sparingly.

== History ==
=== Residence ===
The building was built as the home of Massachusetts Congressman and former Union general Benjamin Franklin Butler in 1873–1874. Butler had purchased the land at auction to develop it. As the land was directly north of the Richards Building, the headquarters of the United States Coast and Geodetic Survey, its superintendent requested that a portion of the building be constructed to be fireproof so that it could be rented as storage for valuable and irreplaceable survey records, maps, and engraving plates. After its construction, Butler said, "it is certified to be the best fireproof structure that has ever been erected in this city, or I think in any other".

The building was used by President Chester A. Arthur while the White House was being refurnished, in a unit rented at the time by Senator John P. Jones.

=== Government office ===
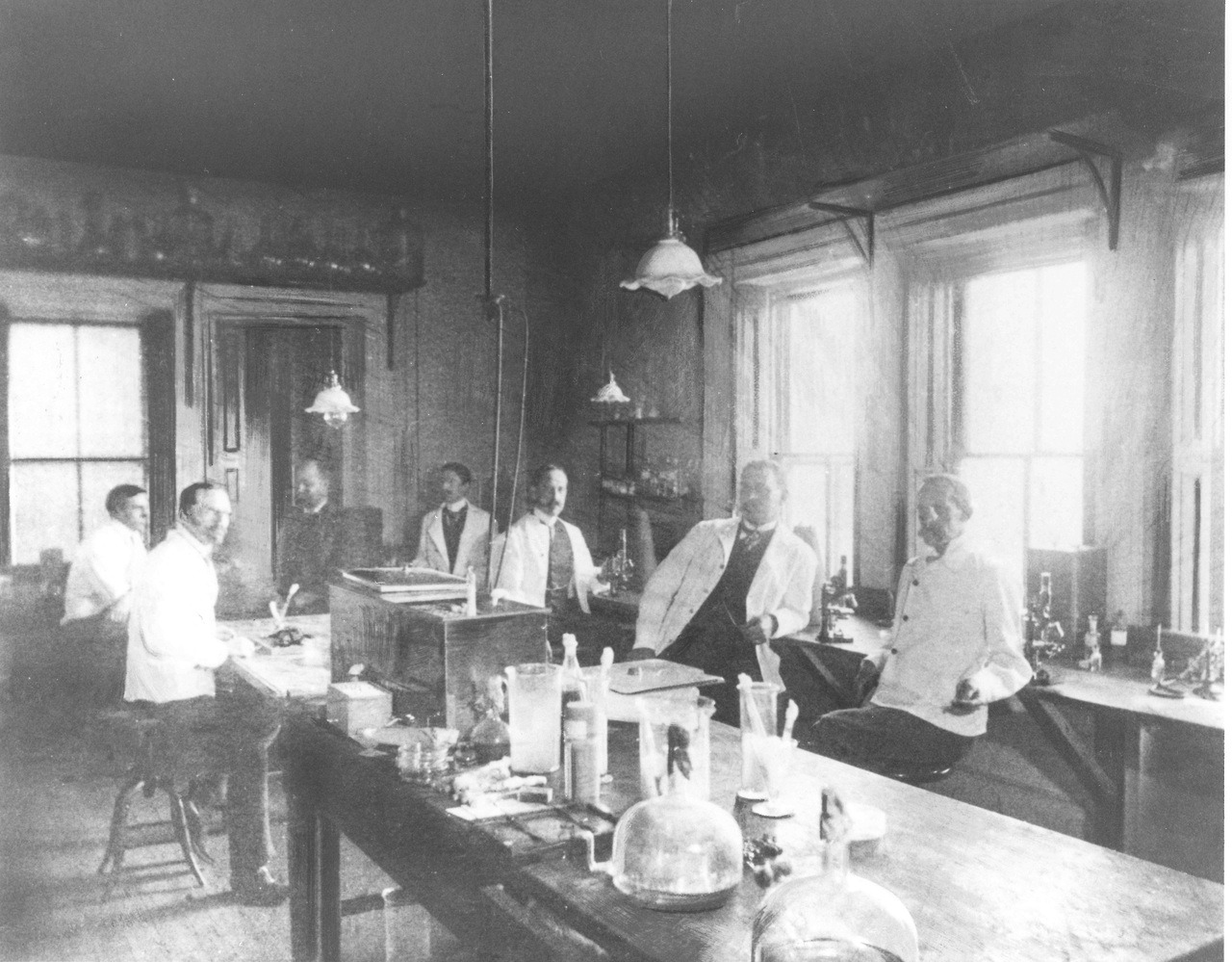
The laboratory of the Hygienic Laboratory, a predecessor of the National Institutes of Health, in the top floor of the Butler Building around 1899

In 1888, the building was considered for purchase by the government for Congressional offices. On April 10, 1891, the Department of the Treasury purchased the building from Butler for $275,000. That year, the Marine Hospital Service moved its headquarters from a building at 1308 F Street NW. It occupied the unit facing north onto B Street towards the Capitol. The Coast and Geodetic Survey occupied the other two units to its south, including the previously rented archives unit, with the second unit used for a library and offices.

The Marine Hospital Service's Hygienic Laboratory, the predecessor of the National Institutes of Health, also moved to the building from the New York Marine Hospital in 1891. It occupied the top floor of the building. In March 1904, the Hygienic Laboratory moved to a new building at the Old Naval Observatory.

In 1912, the Marine Hospital Service became the Public Health Service. Some of the building's interior ornamentation was removed in the early 1910s.

The Public Health Service moved out of the building in April 1929. Temporary Building C on the National Mall, where it had offices since 1920, became its temporary headquarters until the new Public Health Service Building opened in May 1933. The Coast and Geodetic Survey moved to the Department of Commerce Building also in 1929. The Butler Building was then demolished to construct the Longworth House Office Building. Surgeon General Hugh S. Cumming attempted to have the mantles and mirrors stored for use in a future building but was unsuccessful as the items were lost.
