= Cannon House Office Building =

Government building in Washington, D.C.

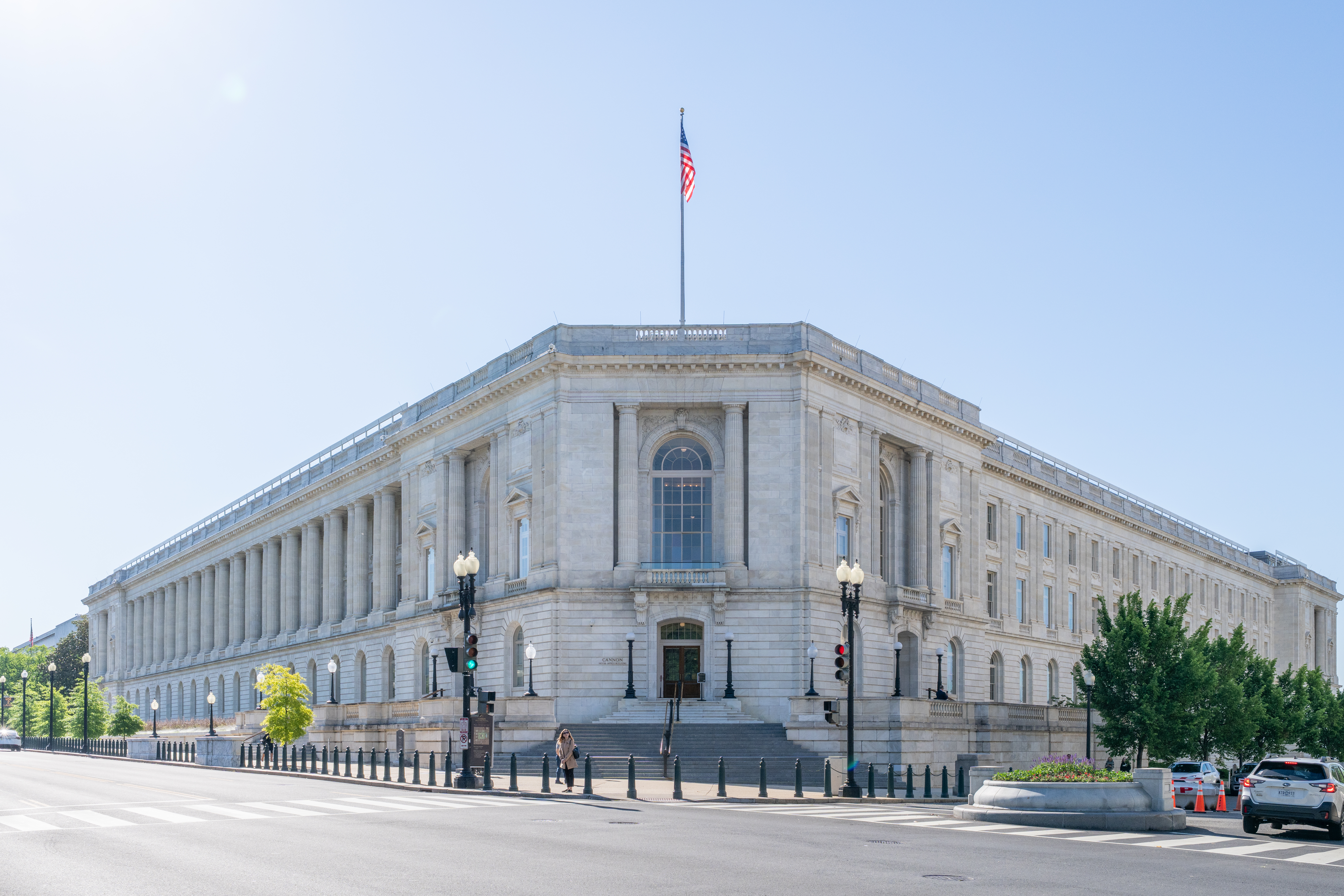
- The Cannon House Office Building viewed from near Independence Avenue and New Jersey Avenue SE (2026)

- Location within Central Washington, D.C.
- Former names: House Office Building

General information
- Status: Completed
- Architectural style: Beaux-Arts
- Location: United States Capitol Complex, Washington, D.C., United States
- Coordinates: 38°53′13″N 77°00′25″W
- Completed: 1908; 118 years ago
- Opened: December 12, 1908; 117 years ago

Technical details
- Material: Marble
- Floor count: 5

Design and construction
- Architecture firm: Carrère and Hastings

D.C. Inventory of Historic Sites
- Designated: November 8, 1964
- Reference no.: 290

The Cannon House Office Building (often called the "Old House Office Building"), completed in 1908, is the oldest office building of the United States Congress in Washington, D.C. A significant example of the Beaux-Arts style of architecture, it occupies a site south of the United States Capitol bounded by Independence Avenue, First Street, New Jersey Avenue, and C Street S.E. In 1962 the building was named for former Speaker of the United States House of Representatives Joseph Gurney Cannon.

== History ==
The first congressional office buildings were constructed immediately after the turn of the 20th century to relieve overcrowding in the interior of the then century-old United States Capitol. Previously, members who wanted office space had to rent quarters or borrow space in committee rooms. In March 1901, Congress authorized Architect of the Capitol Edward Clark (1822–1902, served 1865–1902), to draw plans for fireproof office buildings for both the House and Senate adjacent north and south to the Capitol grounds. By two years later, in March 1903, the acquisition of land for sites, razing of the private residences and businesses and construction of the buildings were authorized. In April 1904, the prominent New York City architectural firm of Carrère and Hastings was retained. Thomas Hastings (1860–1929), took charge of the southside House Office Building project, while John Carrère (1858–1911), oversaw the construction of an almost identical office building (now named the Russell Senate Office Building) for the United States Senate to the north. Their Beaux Arts / Classical Revival styles of architecture designs were restrained complementary to the original Capitol of 1792–1863.

The Cannon Building was occupied during the session of the 60th U.S. Congress in December 1907. By less than a decade later in 1913, however, the House had already outgrown the available office space, and fifty-one rooms were added to the original structure by raising the roof and constructing a fifth floor (not visible in its exterior view). (Note: Technically in Classical architecture, an attic.) that is visible only from the enclosed court and otherwise obscured on the building's exterior public face. Originally there were 397 offices and fourteen committee rooms in the Cannon Building; the subsequent second 1932 remodeling project resulted in 85 two- or three-room suites, 10 single rooms, and 23 committee rooms. During the late 1960s, the House Beauty Shop, a salon which catered to Congresspersons, their spouses, and employees, was relocated to the Cannon House Office Building from the adjacent smaller and newer Longworth House Office Building of 1930–1933, under the auspices of the House of Representatives Beauty Shop Committee.

=== 2015 renovations ===
In January 2015, a top-to-bottom renovation of the Cannon House Office Building began. Completion is expected to take ten years and cost $752.7 million. Initially, this renovation project will be focused on upgrading the building infrastructure and utilities, but will progress on to a wing-by-wing exterior and interior reconstruction. According to Bill Weidemeyer (Superintendent of the House), the building "is plagued by safety, health, environmental and operational issues that are rapidly worsening. Many of the building’s systems are original from the 1908 construction."

As of the early 2020s, renovation work has proceeded in phased construction zones, with Members of Congress temporarily relocated to other House office buildings during active work. The project includes seismic reinforcement, asbestos abatement, accessibility upgrades, and modernization of mechanical systems while preserving historic architectural elements.

== Architecture ==
Architecturally, the elevations are divided into a rusticated base and a colonnade with an entablature and balustrade. The colonnades with thirty-four Doric columns that face the Capitol are echoed by pilasters on the sides of the building, and very inspired by the Louvre Colonnade in Paris. The Cannon Building is faced with marble and limestone; while the Senate's Russell Building's base and terrace are gray granite.

Modern for its time, the building initially included such facilities as forced-air ventilation systems, steam heat, individual lavatories with hot and cold running water and ice water, telephones, and electricity. Both the Cannon Building and the Russell Building are connected to the Capitol by underground passages.

Of special architectural interest is the rotunda. Eighteen Corinthian columns support an entablature and a coffered dome, whose glazed oculus floods the rotunda with natural light. Twin marble staircases lead from the rotunda to an imposing Caucus Room, which features Corinthian pilasters, a full entablature, and a richly detailed ceiling.

== Cannon Tunnel ==
The north-south Cannon Tunnel connects the Cannon House Office Building to the Capitol. The tunnel is lined with artwork from the annual Congressional Art Competition for high school students. Branching off the entrance to the Cannon Tunnel is a separate tunnel southwest to the adjacent Longworth House Office Building, and entrances to a cafeteria, shoe shiner/cobbler, and a Legislative Resource Center. Unlike the tunnels from the Capitol to the Senate Office Buildings on the northside and the Rayburn Tunnel, the Cannon Tunnel because of its age, has no subway line, and is primarily a pedestrian pathway. In addition, a separate tunnel runs between the Cannon building and to the east of the neighboring James Madison Memorial Building, a part of the adjacent Library of Congress buildings complex.

== Representatives with Cannon offices ==
Name	Party	District	Room
Robert Aderholt	R	Alabama 4	Room 272
Pete Aguilar	D	California 33	Room 108
Mark Alford	R	Missouri 4	Room 328
Rick Allen	R	Georgia 12	Room 462
Mark Amodei	R	Nevada 2	Room 104
Michael Baumgartner	R	Washington 5	Room 124
Nick Begich III	R	Alaska at-large	Room 153
Cliff Bentz	R	Oregon 2	Room 409
Ami Bera	D	California 6	Room 172
Jack Bergman	R	Michigan 1	Room 566
Andy Biggs	R	Arizona 5	Room 464
Mike Bost	R	Illinois 12	Room 352
Josh Brecheen	R	Oklahoma 2	Room 351
Troy Carter	D	Louisiana 2	Room 442
Greg Casar	D	Texas 35	Room 446
Juan Ciscomani	R	Arizona 6	Room 461
Michael Cloud	R	Texas 27	Room 304
Jim Clyburn	D	South Carolina 6	Room 274
Andrew Clyde	R	Georgia 9	Room 445
Eli Crane	R	Arizona 2	Room 307
Dan Crenshaw	R	Texas 2	Room 248
Madeleine Dean	D	Pennsylvania 4	Room 150
Mario Díaz-Balart	R	Florida 26	Room 374
Debbie Dingell	D	Michigan 6	Room 102
Neal Dunn	R	Florida 2	Room 466
Tom Emmer	R	Minnesota 6	Room 326
Mike Ezell	R	Mississippi 4	Room 443
Shomari Figures	D	Alabama 2	Room 225
Randy Fine	R	Florida 6	Room 244
Brian Fitzpatrick	R	Pennsylvania 1	Room 271
Mike Flood	R	Nebraska 1	Room 343
Vince Fong	R	California 20	Room 243
Russell Fry	R	South Carolina 7	Room 345
James Gallagher	R	California 1	Room 408
Robert Garcia	D	California 42	Room 109
Laura Gillen	D	New York 4	Room 428
Carlos Giménez	R	Florida 28	Room 448
Dan Goldman	D	New York 10	Room 245
Jimmy Gomez	D	California 34	Room 506
Maggie Goodlander	D	New Hampshire 2	Room 223
Josh Gottheimer	D	New Jersey 5	Room 106
Michael Guest	R	Mississippi 3	Room 450
Josh Harder	D	California 9	Room 209
Mark Harris	R	North Carolina 8	Room 126
Diana Harshbarger	R	Tennessee 1	Room 167
Kevin Hern	R	Oklahoma 1	Room 171
Clay Higgins	R	Louisiana 3	Room 572
Steven Horsford	D	Nevada 4	Room 406
Erin Houchin	R	Indiana 9	Room 342
Ronny Jackson	R	Texas 13	Room 125
Julie Johnson	D	Texas 32	Room 221
Mike Johnson	R	Louisiana 4	Room 521
Sydney Kamlager-Dove	D	California 37	Room 144
Thomas Kean Jr.	R	New Jersey 7	Room 251
Tim Kennedy	D	New York 26	Room 423
Ro Khanna	D	California 17	Room 306
Jen Kiggans	R	Virginia 2	Room 152
Kimberlyn King-Hinds	R	Northern Mariana Islands at-large	Room 425
David Kustoff	R	Tennessee 8	Room 560
Darin LaHood	R	Illinois 16	Room 503
Nick LaLota	R	New York 1	Room 122
Nick Langworthy	R	New York 23	Room 422
Mike Lawler	R	New York 17	Room 324
Susie Lee	D	Nevada 3	Room 365
Julia Letlow	R	Louisiana 5	Room 142
Anna Paulina Luna	R	Florida 13	Room 226
Morgan Luttrell	R	Texas 8	Room 444
Ryan Mackenzie	R	Pennsylvania 7	Room 121
Seth Magaziner	D	Rhode Island 2	Room 252
Celeste Maloy	R	Utah 2	Room 249
Tracey Mann	R	Kansas 1	Room 344
Lisa McClain	R	Michigan 9	Room 562
Jim McGovern	D	Massachusetts 2	Room 370
LaMonica McIver	D	New Jersey 10	Room 426
Dan Meuser	R	Pennsylvania 9	Room 350
Carol Miller	R	West Virginia 1	Room 465
Max Miller	R	Ohio 7	Room 143
Mariannette Miller-Meeks	R	Iowa 1	Room 504
Cory Mills	R	Florida 7	Room 346
John Moolenaar	R	Michigan 2	Room 246
Joseph Morelle	D	New York 25	Room 570
Jared Moskowitz	D	Florida 23	Room 242
James Moylan	R	Guam at-large	Room 228
Greg Murphy	R	North Carolina 3	Room 407
Richard Neal	D	Massachusetts 1	Room 372
Dan Newhouse	R	Washington 4	Room 460
Ralph Norman	R	South Carolina 5	Room 569
Alexandria Ocasio-Cortez	D	New York 14	Room 250
Andy Ogles	R	Tennessee 5	Room 151
Burgess Owens	R	Utah 4	Room 309
Gary Palmer	R	Alabama 6	Room 170
Jimmy Panetta	D	California 19	Room 200
Chris Pappas	D	New Hampshire 1	Room 452
Brittany Pettersen	D	Colorado 7	Room 348
Ayanna Pressley	D	Massachusetts 7	Room 402
Josh Riley	D	New York 19	Room 128
Chip Roy	R	Texas 21	Room 103
Michael Rulli	R	Ohio 6	Room 421
Andrea Salinas	D	Oregon 6	Room 403
Brad Schneider	D	Illinois 10	Room 300
David Schweikert	R	Arizona 1	Room 166
Jefferson Shreve	R	Indiana 6	Room 224
Adrian Smith	R	Nebraska 3	Room 502
Lloyd Smucker	R	Pennsylvania 11	Room 302
Greg Stanton	D	Arizona 4	Room 207
Pete Stauber	R	Minnesota 8	Room 145
Dale Strong	R	Alabama 5	Room 449
Marlin Stutzman	R	Indiana 3	Room 404
Tom Suozzi	D	New York 3	Room 203
David Taylor	R	Ohio 2	Room 325
Shri Thanedar	D	Michigan 13	Room 154
Glenn Thompson	R	Pennsylvania 15	Room 400
Mike Thompson	R	California 4	Room 268
Tom Tiffany	R	Wisconsin 7	Room 451
William Timmons	R	South Carolina 4	Room 267
Gabe Vasquez	D	New Mexico 2	Room 322
Debbie Wasserman Schultz	D	Florida 25	Room 270
Bonnie Watson Coleman	D	New Jersey 12	Room 168
Randy Weber	R	Texas 14	Room 107
Bruce Westerman	R	Arkansas 4	Room 202
Tony Wied	R	Wisconsin 8	Room 424
Rudy Yakym	R	Indiana 2	Room 349
Ryan Zinke	R	Montana 1	Room 512

== Gallery ==
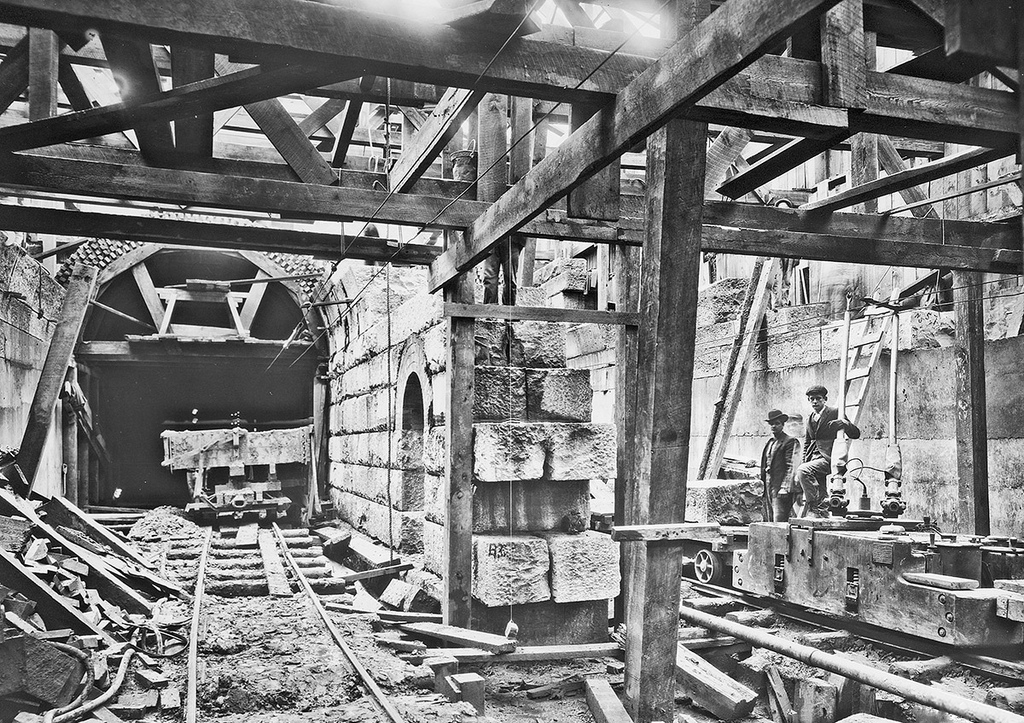
Construction of Cannon Tunnel, north-south from Capitol to Cannon Building, c. 1904

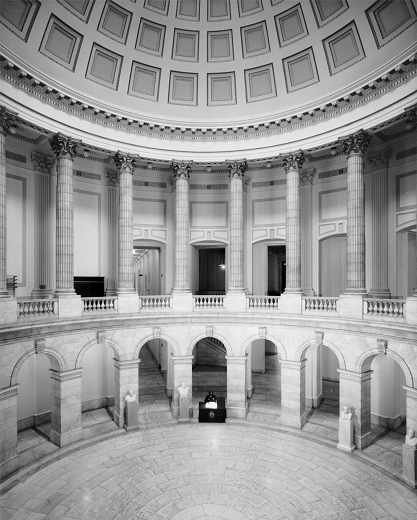
Cannon Building rotunda

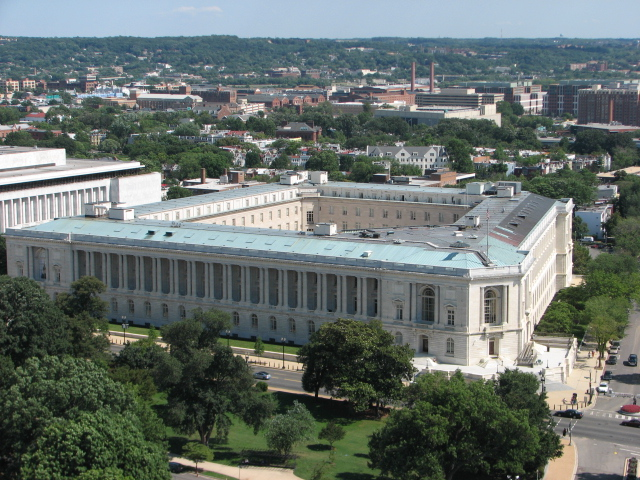
Aerial view looking southeast of Cannon House of Representatives Office Building from Capitol dome

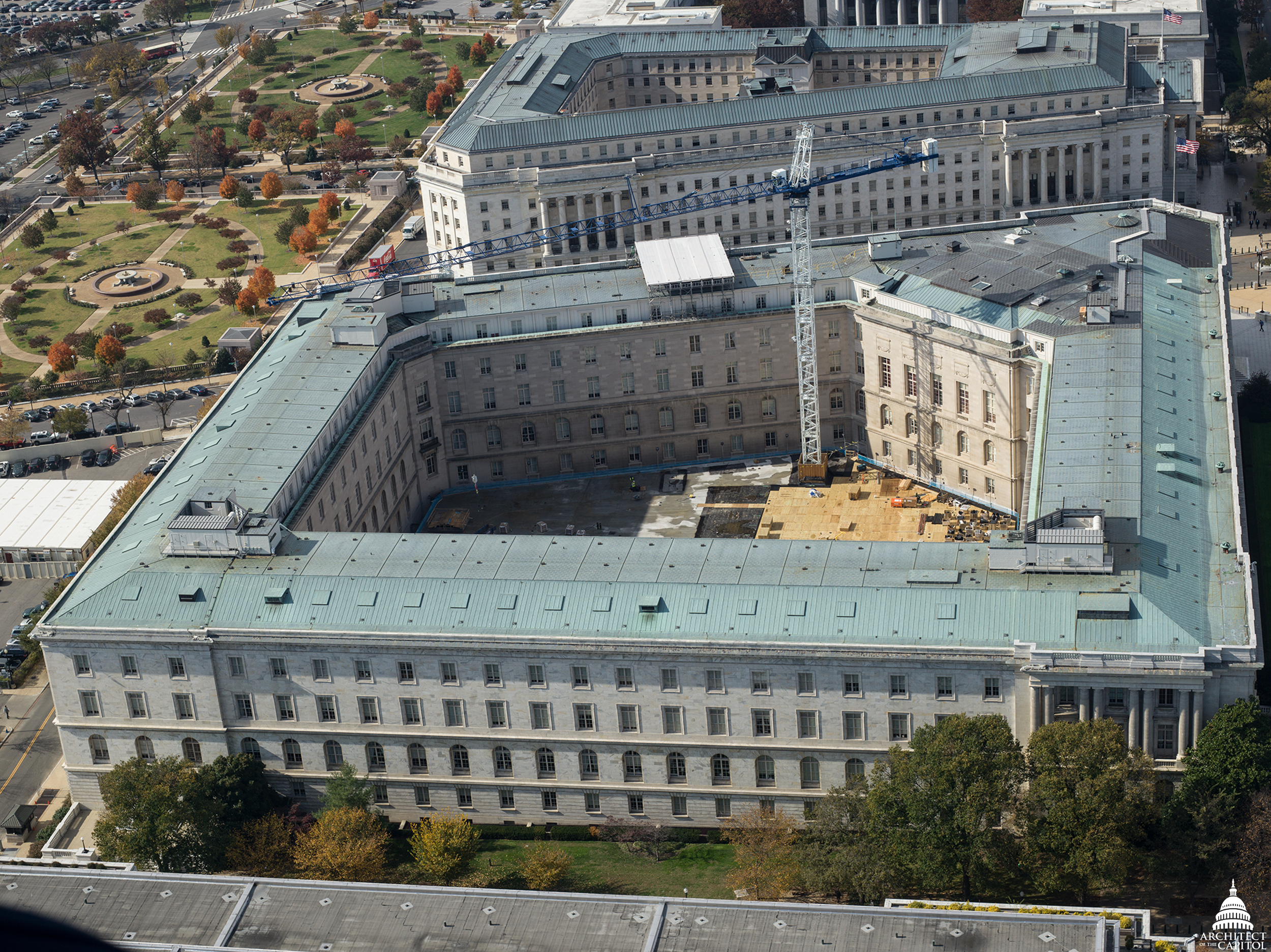
Aerial view looking west (Capitol at right / north, out of view) of the Cannon House Office Building in 2015 while undergoing latest renovation (scaffold crane in center courtyard). Longworth House Office Building adjacent and further west at top of photo. Rayburn House Office Building barely seen at photo top to the far west.
