= Longworth House Office Building =

Government building in Washington, D.C.

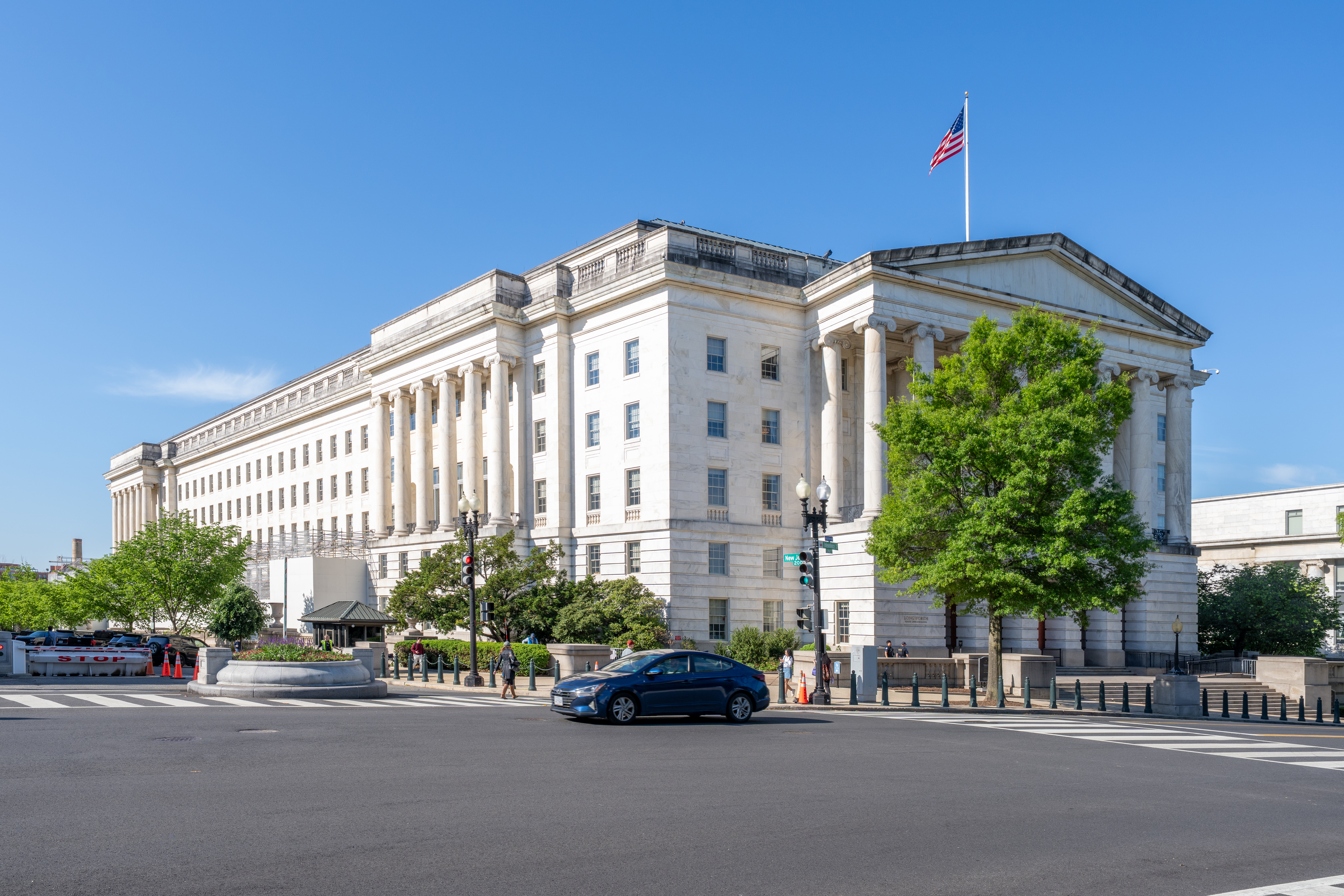
- The Longworth House Office Building (c. 2026)

- Location within Central Washington, D.C.

General information
- Status: Completed
- Architectural style: Neoclassical
- Location: 1100 Longworth, United States Capitol Complex, Washington, D.C., United States
- Coordinates: 38°53′12.48″N 77°0′30.6″W
- Opened: April 1933; 93 years ago

Technical details
- Material: Marble
- Grounds: 702,608 square feet (65,274.4 m^{2})

Design and construction
- Architects: Frank Upman, Gilbert LaCoste Rodier, Nathan C. Wyeth and Louis Justemente
- Architecture firm: Allied Architects of Washington

The Longworth House Office Building (LHOB) is one of five office buildings used by the United States House of Representatives. The building is located south of the Capitol, bounded by Independence Avenue, New Jersey Avenue, C Street S.E., and South Capitol Street, in southeast Washington. It has a floor area of 599,675 square feet (55,711.6 m^{2}) and has a total of 251 congressional offices and suites, five large committee rooms, seven small committee rooms, a large assembly room in which the House Ways and Means Committee assembles, and a secondary office or headquarters' annex for the Government Accountability Office.

The building was named in 1962 in honor of former speaker of the House Nicholas Longworth of Ohio, who served as speaker from 1925 until the Republicans lost their majority in 1931. He died that year, and the building was authorized the same year.

== Description ==
With a floor area of just under 600,000 square feet (56,000 m^{2}), it is the smallest of the House office buildings.

"Because of its position on a sloping site, the rusticated base of the Longworth Building varies in height from two to four stories. Above this granite base stand the three principal floors, which are faced with white marble. Ionic columns supporting a well-proportioned entablature are used for the building's five porticoes, the principal one of which is topped by a pediment. Two additional stories are partially hidden by a marble balustrade. It presents a somewhat more restrained appearance than the neighboring Cannon Building, which was designed in the more theatrical Beaux Arts style. The Longworth Building takes its place along with the National Gallery of Art (1941) and the Jefferson Memorial (1943) as one of Washington's best examples of the Neo-classical Revival style".

== History ==
=== Construction ===
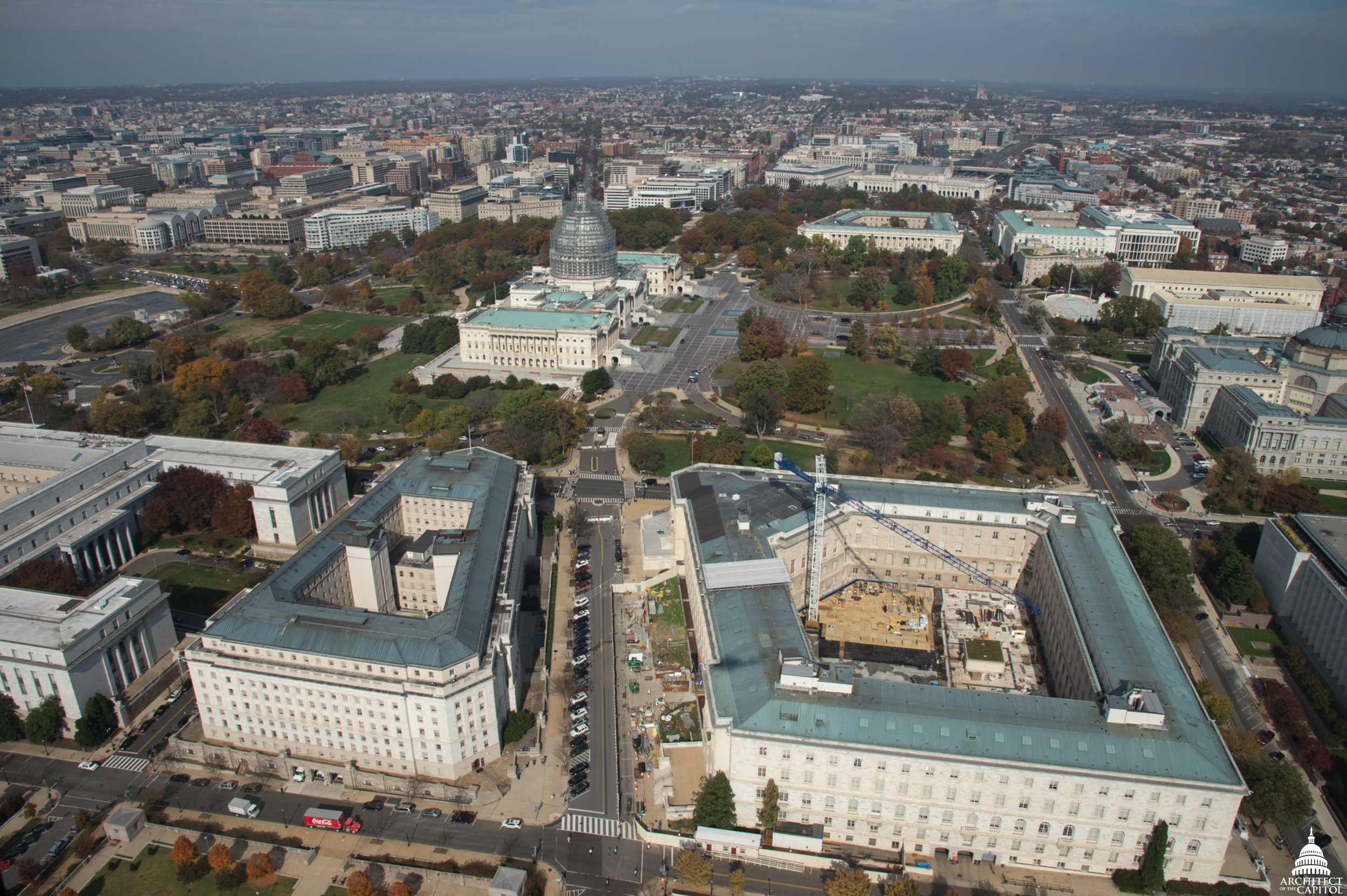
The Longworth Building (center) is located between the Rayburn Building (left, partial view) and Cannon Building (Right)

Plans to provide the House of Representatives with a second office building were begun in 1925. Severe overcrowding in the Cannon House Office Building (completed in 1908) led to the renovation of the Cannon Building and the construction of the Longworth Building.

Under the direction of Architect of the Capitol David Lynn, preliminary designs for the building were prepared by a local firm known as The Allied Architects of Washington Inc. The principal architects were Frank Upman, Gilbert LaCoste Rodier, Nathan C. Wyeth, and Louis Justemente. They produced two schemes for a simple, dignified building in harmony with the rest of the Capitol Complex. In January 1929 Congress authorized $8.4 million for acquiring and clearing the site and for constructing the new building. The foundations were completed in December 1930, and the building was accepted for occupancy in April 1933.

The site of the building had previously been occupied by the Butler Building, which was the headquarters of the United States Public Health Service, and the Richards Building, the headquarters of the United States Coast and Geodetic Survey, which both were demolished.

=== Later history ===
The large assembly room of the Longworth Building, which seats 450 people, was designated as the meeting room for the House Ways and Means Committee in 1938. It was also used by the House of Representatives as their primary meeting room in 1949 and 1950 while its chamber in the United States Capitol was being remodeled. In the 1960s, the House Beauty Shop, a salon which catered to Members of Congress, their spouses, and employees, was relocated to the Cannon House Office Building from the smaller Longworth House Office Building under the auspices of the Beauty Shop Committee. During the period prior to the passing of the Tax Reform Act of 1986, The Washington Post reported that the "long, polished hallway outside 1100 Longworth" had become "known among this subculture of Washington as 'Gucci Gulch,' nicknamed for the high-priced footwear of tax lobbyists who camped out regularly during the 1986 tax debate".

== Representatives with Longworth offices ==
Name	Party	District	Room
Gabe Amo	D	Rhode Island 1	Room 1119
Yassamin Ansari	D	Arizona 3	Room 1432
Jodey Arrington	R	Texas 19	Room 1111
Jake Auchincloss	D	Massachusetts 4	Room 1524
Becca Balint	D	Vermont at-large	Room 1510
Tom Barrett	R	Michigan 7	Room 1232
Wesley Bell	D	Missouri 1	Room 1429
Don Beyer	D	Virginia 8	Room 1226
Sheri Biggs	R	South Carolina 3	Room 1530
Lauren Boebert	R	Colorado 4	Room 1713
Brendan Boyle	D	Pennsylvania 2	Room 1502
Rob Bresnahan	R	Pennsylvania 8	Room 1133
Nikki Budzinski	D	Illinois 13	Room 1717
Tim Burchett	R	Tennessee 2	Room 1122
Eric Burlison	R	Missouri 7	Room 1108
Janelle Bynum	D	Oregon 5	Room 1508
Mike Carey	R	Ohio 15	Room 1433
Herb Conaway	D	New Jersey 3	Room 1022
Jeff Crank	D	Colorado 5	Room 1029
Jasmine Crockett	D	Texas 30	Room 1616
Jason Crow	D	Colorado 6	Room 1323
Don Davis	D	North Carolina 1	Room 1123
Monica De La Cruz	R	Texas 15	Room 1415
Chris Deluzio	D	Pennsylvania 17	Room 1222
Maxine Dexter	D	Oregon 3	Room 1207
Byron Donalds	R	Florida 19	Room 1710
Troy Downing	R	Montana 2	Room 1529
Chuck Edwards	R	North Carolina 11	Room 1505
Sarah Elfreth	D	Maryland 3	Room 1213
Jake Ellzey	R	Texas 6	Room 1721
Dwight Evans	D	Pennsylvania 3	Room 1105
Gabe Evans	R	Colorado 8	Room 1229
Julie Fedorchak	R	North Dakota at-large	Room 1607
Laura Friedman	D	California 30	Room 1517
Maxwell Frost	D	Florida 10	Room 1224
Russ Fulcher	R	Idaho 1	Room 1514
Brandon Gill	R	Texas 26	Room 1305
Jared Golden	D	Maine 2	Room 1107
Craig Goldman	R	Texas 12	Room 1716
Vicente Gonzalez	D	Texas 34	Room 1201
Sam Graves	R	Missouri 6	Room 1135
Adam Gray	D	California 13	Room 1230
Adelita Grijalva	D	Arizona 7	Room 1203
Glenn Grothman	R	Wisconsin 6	Room 1211
Harriet Hageman	R	Wyoming at-large	Room 1227
Abraham Hamadeh	R	Arizona 8	Room 1722
Mike Haridopolos	R	Florida 8	Room 1039
Pat Harrigan	R	North Carolina 10	Room 1233
Andy Harris	R	Maryland 1	Room 1536
Pablo Hernández	D	Puerto Rico	Room 1419
French Hill	R	Arkansas 2	Room 1533
Chrissy Houlahan	D	Pennsylvania 6	Room 1727
Steny Hoyer	D	Maryland 5	Room 1705
Val Hoyle	D	Oregon 4	Room 1620
Wesley Hunt	R	Texas 38	Room 1520
Jeff Hurd	R	Colorado 3	Room 1641
Glenn Ivey	D	Maryland 4	Room 1610
Brian Jack	R	Georgia 3	Room 1320
Jonathan Jackson	D	Illinois 1	Room 1632
John James	R	Michigan 10	Room 1519
Dusty Johnson	R	South Dakota at-large	Room 1714
Mike Kelly	R	Pennsylvania 16	Room 1707
Mike Kennedy	R	Utah 3	Room 1626
Brad Knott	R	North Carolina 13	Room 1239
John B. Larson	D	Connecticut 1	Room 1501
George Latimer	D	New York 16	Room 1507
Sam Liccardo	D	California 16	Room 1117
Zoe Lofgren	D	California 18	Room 1401
Nancy Mace	R	South Carolina 1	Room 1728
Nicole Malliotakis	R	New York 11	Room 1124
John Mannion	D	New York 22	Room 1516
Sarah McBride	D	Delaware at-large	Room 1306
April McClain Delaney	D	Maryland 6	Room 1130
Jennifer McClellan	D	Virginia 4	Room 1628
Rich McCormick	R	Georgia 7	Room 1719
Kristen McDonald Rivet	D	Michigan 8	Room 1408
Addison McDowell	R	North Carolina 6	Room 1032
Morgan McGarvey	D	Kentucky 3	Room 1527
John McGuire	R	Virginia 5	Room 1013
Analilia Mejia	D	New Jersey 11	Room 1427
Christian Menefee	D	Texas 18	Room 1318
Mark Messmer	R	Indiana 8	Room 1208
Mary Miller	R	Illinois 15	Room 1740
Dave Min	D	California 47	Room 1034
Barry Moore	R	Alabama 1	Room 1511
Blake Moore	R	Utah 1	Room 1131
Riley Moore	R	West Virginia 2	Room 1337
Tim Moore	R	North Carolina 14	Room 1424
Nathaniel Moran	R	Texas 1	Room 1605
Kelly Morrison	D	Minnesota 3	Room 1205
Seth Moulton	D	Massachusetts 6	Room 1126
Kevin Mullin	D	California 15	Room 1404
Troy Nehls	R	Texas 22	Room 1104
Zach Nunn	R	Iowa 3	Room 1410
Johnny Olszewski	D	Maryland 2	Room 1339
Ilhan Omar	D	Minnesota 5	Room 1730
Bob Onder	R	Missouri 3	Room 1113
Nancy Pelosi	D	California 11	Room 1236
Marie Gluesenkamp Perez	D	Washington 3	Room 1431
Mark Pocan	D	Wisconsin 2	Room 1026
Nellie Pou	D	New Jersey 9	Room 1007
Delia Ramirez	D	Illinois 3	Room 1523
Emily Randall	D	Washington 6	Room 1531
Luz Rivas	D	California 29	Room 1319
Deborah Ross	D	North Carolina 2	Room 1221
John Rutherford	R	Florida 5	Room 1711
Pat Ryan	R	New York 18	Room 1708
Mary Gay Scanlon	D	Pennsylvania 5	Room 1214
Derek Schmidt	R	Kansas 2	Room 1223
Hillary Scholten	D	Michigan 3	Room 1317
Kim Schrier	D	Washington 8	Room 1110
Keith Self	R	Texas 3	Room 1030
Terri Sewell	D	Alabama 7	Room 1035
Lateefah Simon	D	California 12	Room 1023
Jason Smith	R	Missouri 8	Room 1011
Eric Sorensen	D	Illinois 17	Room 1314
Victoria Spartz	R	Indiana 5	Room 1609
Melanie Stansbury	D	New Mexico 1	Room 1421
Bryan Steil	R	Wisconsin 1	Room 1526
Marilyn Strickland	D	Washington 10	Room 1724
Suhas Subramanyam	D	Virginia 10	Room 1009
Emilia Sykes	D	Ohio 13	Room 1217
Jill Tokuda	D	Hawaii 2	Room 1027
Ritchie Torres	D	New York 15	Room 1414
Derek Tran	D	California 45	Room 1127
Beth Van Duyne	R	Texas 24	Room 1725
Derrick Van Orden	R	Wisconsin 3	Room 1513
Eugene Vindman	D	Virginia 7	Room 1005
George Whitesides	D	California 27	Room 1504
Nikema Williams	D	Georgia 5	Room 1406
Joe Wilson	R	South Carolina 2	Room 1436
