= Congressional Institute =

US nonprofit organization

- Logo
- Formation: 1987; 39 years ago
- Founder: Jerry Climer
- Type: Nonprofit
- Purpose: Congressional efficacy and education
- Headquarters: Alexandria, Virginia
- Coordinates: 38.8058°N 77.0594°W
- Services: seminars and educational material
- President: Derek Harley
- Website: www.congressionalinstitute.org

The Congressional Institute is a nonprofit organization based in Alexandria, Virginia. The organization is best known for sponsoring an annual January retreat for Republican members of Congress. The organization also sponsors the Congressional Art Competition and publishes nonpartisan educational resources such as the House Floor Procedures Manual. It was founded in 1987 by Jerry Climer. The Institute's current president is Derek Harley.

== Overview ==
The Congressional Institute is a nonprofit organization based in Alexandria, Virginia that was founded in 1987 to encourage members of Congress to convene and discuss issues outside of congressional business or campaigning. It is known as sponsor of annual retreats for Republican members of Congress and for Republican staffers. The Congressional Institute's mission is: "dedicated to helping members of Congress better serve their constituents and helping their constituents better understand the operations of the national legislature".

Mark Strand, former chief of staff to former Sen. Jim Talent, became president of the Institute in 2007, succeeding founding president Jerry Climer. The organization’s Board of Directors is made up primarily of individuals who served in high-level congressional staff positions and lobbyists. The Institute receives its funding from annual dues paid by corporations and associations.

== Projects ==
=== Retreats ===
The Congressional Institute sponsors retreats for members of Congress and their staff. Starting in 1987, the Institute has organized with the Republican Conference an annual retreat held every January for all Republican members of Congress to focus on strategic planning. The first event was held in New York City over three days, partly as a commemoration of the 100th Congress.

According to the Institute, the annual retreat aims to provide a more relaxed environment for members of Congress to discuss policy and includes meetings on specific issues, workshops, panels, and informational sessions. Past speakers have included Presidents Barack Obama, George W. Bush, Donald Trump, Prime Ministers Theresa May and Tony Blair, Vice Presidents Mike Pence, Dan Quayle, and Dick Cheney, Senate Majority Leader Mitch McConnell, Speakers of the House Newt Gingrich and Paul Ryan, Mitt Romney, Frank Luntz, Peyton Manning, and Jay Leno.

Since 1993, members of Congress pay their own travel and lodging expenses, but the Institute pays for other expenses including staff costs as approved by the House or Senate Ethics Committees. Lobbyists have been barred from programming since 2006, though dues-paying members of the Institute are invited to a reception and dinner the final night of the retreat. In addition to the annual Republican retreat, the Institute sponsors Congressional staff training events and sponsored bipartisan retreats in the 1990s. The Institute partners with Harvard University’s Kennedy School of Government on the Bipartisan New Member Orientation, which is a 4-day conference held biannually in which new members of Congress are able to meet each other and learn about policy issues from academics, analysts, and former members of Congress.

=== Congress of Tomorrow Project ===
The Congressional Institute supports reform through an initiative called the "Congress of Tomorrow Project". The project calls for reform via a bipartisan joint committee and has put forth reform ideas including earmarking, biennial budgeting, and changing the start of the fiscal year to the start of the calendar year.

The organization supported a measure introduced in 2016 by U.S. Representatives Darin LaHood and Dan Lipinski that would create a bicameral panel with equal membership from both parties and equal numbers from the House and Senate to suggest reforms to improve the efficiency of the legislative body. This proposal is similar to reorganizations enacted in 1921, 1946, 1970, and 1993.

=== Congressional Art Competition ===
The Congressional Art Competition is an annual competition of two-dimensional visual artwork submitted by American high school students sponsored by the Congressional Institute. A winner is submitted from each congressional district by the district’s Member of Congress and displayed in the Cannon Tunnel at the United States Capitol for one year. C-SPAN described the display as "one of the largest and most well-known art displays on Capitol Hill". The bipartisan event has been held since 1982 and sponsored by the Congressional Institute since the mid-2000s. According to the Institute, 427 congressional offices participated in the competition in 2016 and approximately 30,000 students participate in the competition annually.

=== Bipartisan congressional debates ===
In 2008, the Congressional Institute joined the Democratic Leadership Council in co-hosting a bipartisan series of "Oxford style" congressional debates off of Capitol Hill. Each debate was moderated by a member of the media and featured four members of each party debating a specific policy topic. The debates' focus on issues was praised by The New York Times and participants, including then-Chairman of the House Democratic Caucus, Rahm Emanuel and then-House Republican Conference Chairman Adam Putnam.

=== Publications ===
In 2009, the Institute released, Surviving Inside Congress, a practical guide aimed at educating new and prospective congressional staff in the fundamentals of Congress and preparing them for positions on Capitol Hill. The book was written by Mark Strand, Michael S Johnson, and Jerry Climer. The Institute also publishes the House Floor Procedures Manual, and has released several studies. These include a study from 2007 on the benefits of "tele-town halls", a 2016 report on how the GOP could better connect to millennial voters, and a poll conducted by the Winston Group tracking congressional approval in 2016. As president of the Institute, Mark Strand has published views on congressional reform in op-eds, including in Time The Hill, and The Washington Times. Kelle Strickland became the third President and CEO, and the first woman to hold the position, in 2023.
