= Federal Reserve Board East Building =

Building in Washington, D.C.

- U.S. Public Health Service Building
- U.S. National Register of Historic Places
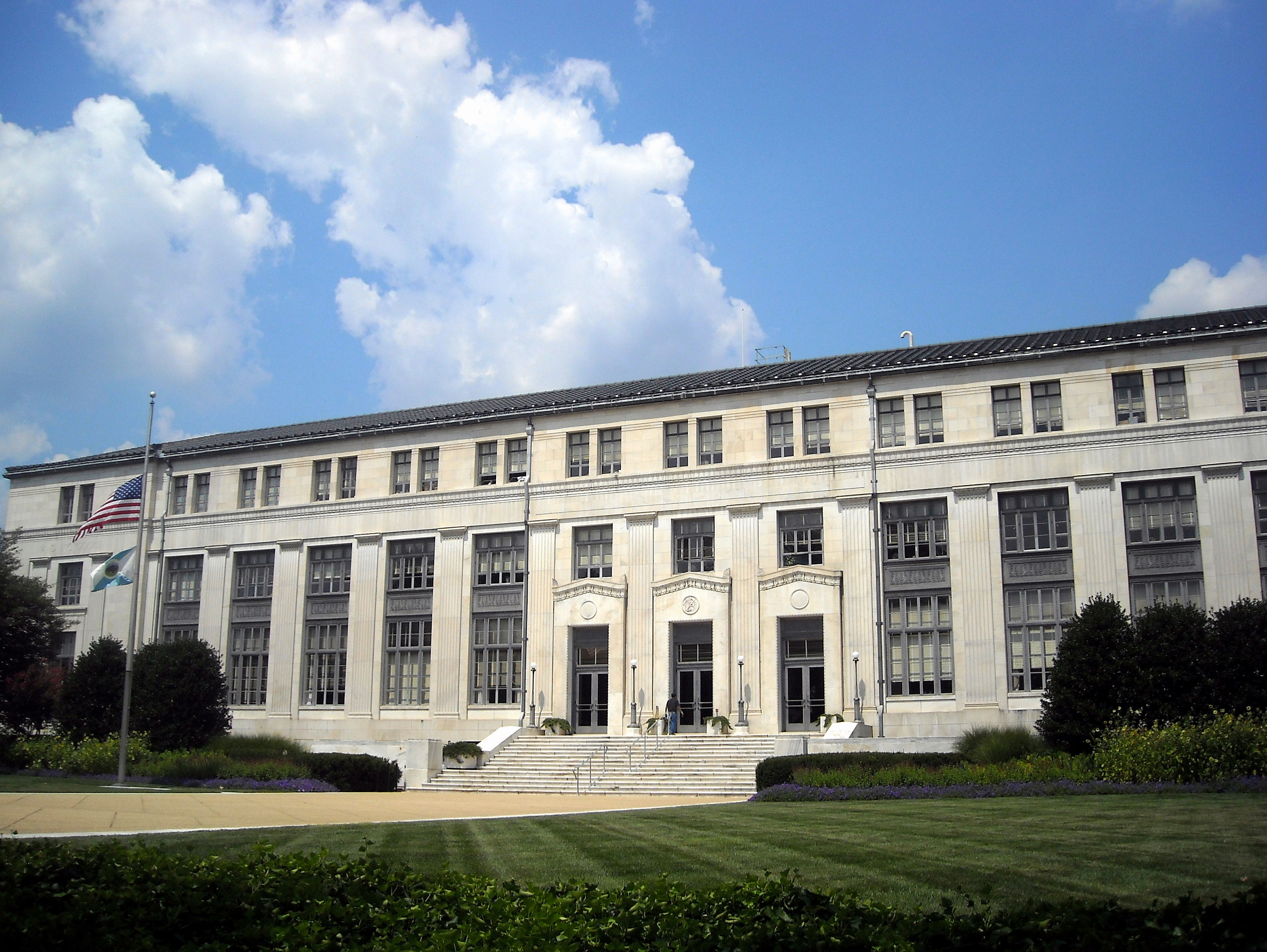
- Main entrance of the U.S. Public Health Service Building, 2008

- Location within Central Washington, D.C. Location within the District of Columbia Location within the United States
- Location: 1951 Constitution Avenue, NW, Washington, D.C.
- Coordinates: 38°53′34″N 77°2′39″W
- Area: 1 acre (0.40 ha)
- Built: 1931
- Architect: Jules Henri de Sibour; Office of the Supervising Architect
- Architectural style: Neoclassical
- NRHP reference No.: 07000641
- Added to NRHP: July 5, 2007

The Federal Reserve Board East Building, historically known as the U.S. Public Health Service Building after its initial tenant, is a historic government office building. It is located at 1951 Constitution Avenue Northwest, Washington, D.C., adjacent to the Federal Reserve Board's Eccles Building.

It was the headquarters of the U.S. Public Health Service during 1933–1942 and 1946–1947. During the intervening and following periods it was the headquarters of the Combined Chiefs of Staff, Atomic Energy Commission, and National Science Foundation. From 1965 until 2018, it was used by the Department of the Interior, most prominently as the headquarters of the Bureau of Indian Affairs and Office of Surface Mining, during which time it was known as the Department of the Interior South Building. In 2018, it was transferred to the Federal Reserve Board of Governors.

== History ==
=== Early history ===
The site was previously home to a YWCA.

The building was designed by Jules Henri de Sibour, for the Public Health Service in 1931. The Public Health service occupied it in May 1933, moving its headquarters from the Butler Building.

During World War II, the building was occupied by the Combined Chiefs of Staff. The Public Health Service vacated the building in February 1942, moving to a temporary building at the National Institutes of Health campus. The building was renamed to the Combined Chiefs of Staff Building on January 30, 1942. It was the site of the planning for the Manhattan Project. The Public Health Service then briefly reoccupied the building from January 1946 to March 1947, after which its headquarters moved to the Federal Security Building and the Federal Security Building South.

The Atomic Energy Commission occupied the site from its creation in 1947 until its relocation to Germantown, Maryland in 1958. From August 1958 until April 1965, it was the headquarters of the National Science Foundation.

=== Department of the Interior ===
The Bureau of Indian Affairs began using the building in April 1965, and Office of Surface Mining joined them in 1977. The building has since been used by several offices and bureaus of the Department of the Interior, which is headquartered next door in the Main Interior Building.

On November 3, 1972, a group of around 500 American Indians with the AIM took over the building, the culmination of their Trail of Broken Treaties walk. They intended to bring attention to American Indian issues, including their demands for renewed negotiation of treaties, enforcement of treaty rights and improvement in living standards. They occupied the Department of the Interior headquarters from November 3 to November 9, 1972.

=== Federal Reserve Board ===
In July 2018, the building was transferred to the Federal Reserve Board of Governors, whose headquarters, the Eccles Building, is across the street to the west. The building was planned to be renovated. The renovation attracted attention as an early test of the first Trump administration's efforts to promote neoclassical rather than modern architecture.

The renovation plan approved in 2021 would construct a new addition to the north of the existing structure with five stories above ground, and three below ground extending below 20th Street. The center wing of the original building would be demolished to enable a large skylight-covered atrium to be constructed in the center of the building. A new underground parking structure would be constructed to the south and west of the existing structure. Existing decorative cast aluminum ornamentation at the window openings would be retained and restored.

== Architectural description ==
The structure is a three-story E-shaped building featuring a raised basement, shallow projecting corner pavilions, and a gabled tile roof. The structural system is composed of a concealed steel frame and concrete floors. At the east, south, and west elevations the building is surrounded by raised terrace separated from the exterior walls by an areaway. The principal exterior building materials consist of marble on the east, south, and west facades; limestone within the two courtyards; and stucco on the north facades of the east and west wings.

The primary facade is faced in white Georgia marble and features a thirteen bay, engaged double-height colonnade of fluted Doric pilasters flanked by shallow projecting corner pavilions. A large entablature composed of a plain frieze and enriched ornamental cavetto cornice surmounts these pilasters. A single-height entrance pavilion composed of three pedimented formal entryways is centered on the facade.

Notable interior spaces include an elaborate marble entrance lobby, marble stair and elevator lobbies, and an ornamental auditorium space, all of which feature decorative painted finishes on ornamental plaster and compo features. An elaborate wood panelled primary executive office suite is located on the second floor.

Prior to the renovations, the building had 126,388 square feet of gross building area, and was on a 3.18-acre site.

== See also ==
- National Register of Historic Places listings in central Washington, D.C.
