= Pamela Chelgren-Koterba =

American military officer

- Born: Pamela Chelgren; 1950 (age 75–76); Annapolis, Maryland, United States
- Education: University of California Berkeley
- Military career
- Allegiance: United States
- Service: NOAA Corps
- Service years: 1972–1995
- Rank: Commander

Pamela Chelgren-Koterba (née Chelgren; born 1950) is a former officer of the United States' National Oceanic and Atmospheric Administration (NOAA) Commissioned Officer Corps. The daughter of a career naval officer, she was the first woman to receive a commission in the history of the NOAA Corps and, in 1977, was appointed to what was then the highest shipboard posting ever held by a woman in the Uniformed Services of the United States.

== Early life and education ==
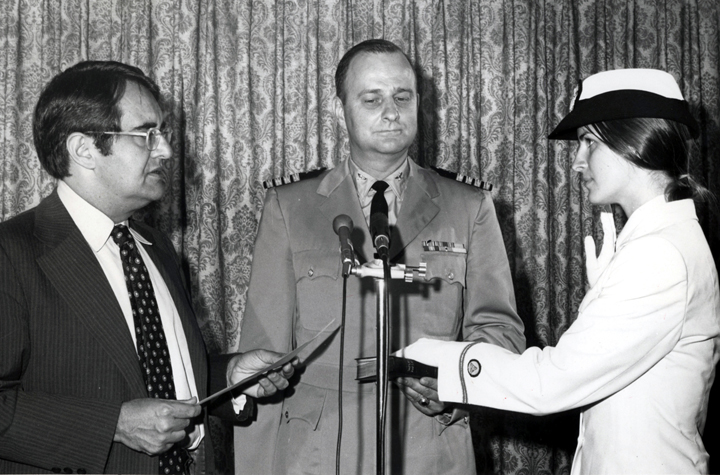
United States Secretary of Commerce Peter George Peterson administers the commissioning oath to Pamela Chelgren. Her father, Captain John Chelgren, is holding the Bible.

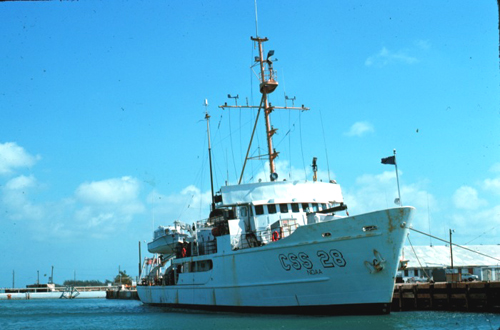
In 1977, Chelgren was made third in command of NOAAS Peirce.

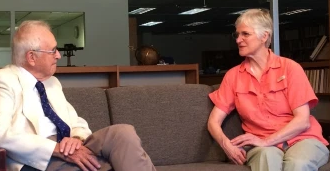
Pamela Chelgren-Koterba (right) is pictured with Rear Admiral Harley Nygren in 2018.

Pamela Chelgren-Koterba was born in 1950 in Annapolis, Maryland, and raised at various locations in the United States. She was the third of seven children of Captain John Chelgren, a career U.S. Navy officer who served as the technical director of the anti-air warfare ship acquisition project (1969–1972), and Ruth Henderson, an opera singer.

As a child she learned piano and flute and excelled at mathematics; while attending high school in 1967 in Bremerton, Washington, she was selected to attend the competitive summer mathematics institute at Western Washington State College. She finished her high school studies in Point Mugu, California, and enrolled as an undergraduate at the University of California at Berkeley, where she studied bioengineering and received a Bachelor's of Science in 1972. At Berkeley, she worked at the Space Sciences Laboratory, where she was responsible for checking data tapes for the OGO 5 satellite.

== Career ==
In 1972, Chelgren joined the NOAA Corps and completed the NOAA Basic Officer Training Course in Kings Point, New York, thereafter being commissioned an ensign, the first woman to receive an officer commission in the service's history. At the time of joining the NOAA Corps, she was unaware there were no women members. In an interview, she stated that – while she agreed with the elimination of discrimination against women in the workplace – she did not belong to any women's liberation organizations and felt that "some of the real radicals seem to hate men, and I don't go along with that".

In October 1977, Chelgren – then a lieutenant – was made operations officer aboard the 162-foot (49 m) hydrographic survey ship NOAAS Peirce, what was then the highest shipboard posting ever held by a woman in any of the Uniformed Services of the United States.

In May 1995 Chelgren-Koterba retired at the rank of commander. She later went to work as a Crisis Readiness Manager for Alyeska Pipeline Service Company (1996-2006), thence a planner and on-call responder for Witt O'Brien's (an oil spill management company), and a planner and on-call Incident Commander for the Washington State Maritime Cooperative, a hybrid public-private organization coordinating oil spill response in Washington state.

Rear Admiral Nancy Hann discussing Chelgren in 2023.

== Personal life ==
Chelgren-Koterba is a recreational skier and boater.

== Publications ==
- Lillywhite, Harvey; Licht, Paul; Chelgren, Pamela (1973). "The Role of Behavioral Thermoregulation in the Growth Energetics of the Toad, Bufo Boreas". Ecology. 54 (2): 375–383. doi:10.2307/1934345. JSTOR 1934345.
- Hankins, Paul; Knutsen, Gregg; Chelgren-Koterba, Pamela (March 2001). "Alyeska Pipeline Service Company's Response Training Program". International Oil Spill Conference Proceedings. 2001: 65–71. doi:10.7901/2169-3358-2001-1-65.
- Chelgren-Koterba, Pamela; Iwamoto, Larry; Hutton, Charlene; Lautenberger, Carl (March 2001). "Alaska Incident Management System (AIMS) Guide For Oil and Hazardous Substance Response". International Oil Spill Conference Proceedings. 2001 (2): 1059–1006. doi:10.7901/2169-3358-2001-2-1059.

== See also ==
- Vivien Crea – first woman to attain flag rank in the U.S. Coast Guard
- Alene Duerk – first woman to attain flag rank in the U.S. Navy
- Evelyn J. Fields – first woman to attain flag rank in the U.S. NOAA Corps
