= Northeast Middle School =

Northeast Middle School can refer to one of the following schools:

- Northeast Middle School (Jackson, TN), a public school in Jackson, Tennessee
- Northeast Middle School (Midland, MI), a public school in Midland, Michigan
- Northeast Middle School (Reading, Pennsylvania), a public school in Reading, Pennsylvania
- Northeast Middle School (Bethlehem, Pennsylvania), a public school in Bethlehem, Pennsylvania
- Northeast Middle School (Bristol, Connecticut)
- Northeast Middle School (Minneapolis, Minnesota)
- Northeast Middle School (Clarksville, TN), a public school in Clarksville, Tennessee

"Northeast" is also found in the name of other schools:

- Northeast College, a community college based in Houston, Texas
- Northeast Elementary School, public school in Kansas City, Missouri
- Northeast High School (disambiguation), a list of multiple high schools with the same name
