= De Bow =

De Bow may refer to:

== People ==
- J. D. B. De Bow (1820–1867), American publisher and statistician
- Samuel P. De Bow Jr., American admiral, director of the NOAA Commissioned Officer Corps 2003–2007

== Other ==
- De Bow's Review, American magazine of 1846–1884
