= NOAAS McArthur =

NOAA survey ship

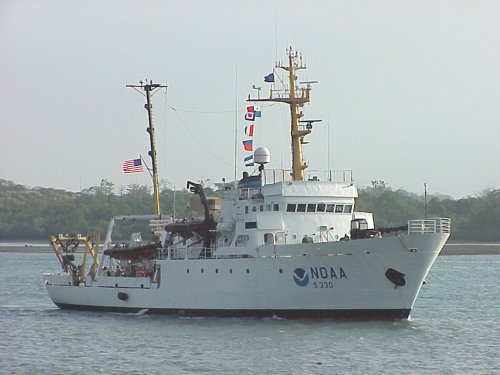
- NOAAS McArthur (S 330) sometime between 1970 and 2003

History

U.S. Coast & Geodetic Survey
- Name: USC&GS McArthur (CSS 30)
- Namesake: William Pope McArthur (1814–1850), a United States Coast Survey officer who pioneered hydrographic survey work on the United States West Coast
- Builder: Norfolk Shipbuilding and Drydock Company, Norfolk, Virginia
- Laid down: 15 July 1965
- Launched: 15 November 1965
- Sponsored by: Mrs. Jack K. Bennett
- Commissioned: 15 December 1966
- Fate: Transferred to National Oceanic and Atmospheric Administration 3 October 1970

NOAA
- Name: NOAAS McArthur (S 330)
- Namesake: Previous name retained
- Acquired: Transferred from U.S. Coast and Geodetic Survey 3 October 1970
- Decommissioned: 20 May 2003
- Home port: Seattle, Washington
- Nickname(s): "Mini-Mac" (after commissioning of the larger NOAAS McArthur II (R 330), known as "Big Mac," in May 2003)
- Fate: Sold to Blackwater Worldwide 2006
- Name: M/V McArthur
- Namesake: Previous name retained
- Owner: Academi
- Operator: Academi
- Port of registry: United States
- Acquired: 2006
- In service: September 2007
- Home port: Norfolk, Virginia
- Identification: IMO number: 6602082
- Status: Active

General characteristics (survey ship)
- Class & type: McArthur-class hydrographic survey ship S1-MT-70a
- Tonnage: 854 gross register tons; 207 net register tons
- Displacement: 995 tons (full load)
- Length: 175 ft (53 m)
- Beam: 38 ft (12 m)
- Draft: 12.1 ft (3.7 m)
- Installed power: 1,600 horsepower (2.1 megawatts)
- Propulsion: Two General Motors diesel engines, twin controllable-pitch propellers, 186 tons fuel
- Speed: 12 knots
- Range: 6,000 nautical miles at 12 knots
- Endurance: 17 days
- Complement: Either 23 (6 officers and 17 crew) plus up to 13 scientists or 38 (8 NOAA Corps officers, 3 licensed engineers, and 27 other crew), plus up to 2 scientists
- Notes: 440 kilowatts electrical power; Hydroplot PDP 11/34 computer

General characteristics (maritime security ship)
- Class & type: none
- Type: Private maritime security ship and training ship
- Tonnage: 854 gross register tons; 207 net register tons
- Displacement: 995 tons (full load)
- Length: 175 ft (53 m)
- Beam: 38 ft (12 m)
- Draft: 12.1 ft (3.7 m)
- Installed power: 1,600 horsepower (2.1 megawatts)
- Propulsion: Two General Motors diesel engines, twin controllable-pitch propellers, 186 tons fuel
- Speed: 12 knots
- Range: 6,000 nautical miles at 12 knots
- Endurance: 17 days
- Boats & landing craft carried: Three rigid-hulled inflatable boats (RHIBs)
- Complement: 45 (includes 35 private security personnel)
- Aircraft carried: Two MH-6 Little Bird helicopters

NOAAS McArthur (S 330), was an American survey ship in commission in the National Oceanic and Atmospheric Administration (NOAA) from 1970 to 2003. Prior to her NOAA career she was in commission in the United States Coast and Geodetic Survey from 1966 to 1970 as USC&GS McArthur (CSS-30).

In 2007, the ship went into private service with Blackwater Worldwide (later known as Blackwater USA, Xe Services LLC, and Academi) as the maritime security and training ship M/V McArthur

== Construction and commissioning ==
Constructed as a "coastal survey ship" (CSS) for the U.S. Coast and Geodetic Survey, McArthur was laid down on 15 July 1965 by the Norfolk Shipbuilding and Drydock Company at Norfolk, Virginia, and launched on 15 November 1965, sponsored by Mrs. Jack K. Bennett. The Coast and Geodetic Survey commissioned her on 15 December 1966 as USC&GS McArthur (CSS 30). When the Coast and Geodetic Survey merged with other United States Government agencies to form NOAA on 3 October 1970, McArthur became part of the NOAA fleet as NOAAS McArthur (S 330).

McArthur had one sister ship, NOAAS Davidson (S 331).

== Service history as USC&GS and NOAAS McArthur ==
With her home port at Seattle, Washington, McArthur spent her career operating along the United States West Coast, in Alaskan waters, and in the eastern Pacific Ocean. She began her career operating as a hydrographic survey ship, but later became primary U.S. West Coast current survey vessel. She engaged in measurements of chemical, meteorological, and biological sampling for several large-scale programs within NOAA. Her work was focused primarily on the exclusive economic zone of the United States off the U.S. West Coast, especially in several of the National Marine Sanctuaries there. She also conducted Chase Encirclement Stress Studies (CHESS) -- marine mammal surveys throughout the eastern tropical Pacific—and took part in the Oregon, California, Washington (ORCAWALE) Project in support of protected species research efforts; she also participated in the Sustainable Seas Expedition. The scientists who carried out research aboard McArthur came from many divisions of NOAA, as well as other United States Government agencies, U.S. state government agencies, and academia.

On 26 October 1969, McArthur was docked in Ketchikan, Alaska, when a gunman shot a member of her crew, wiper John Fleagle, in the back on the pier. Fleagle managed to get aboard the ship and entered the stateroom of ESSA Corps Lieutenant, junior grade, Robert C. Husted, Jr., at approximately 06:00 hours. Husted attended to Fleagle's immediate medical needs and, after determining that the gunman was aboard McArthur and holding the ship's captain and quartermaster at gunpoint, left the ship at considerable risk to his life to run barefoot to the United States Coast Guard base about one-half mile (0.8 km) away to summon an ambulance and police. For his actions, Hustedt received the Department of Commerce Silver Medal in 1970.

In 1989, the McArthur became the first NOAA ship to be commanded by a woman, Evelyn Fields. Fields thus also became the first woman to command a ship for an extended assignment in any United States uniformed service.

McArthur was decommissioned on 20 May 2003 at the NOAA Marine Operations Center at Seattle and replaced in the NOAA fleet by the oceanographic research ship NOAAS McArthur II (R 330), which was commissioned the same day in a combined ceremony.

== M/V McArthur ==
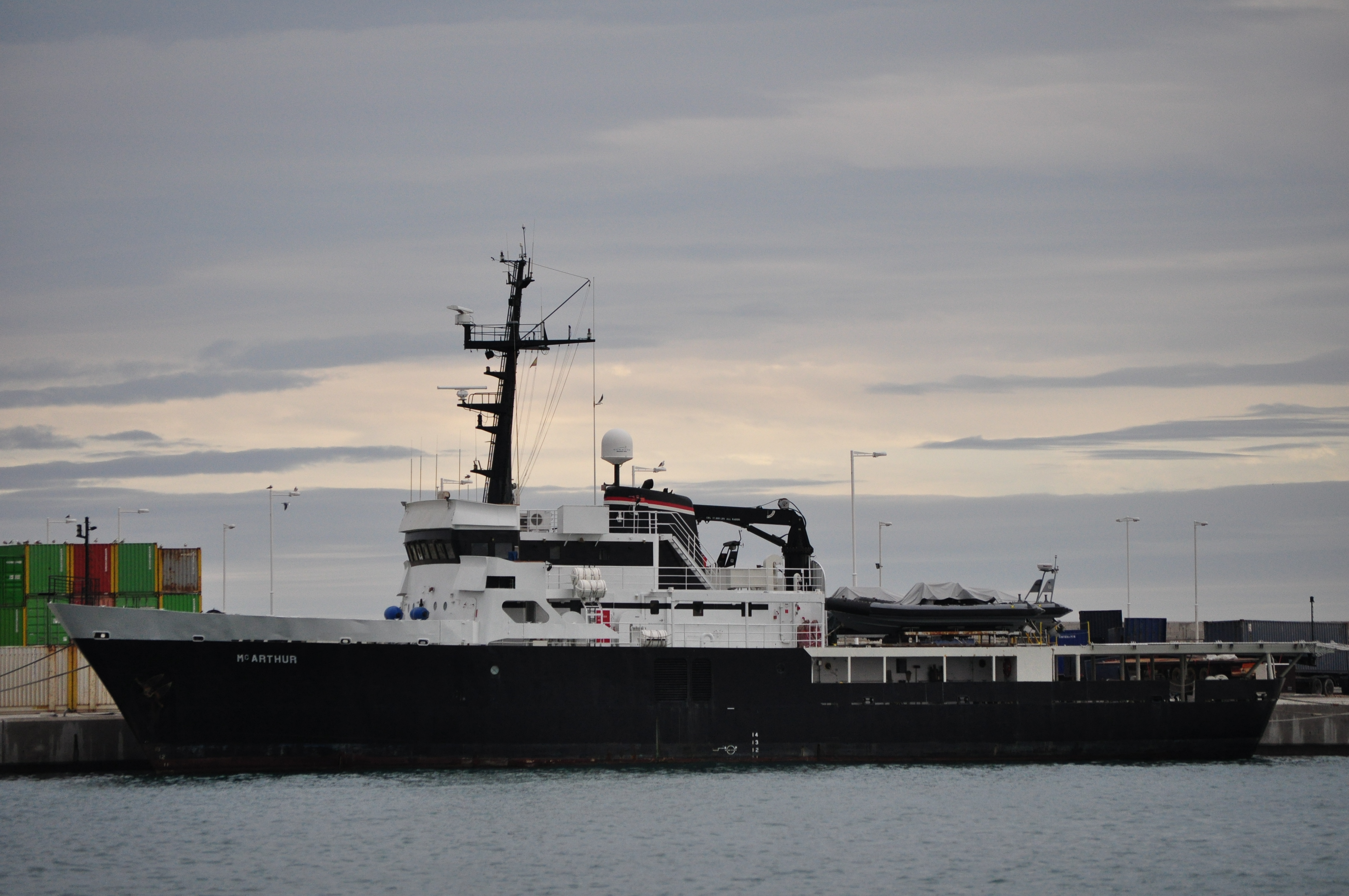
MV McArthur in 2010

In 2006, McArthur was sold to Blackwater Worldwide, which converted her for use as a training ship and private maritime security ship, fitting her to carry two MH-6 Little Bird helicopters, three rigid-hulled inflatable boats (RHIBs), and a crew of 45 that includes 35 private security personnel. She entered service with the company in September 2007 as M/V McArthur, home-ported at Norfolk, Virginia, and repainted with a blue hull and white upper works.

Blackwater Worldwide described McArthur as a multipurpose maritime vessel designed to support military and law enforcement training, peacekeeping, and stability operations around the world. In October 2008, it offered McArthur's services to shipping companies, seeking contracts to escort merchant ships in waters off Somalia to provide protection against attacks by Somali pirates. However, McArthur was far too slow to keep up with the ships she was expected to protect.

The whistleblower organization WikiLeaks published diplomatic cables that related to McArthur. The cables show that diplomats in the region where Blackwater/Xe/Academi proposed to operate McArthur to escort merchant ships requested guidance over the extent to which they should support Blackwater's attempts to secure customers for McArthur. Mark Mazzetti of the New York Times noted

But with the Obama administration just weeks old, American diplomats in Djibouti faced a problem. They are supposed to be advocates for American businesses, but this was Blackwater, a company that Secretary of State Hillary Clinton had proposed banning from war zones when she was a presidential candidate.

According to Wired magazine, civil suits from McArthur's civilian crew members caused cancellation of plans to employ her on military missions; three civilian crew members filed harassment suits. The fully equipped vessel sat moored in Norfolk, awaiting contracts.

By 2010 the company, renamed Xe Services LLC in 2009 and Academi in 2011, was offering McArthur for sale. After Blackwater converted her in 2007, McArthur was said to be worth $15 million (USD), but by 2010 Xe was willing to sell her for $3.7 million.
