= David Titley =

American oceanographer

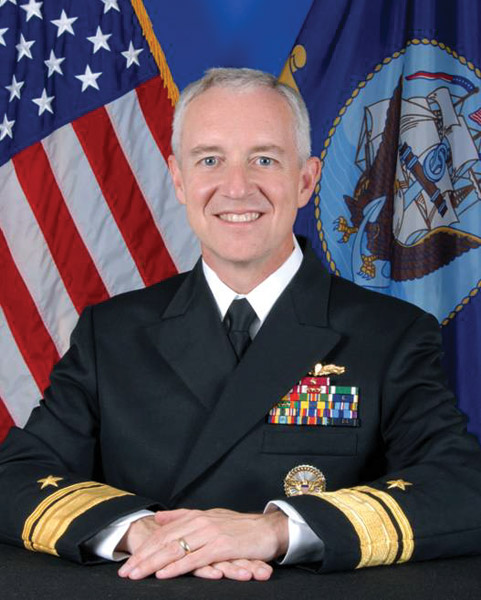
- Titley in 2009
- Born: 1958 (age 67–68); Schenectady, New York
- Military career
- Allegiance: United States
- Branch: United States Navy; NOAA Commissioned Officer Corps
- Scientific career
- Education: Penn State, Naval Postgraduate School
- Awards: Fellow of the American Meteorological Society since 2009
- Fields: Meteorology, oceanography
- Workplaces: U.S. Navy, NOAA Corps, Penn State
- Thesis: Intensification and structure change of super Typhoon Flo as related to the large-scale environment (1998)

David William Titley (born 1958) is a professor of meteorology at Pennsylvania State University and the founding director of their Center for Solutions to Weather and Climate Risk. He was also NOAA's chief operating officer from 2012 to 2013. Before assuming these positions, he was a rear admiral in, and the chief oceanographer of, the U.S. Navy, in which he served for 32 years. He is a fellow of the American Meteorological Society.

== Life ==
Titley graduated from Pennsylvania State University with a B.S. degree in meteorology. He later attended the Naval Postgraduate School, earning an M.S. degree in meteorology and physical oceanography in 1989 and a Ph.D. degree in meteorology in 1998.

Titley initiated the Navy's Task Force on Climate Change, and serves on the CNA Corporation's Military Advisory Board. He was formerly agnostic about climate change, but later changed his mind after looking at the evidence of what factors influence climate–which are, according to Titley, "what are the larger things doing – what is the ocean doing? What is the sun doing? And what's our atmosphere doing?" Since then, he has described climate change as "one of the driving forces in the 21st century" and said that it contributed to the 2011 Arab Spring.

The Department of Defense requested that Titley present on their behalf at both Congressional Hearings and the Intergovernmental Panel on Climate Change (IPCC) meetings from 2009 to 2011. From 2012-2013 he served as the Deputy Under Secretary for Operations, NOAA.

Titley is a member of the Hoover Institution's Arctic Security Initiative, and serves on the Advisory Boards of the Applied Research Laboratory at Penn State, the Center for Climate and Security, Columbia University's Center for Research on Environmental Decisions, and the Association of Climate Change Officers. He is a member of the National Academies of Science committee on Geoengineering and the Center for Naval Analysis' Military Advisory Board and co-chairs the National Research Council's "A Decadal Survey of Ocean Sciences" committee. Titley sits on the Science and Security Board at the Bulletin of the Atomic Scientists, which among other things, enables him to participate in the discussions that determine the position of the Bulletin's famed Doomsday Clock. Titley is also on the Advisory Board of the Citizens' Climate Lobby.

== Awards ==
In 2023 he received the Friends of the Planet award from the National Center for Science Education (NCSE).
