= Admiral Field =

Admiral Field may refer to:

- Arthur Mostyn Field (1855–1950), British Royal Navy admiral
- Edward Field (Royal Navy officer) (1828–1912), British Royal Navy admiral
- Frederick Field (Royal Navy officer) (1871–1945), British Royal Navy admiral

== See also ==
- Evelyn J. Fields (born 1949), National Oceanic and Atmospheric Administration Commissioned Officer Corps rear admiral
