= Northeast High School =

Northeast High School may refer to:

- North Little Rock Northeast High School, North Little Rock, Arkansas (1970-1990)
- Northeast High School (Oakland Park, Florida)
- Northeast High School (St. Petersburg, Florida)
- Northeast High School (Georgia), Macon, Georgia
- Northeast High School (Louisiana), East Baton Rougle Parish, Louisiana
- Northeast High School (Pasadena, Maryland)
- Northeast Metro Regional Vocational School, Wakefield, Massachusetts
- Northeast High School (Missouri), Kansas City
- Northeast High School (Philadelphia, Pennsylvania)
- Northeast Catholic High School, Philadelphia, Pennsylvania

== See also ==
- North East High School (disambiguation)
- Northeastern High School (disambiguation)
