= Samuel P. De Bow Jr. =

Former NOAA Corps Director

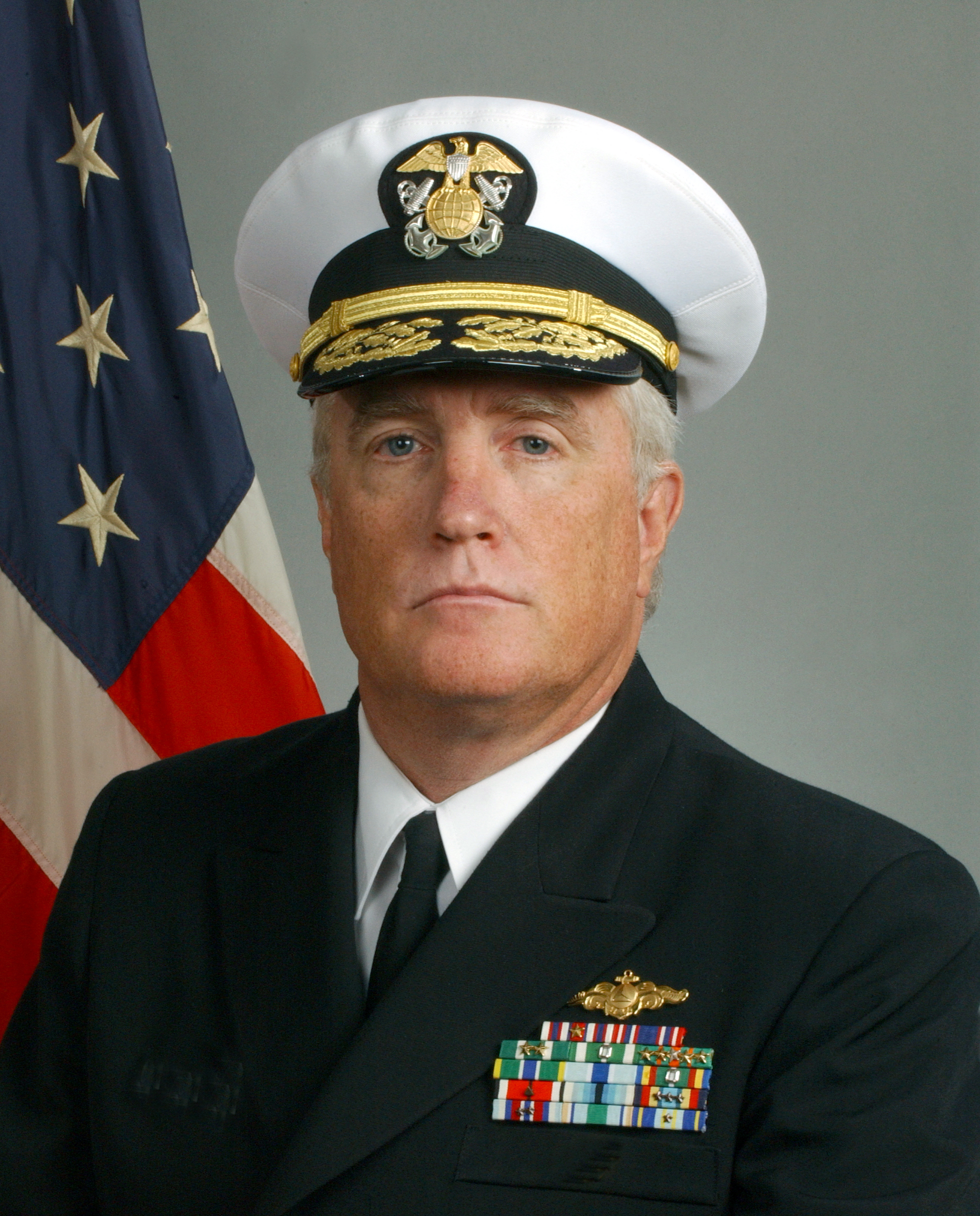
- Undated photo from the 3 August 2004 edition of NOAA Magazine
- Born: Philadelphia, Pennsylvania
- Education: Drexel University (BS); Naval Postgraduate School (MS)
- Military career
- Allegiance: United States
- Branch: NOAA Commissioned Officer Corps
- Service years: 1976–2007
- Rank: Rear Admiral
- Commands: NOAAS Rude; NOAA Office of Marine and Aviation Operations; NOAA Commissioned Officer Corps
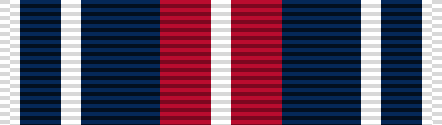
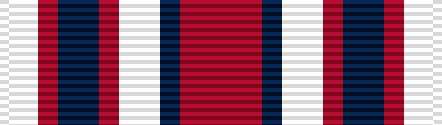
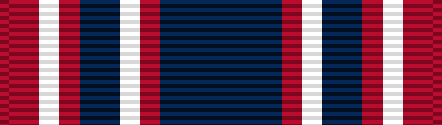
- Awards: Department of Commerce Gold Medal Department of Commerce Silver Medal Department of Commerce Bronze Medal

Samuel P. Debow Jr., is a retired rear admiral of the National Oceanic and Atmospheric Administration (NOAA) Commissioned Officer Corps who served as Director, NOAA Commissioned Officer Corps, and director, NOAA Office of Marine and Aviation Operations from 2003 to 2007.

== Early life and education ==
De Bow was born and raised in Philadelphia, Pennsylvania, where he graduated from Northeast Catholic High School. He received a bachelor of science in commerce and engineering from Drexel University and later a master's degree in hydrographic sciences from the Naval Postgraduate School.

== Career ==
=== NOAA Commissioned Officer Corps ===
De Bow was commissioned as an officer in the NOAA Commissioned Officer Corps in 1976. During his NOAA Corps career, he focused on hydrography, conducting hydrographic surveys in waters throughout the United States as well as in Norway, where he served a tour as an exchange hydrographer.

De Bow served three tours aboard NOAA fleet hydrographic survey ships and two in NOAA mobile hydrographic field units. His third and final sea tour was as commanding officer of the survey ship NOAAS Rude. Under his command, Rude found the wreckage of TWA Flight 800 on the bottom of the Atlantic Ocean south of Long Island, New York, in 1996 after the airliner's disastrous crash that July.

Ashore, De Bow served in a variety of staff, management, and technical positions, most of them involved in supporting NOAA's mapping and nautical charting work. He served a tour as chief of NOAA's Hydrographic Services Division, leading NOAA's national hydrographic survey program. During the search for John F. Kennedy Jr.’s aircraft after it crashed in July 1999, he served as NOAA's on-scene operations officer, and Rude found the aircraft's wreckage on the bottom of the Atlantic Ocean off Martha's Vineyard, Massachusetts. After EgyptAir Flight 990 crashed into the Atlantic Ocean south of Nantucket, Massachusetts, on 31 October 1999, he coordinated NOAA's search efforts, and the NOAA survey ship NOAAS Whiting found the airliner's wreckage in early November. He also was a senior executive fellow at Harvard University’s John F. Kennedy School of Government and attended the "Leadership for a Democratic Society" curriculum at the Federal Executive Institute.

President George W. Bush nominated De Bow to be Director, NOAA Commissioned Officer Corps and director, Office of Marine and Aviation Operations, and the United States Senate confirmed the nomination in 2003. De Bow served as director of the two organizations until 2007. In 2006, Bush appointed him to NOAA's seat as a commissioner on the Mississippi River Commission.

During De Bow's directorship, NOAA became the United States Government leader in the use of the Global Positioning System (GPS), high-resolution side-scan sonar, and shallow-water multibeam echosounder systems to survey the sea floor. He retired from NOAA on 1 October 2007.

=== Later career ===
In 2008, De Bow became the director of the Center of Excellence for Research on Offshore Renewable energy at the University of Rhode Island's Graduate School of Oceanography. While there, he served as the co-principal investigator for a comprehensive US$10 million marine spatial planning effort – the Ocean Special Area Management Plan, or Ocean SAMP – funded by the State of Rhode Island to select sites for offshore renewable energy infrastrtucture in Rhode Island's waters. He also managed the National Science Foundation oceanographic research ship Endeavor until leaving the directorship in August 2011.

In 2011, De Bow joined Dawson & Associates. In 2015, he became a member of the Marine Board, a part of the Transportation Research Board of the National Academies of Sciences, Engineering, and Medicine.

In 2020, De Bow moved from Dawson & Associates to Lynker Technologies, where he became a vice president serving as the enterprise product manager directly supporting NOAA's Office of Coast Survey.

== Personal life ==
De Bow and his wife Susan have a son and two daughters. As of October 2006, the family resided in Olney, Maryland.

== Honors and awards ==
=== NOAA ===
De Bow's more notable awards include:

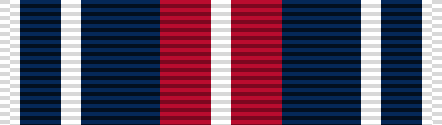
Department of Commerce Gold Medal
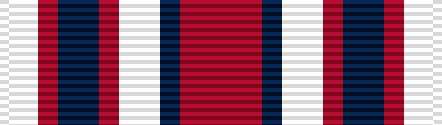
Department of Commerce Silver Medal (two awards)
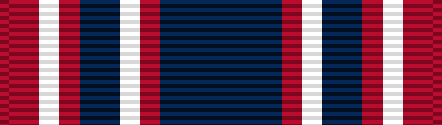
Department of Commerce Bronze Medal
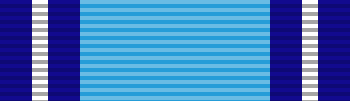
NOAA Administrator's Award
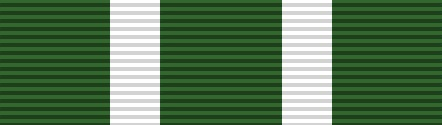
NOAA Corps Commendation Medal (three awards)
Coast Guard Commendation Medal with "O" device
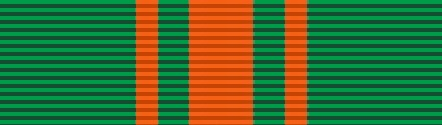
NOAA Corps Achievement Medal (nine awards)
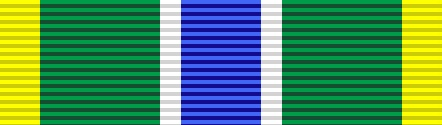
NOAA Corps Director's Ribbon
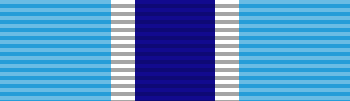
NOAA Unit Citation Award
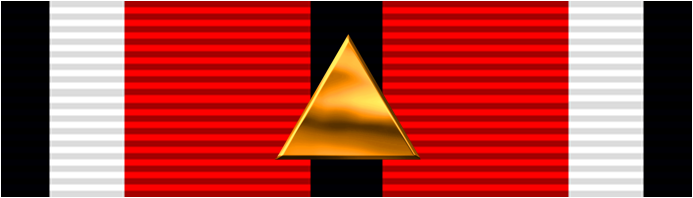
Society of American Military Engineers Karo Award with bronze Triangle Device

De Bow was part of a group that received the Department of Commerce Gold Medal for its work in locating the wreckage of TWA Flight 800.

=== Other ===
In 2013, De Bow was inducted into the Drexel 100, a hall of fame for prestigious Drexel University alumni.

== Professional associations ==
From 2013 to 2017, De Bow was a board member of the Military Officers Association of America.

Military offices
Preceded by Evelyn J. Fields	Director of the National Oceanic and Atmospheric Administration Commissioned Corps; 2003–2007	Succeeded by Jonathan W. Bailey
