= Deputy Under Secretary for Operations, NOAA =

Deputy Under Secretary for Operations of NOAA
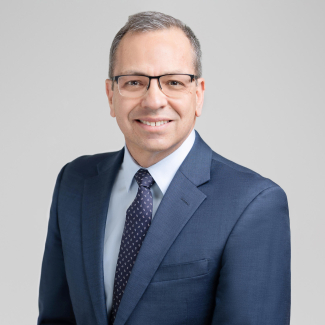
- Incumbent; Del Brockett since 18 August 2026
- Office of the Under Secretary of Commerce for Oceans and Atmosphere
- Abbreviation: DUSO
- Reports to: Under Secretary of Commerce for Oceans and Atmosphere and NOAA Administrator
- Appointer: NOAA Administrator
- Formation: 19 August 1949; 77 years ago
- First holder: Rear Admiral David Titley
- Website: www.noaa.gov/about-our-agency/leadership-and-senior-advisors

The office of Deputy Under Secretary for Operations (DUSO) of the National Oceanic and Atmospheric Administration has been in existence since 2012, but became an important role at NOAA with the appointment of Vice Admiral Michael S. Devany in 2014, the first NOAA Corps officer to hold that rank since Henry A. Karo in 1942. The DUSO would also be the daily director of operations in charge of the National Marine Fisheries Service, National Ocean Service, National Environmental Satellite, Data and Information Service, Oceanic and Atmospheric Research, National Weather Service, Office of Marine and Aviation Operations, and the NOAA Commissioned Officer Corps.

In 2020, NOAA issued administrative order NAO 200-3B that outlines the position of DUSO.

== Deputy Under Secretary of Operations, NOAA ==
No.	Portrait	Name	Took Office	Left Office	Ref.
1		Rear Admiral; David Titley	June 2012	January 2013	
2		David M. Kennedy	January 2013	December 2013	
3		Vice Admiral; Michael S. Devany	January 2014	April 2016	
4		Benjamin Friedman	April 2016	June 2024	
5		Vice Admiral; Nancy A. Hann	July 2024	December 2025	
Acting		Del Brockett	December 2025	August 2026	
6		Del Brockett	August 2026	Present	
