= William L. Stubblefield =

Former NOAA Corps Director

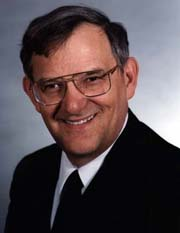
- Rear Admiral William L. Stubblefield, NOAA
- Born: 1940 (age 85–86)
- Allegiance: United States
- Branch: United States Navy; National Oceanic and Atmospheric Administration Commissioned Corps
- Service years: 1962 – 1968 (US Navy); 1971 – 1999 (NOAA Corps)
- Rank: Rear Admiral
- Commands: NOAAS Surveyor; Director, NOAA Commissioned Officer Corps
- Awards: Department of Commerce Silver Medal

William L. Stubblefield (born 1940), is a retired NOAA Commissioned Corps rear admiral. He served as the director of the NOAA Commissioned Corps from 1995 to 1999.

== Early life and naval career ==
A native of Medina, Tennessee, Stubblefield received his bachelor's degree from the Memphis State University. In 1962, he was commissioned an Ensign in the United States Navy after he completed Naval Officer Candidate School. A surface warfare officer, he served on the minesweeper USS Frigate Bird (AMS-191) and the icebreaker USCGC Burton Island (WAGB-283) at sea, and ashore at submarine tracking facilities (SOSUS) in Bermuda and in Grand Turk. Stubblefield left the Navy in 1968 to enroll at the University of Iowa, where he received an M.S. in geology in 1971.

== NOAA career ==
In 1971, Stubblefield joined the NOAA Commissioned corps as a Lieutenant upon the completion of NOAA Corps Basic Officer Training. His first assignments were at sea on NOAAS Pathfinder and Rainier. He next served ashore as the Deputy Director of the Marine Geology and Geophysics Division at the Atlantic Oceanographic and Meteorological Laboratory (AOML), Office of Oceanic and Atmospheric Research in Miami. For his work while serving in Miami, Stubblefield was awarded the NOAA Corps Achievement Medal.

Stubblefield subsequently returned to sea as the operations officer on board NOAAS Researcher. From 1978 to 1979, he attended Texas A&M University, earning a Ph.D. in geological oceanography. His field of research was coastal processes along the Atlantic coast. His research resulted in over 30 peer reviewed professional papers in the field of marine geology. On several occasions, Stubblefield dove in the Deep Submersible ALVIN to advance his studies. After a stint back at AOML, Stubblefield returned to Researcher as Executive Officer.

Following his assignments at sea Stubblefield served in a number of administrative and scientific positions with NOAA. He returned to sea in 1988 as the commanding officer of NOAAS Surveyor. Under his command Surveyor conducted research from the arctic to the Antarctic. At the time Surveyor gained the distinction of having traveled the farthest north and farthest south of any NOAA vessel to date. The Surveyor was in the vicinity of Point Barrow, Alaska when the three whales were caught in the ice.

In 1990, Stubblefield was named as coordinator for the Fleet Modernization Study, a project to assess the life of the existing fleet and to predict the way forward for future NOAA ships. For his work on this study he was awarded the Department of Commerce Silver Medal, the second highest award for NOAA Corps Officers. Later in 1990, Stubblefield became the Executive Director, Office of Oceanic and Atmospheric Research. In 1992, he was promoted to Rear Admiral Lower Half and made the Deputy Director, Office of NOAA Corps Operations.

On 22 May 1995, Stubblefield assumed the position of director of the Office of NOAA Corps Operations, the top commissioned officer in the NOAA Commissioned Corps and as Rear Admiral Upper Half. He served in this position until 2 March 1999.

== Later life ==
After leaving the NOAA Commissioned Corps, Stubblefield and his wife Dr. Bonnie McGregor Stubblefield, retired to Berkeley County, West Virginia in 1999. He was active in local politics serving on the Berkeley County Public Service Water District and subsequently as the president of the Berkeley County Council. He left office in 2012 with no intention of running for another elected office in the future, but does plan on remaining active in the community. Dr. Stubblefield currently serves on the Board of Directors for Blue Ridge Community and Technical College, Berkeley County Fire Board, Hospice of the Panhandle of West Virginia, Strategic Planning for Berkeley Health, Elder and President of Trustees for First Presbyterian Church in Berkeley County. Dr. Stubblefield has served on the national Board of Directors of the Military Officers Association of America and the Advisory Board for the Sea Grant College and University Program (Sea Grant).

Military offices
| Preceded by Sigmund R. Petersen | Director, NOAA Commissioned Officer Corps; 1995–1999 | Succeeded by Evelyn J. Fields |
