= Music of the NOAA Corps =

The music of the NOAA Corps of the United States principally consists of two songs, "Forward with NOAA" and "Into the Oceans and the Air".

== "Forward with NOAA" ==
"Forward with NOAA" was adopted as the service march of the NOAA Corps in 1988.

"Forward with NOAA" was composed by Harold W. "Bud" Arberg, the arranger of "The Army Goes Rolling Along", in 1988 at the request of his son Bob Arberg, who had been prompted by the National Association of Commissioned Officers to help devise a song for the agency. It was subsequently adopted by the NOAA Corps as its official marching song.

== "Into the Oceans and the Air" ==
A vocal rendition of the chorus of "Into the Oceans and the Air"

"Into the Oceans and the Air", a sea chanty, was adopted as the new service song of the NOAA Corps in 2017. It was composed by Sean Nelson, staff arranger of the United States Coast Guard Band, in recognition of which he was decorated with the NOAA Corps Commendation Medal. The song was first performed on June 18, 2017 in a concert given by the Coast Guard Band.

== See also ==
- "Anchors Aweigh"
- "Semper Paratus"
