= Nancy Hann =

Vice admiral in the NOAA Commissioned Officer Corps

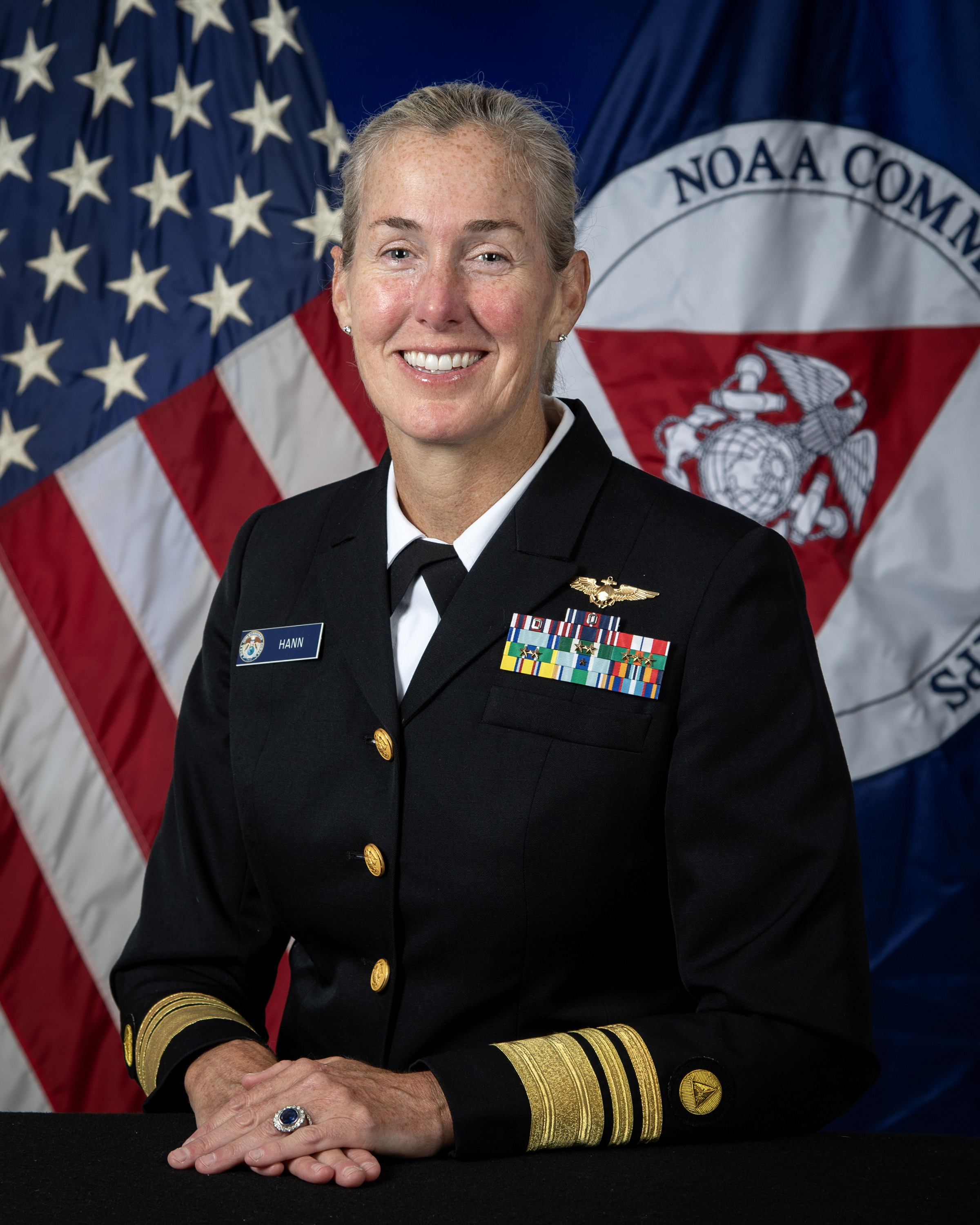
- Official portrait, 2024

Under Secretary of Commerce for Oceans and Atmosphere (Note: Ex-officio acting administrator of NOAA)
- Acting
- In office January 20, 2025 – March 31, 2025
- President: Donald Trump
- Preceding: Michael C. Morgan
- Succeeded by: Neil Jacobs

Personal details
- Born: 1973 (age 52–53)
- Education: George Washington University (AS); University of San Diego (BA); Embry-Riddle Aeronautical University (MS); George Washington University (GrDip); Harvard University (MPA)
- Awards: Department of Commerce Silver Medal with O device Department of Commerce Bronze Medal

Military service
- Allegiance: United States
- Branch/service: NOAA Commissioned Officer Corps
- Years of service: 1999-2026
- Rank: Vice Admiral
- Commands: Deputy Under Secretary for Operations, NOAA; Director, NOAA Commissioned Officer Corps; Director, NOAA Office of Marine and Aviation Operations

Nancy A. Hann (born 1973) is a retired NOAA Commissioned Officer Corps vice admiral. Hann last served as the deputy under secretary for operations at the National Oceanic and Atmospheric Administration from June 2024 to December 2025. She also held the role of acting NOAA Administrator and Under Secretary of Commerce for Oceans and Atmosphere from January 20 to March 31, 2025. Prior to that, she served as the director of the NOAA Corps and director of the NOAA Office of Marine and Aviation Operations (OMAO) from November 2021 to July 2024, and was the NOAA Corps and OMAO's deputy director from April 2018 to November 2021. Hann is the first woman to achieve the rank of vice admiral in the history of the NOAA Corps and its predecessors.

== Early life ==
Nancy Hann grew up in Illinois, as a child she recalled one of her favorite things was to watch the thunderstorms. She's always been interested in Earth's weather and her mother claimed she had been interested in weather patterns since the beginning.

== Career ==
Hann started her career with NOAA as a fisheries observer in 1996 and she commissioned as an officer in the NOAA Corps in 1999. She served on commercial fishing vessels, NSF research vessels and various NOAA ships and aircraft, as a pilot, flight meteorologist, NOAA Diver and unmanned aircraft systems pilot. She is responsible for the direct leadership and management of OMAO's operational assets, including the agency's fleet of 16 research and survey vessels and nine aircraft.

Hann in 2023 discussing Pamela Chelgren, the first female officer in the NOAA Corps

Prior Assignments:

- Commanding officer of the NOAA Aircraft Operations Center
- Office of Marine and Aviation Operations Chief of Staff.
- Executive Officer at the NOAA Marine Operations Center-Atlantic
- Associate Director at the Atlantic Oceanographic and Meteorological Laboratory
- NOAA liaison to the U.S. Pacific Command.

In July 2021, RDML Hann was nominated for promotion to rear admiral (two-stars) and assignment as the new director of the NOAA Commissioned Officer Corps, succeeding retired Rear Admiral Michael J. Silah. She was confirmed on 16 November 2021.

In June 2024, RADM Hann was appointed for promotion to vice admiral and appointment as NOAA's deputy under secretary for operations. She assumed office and rank, effective 15 July 2024.

On January 20, 2025, Hann became Acting Under Secretary of Commerce for Oceans and Atmosphere as well as NOAA Administrator.

On April 1, 2025, Hann returned to her position as NOAA’s Deputy Under Secretary for Operations. In November 2025, Politico announced that she will retire from the NOAA Corps effective 1 March 2026 after over 27 years of service. Hann had been on terminal leave from 22 December 2025 up until her effective retirement date.

== Education ==
- A.S. in Project Management at George Washington University
- B.A. in Marine Science and Biology at the University of San Diego
- M.S. in Space Studies and Remote Sensing at Embry-Riddle Aeronautical University
- M.P.A at the Harvard University Kennedy School

== Awards ==
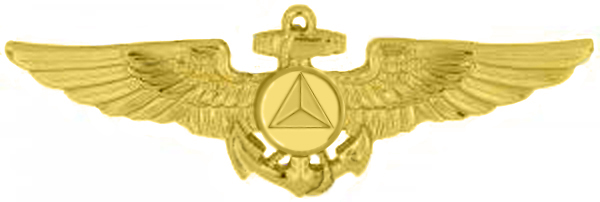
NOAA Aviator insignia

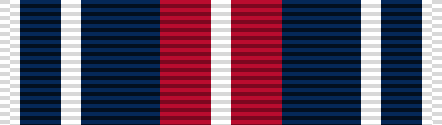
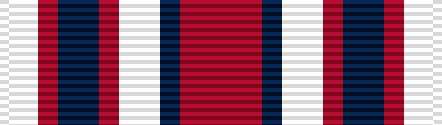
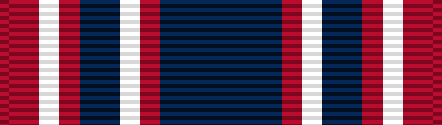
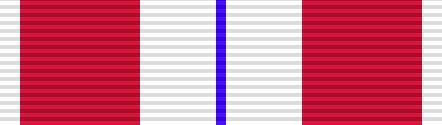
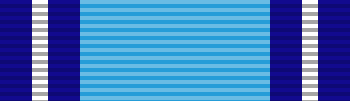
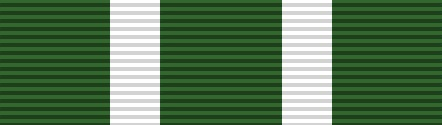
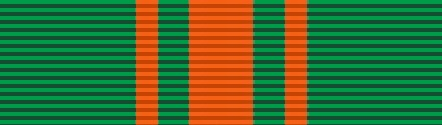
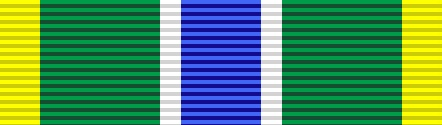
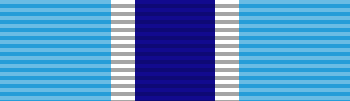
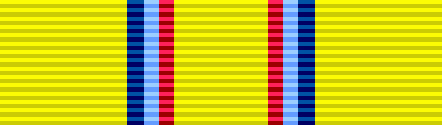
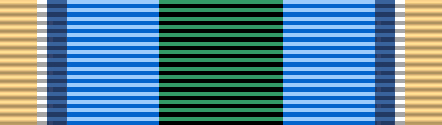
Department of Commerce Gold Medal with "O" device
Department of Commerce Silver Medal with "O" device
Department of Commerce Bronze Medal
NOAA Corps Meritorious Service Medal
NOAA Administrator's Award
NOAA Corps Commendation Medal with two 5/16 inch gold stars
NOAA Corps Achievement Medal with three 5/16" gold stars
NOAA Corps Director's Ribbon with two 5/16" gold stars
NOAA Unit Citation Award with 3/16" bronze star
NOAA Sea Service Deployment Ribbon
NOAA Corps Pacific Service Ribbon
NOAA Corps Mobile Duty Service Ribbon
NOAA National Response Service Ribbon

== Notes ==
Military offices
Preceded by Michael J. Silah	Director of the National Oceanic and Atmospheric Administration Commissioned Corps; 2021–2024	Succeeded by Chad M. Cary
