= Northeastern High School =

Northeastern High School may refer to:

- Northeastern High School (Michigan), Detroit, Michigan
- Northeastern High School (North Carolina), Elizabeth City, North Carolina
- Northeastern High School (Indiana), Fountain City, Indiana
- Northeastern High School (Ohio), Springfield, Ohio
- Northeastern High School (Pennsylvania), Manchester, Pennsylvania

== See also ==
- North East High School (disambiguation)
- Northeast High School (disambiguation)
