= Northeast Catholic High School =

The Northeast Catholic High School For Boys
- North Catholic

Location
- 1842 East Torresdale Avenue; Philadelphia, Pennsylvania 19124; United States; 40°0′20″N 75°5′42″W

Information
- Type: Private, All-Male
- Motto: Tenui Nec Dimittam (I have taken hold, and I will not let go)
- Religious affiliations: Roman Catholic; Oblates of Saint Francis de Sales
- Established: 1926
- Closed: 2010
- President: Fr. Vince Smith
- Principal: Fr. Nicholas Waseline
- Faculty: 45
- Grades: 9–12
- Campus: Urban
- Colors: Cardinal Red and White
- Athletics: NCCrew4Life
- Athletics conference: Philadelphia Catholic League
- Team name: Falcons
- Accreditation: Middle States Association of Colleges and Schools
- Newspaper: The Good News
- Yearbook: The Falcon
- Alumni: 40,000

Northeast Catholic High School opened in 1926 as Northeast Catholic High School for Boys, and was located at 1842 East Torresdale Avenue, Philadelphia, Pennsylvania. It was under the administration of the high school system of the Roman Catholic Archdiocese of Philadelphia and its sports teams participated in the Philadelphia Catholic League.

Northeast Catholic followed the Salesian tradition, which means that "North's" priests followed in the footsteps of Saint Francis de Sales in their day-to-day actions and mission statement. The school closed permanently in June 2010.

== History ==
Northeast Catholic High School for Boys opened on September 8, 1926, as the fourth Diocesan High School in Philadelphia. The site for the school was purchased from the Pennsylvania Railroad for $150,000. The new students were welcomed at the first assembly, held in the gym, by the Rev. Joseph Butler, OSFS, the Principal and Superior.

The school chose the Falcon as a symbol of the school for three reasons: It is "a bird of prey that never lets go of what it has captured; it is completely faithful to its trainer; and it is the fastest of God's creatures". The students also chose Cardinal Red and White as the school colors: Cardinal Red in appreciation of Dennis Cardinal Dougherty's sponsorship of the school and White for purity and fidelity. In 1928, the school newspaper, The Good News, was founded, followed by The Falcon, the North Catholic Yearbook in 1929.

June 12, 1929, marked the school's first commencement ceremony. Auxiliary Bishop Gerald O'Hara presented the diplomas to the 98 "Class of 1929" graduates. By the fall of 1935, North's enrollment had climbed to 2,300 students. The school was initially built to accommodate 1,500. The school opened a freshman annex at the Visitation Parish School in Kensington.

=== World War II ===
Shortly after the bombing of Pearl Harbor, the U.S. Government sought men with engineering and technical skills for the armed forces. A night school was established at North, and instructors from nearby colleges and universities conducted the classes. These courses continued until the end of World War Two.

The school year of 1942 opened with an enrollment of 3,159 students. On November 23, 1942, an Open House attracted over 5,000 people to visit the displays marking the achievements of North Catholic. By this time, over 1,200 alumni were serving in the armed forces. Among the graduates of 1942 who served in World War II was Joseph Francis Kuhn who would return to Philadelphia and launch a successful music composing career.

While many high schools canceled their Spring Sports programs due to the many students working part-time in the War industries, North fielded championship teams in baseball, track, and crew.

On September 4, 1945, 1,186 freshmen reported to North, and the total enrollment was 3,503. Since North was the only Catholic High School in the entire Northeast and suburbs, students traveled from neighborhoods like North Philadelphia, Germantown, Mount Airy, Logan, Olney, & Wayne Junction, Mayfair Tacony, and the entire Far Northeast. This was due to the school's access to Frankford Station, including trolleys, buses, and the "El" to many parts of town and beyond. Some students even took the rail lines and buses and came to North from suburban areas such as Bristol, Jenkintown, Willow Grove, Glenside, and Bensalem, Pennsylvania. After the 1950s and the building of several new Catholic High Schools, the traditional nearby Parishes in Neighborhoods such as Frankford, Fishtown, Port Richmond, Bridesburg, Wissinoming & Kensington remained the core of N.C. students.

=== Post World War II ===
1946 found North filled beyond capacity. Enrollment was 4,050, and additional freshman annexes were opened at St Anne, St Bartholomew, St Adalbert, St Helena, and other grade schools.

The Alumni Association designed and constructed a shrine to honor those alumni who gave their lives in World War II. On June 5, 1949, the school dedicated the shrine of Our Lady of Fatima to the 183 North Catholic alumni who paid the supreme sacrifice. Since 1949 that total has risen to 265 Alumni who have died for their country.

By 1948, the student population had grown to over 4,300 students. Due to the overcrowding at North, the Archdiocese took some students from traditional feeder parishes like Visitation BVM in Kensington and sent them across town on the "El" to attend West Catholic during the early 1950s. These students sometimes referred to themselves as "The lost boys of North" since their male family members before and after them usually attended North. This was ended once Father Judge and Cardinal Dougherty were built in the mid-1950s.

September 1953 saw Northeast Catholic recognized as the world's largest Catholic high school for boys. Enrollment peaked at 4,726 students from 98 parishes was served by 109 Oblates, 9 nuns, and 14 laypeople. The school year beginning September 1954 marked the first decrease in enrollment in a decade because of the newly opened Father Judge High School, which was founded in 1954 to relieve overcrowding at Northeast Catholic.

September 1955 was remarkable in that, for the first time in 16 years, first-year students attended classes in the Main Building. On June 8, 1956, 1,103 seniors graduated-the largest class ever. In the 1950s, three graduates, Frank Fendler '52, Tom Keifer '53, and Jack Meehan '53, were appointed to and graduated from the U.S. Naval Academy.

=== The 60s forward ===
The 1958 academic year showed an enrollment below 3000 for the first time in 20 years. In September 1960, Rev. Edward Conlin replaced Fr. Tocik as Rector of Northeast Catholic. In September 1962, Rev. Edward Corcoran, Class of 1932, replaced Fr. Conlin as Rector—the first time an alumnus headed the school.

The fall of 1963 marked the seventh consecutive Catholic League title for the soccer team, and they repeated in 1964. They also won City Titles in 1959 & 1962.

North Catholic's Drama Department became well known in the city for producing top-notch shows. The department's "golden years" between 1967 and 1973 had some of the best shows in the school's history. For many of those years, the school did a comedy in the fall, a drama in the winter, and a musical in the spring. The school's impressive band, featured in its concerts, was among the highlights of the spring musical.

The 1967 Basketball team led by Hank Siemiontkowski took the PCL and City Championships. But it was the 1968 basketball season that brought national recognition to Northeast Catholic. On the day of the 1st round of the Catholic League playoffs, Jack Friel, Hon. 1970, the Head coach and school disciplinarian chose to suspend the entire varsity team due to a violation of team rules. Instead, the junior varsity team took the floor at the Palestra and defeated Bishop McDevitt High. The incredible story made national news.

The 1971 school year was marked by the Model U.N. Debating team, coached by Rev. John J.Hurley, OSFS, winning a first-place award at the Harvard University Model U.N. with an all junior lineup. In 1973, North captured first-place awards at the Harvard Model U.N. Championship for the third consecutive year. In 1974, the Model U.N. Debating team, under the coaching of Rev. John J.Hurley, OSFS, won the first national championship in the school's history. President Richard M. Nixon invited the team to the White House Rose Garden for a recognition ceremony. Nixon's resignation in August 1974 derailed the ceremony, and it was never held. The Debate team continued its streak by taking the National Championships in Washington, DC, in 1975 and the bicentennial year, 1976.

In the fall of 1977, the school year opened with 2,384 students. North Catholic Baseball won the PCL & City Titles in the Spring of 1977. 1978 marked the 50th Anniversary of the North-Frankford football rivalry. A large crowd of over 20,000 was present at Vet Stadium to see North win 21-14.

The Soccer team won the PCL title in 1974 and the Catholic League & City Titles in 1970, 1975, 1977, 1978 & 1979. The City Title was discontinued in 1980. When it was reinstated by PIAA in 2008, North again took the PCL & City titles. The 1981 & 1986 Falcons won two more PCL Baseball crowns.

In the winter of 1989, there were 1,172 students, including 11 black persons. Around that time, there were two fights between black and white students. By December 26, every black student in the 12th grade (senior class) had left the school: one student who had involvement in two fights was expelled, and four others voluntarily changed schools. One white student was expelled, and that student and two others received criminal charges for ethnic intimidation, conspiracy, simple assault, and recklessly endangering another person.

=== 2001–present ===
In 1989, under the guidance of Rev. John Hurley OSFS, the Model U.N. Debating team began another rise towards national recognition, taking second place in the North American Invitational Model U.N. (NAIMUN), then the largest Model U.N. event in the world. This was followed by first-place wins at NAIMUM in 1990 and 1991. In May 2006, 2007, and 2008, Northeast Catholic High School, in cooperation with Father Judge High School and Salesianum School, won the UNA-USA World Championships held in the United Nations in New York City.

In 2007, North Catholic added a brand new computer lab and Information Technology Academy. Students achieved certification in various Microsoft applications. In addition to computer courses, there was a computer workshop where students learned how to repair computers and see the inner workings of the hard drive and monitor. North had a three to one student to computer ratio, which was the highest in the city. I.T. certification and computer literacy courses were included in the students' tuition at no extra cost. Adults could also take computer courses in the evening toward certification. It had been hoped that the fees from the adult education component would help fund the school, but that portion of the program did not develop.

N.C. also developed a cartoonist society and journalism course to help prepare students for various careers. North's 15-to-1 student-to-teacher ratio was also the best in the Archdiocese. Entering the 2000s, North Catholic teachers were among the longest-tenured in the Archdiocese.

Before closing, the Language Department offered Latin, Spanish, German, and French. In 2009, the school also provided Chinese and Italian. The Language Department also offered a Greek language course for students who excel in Latin and other languages in the summer. In June 2008, eight students traveled to the Yucatán peninsula in Mexico with the Spanish Club.

North Catholic had several graduates accepted into the University of Pennsylvania's Wharton School for Business. N.C. also sent many graduates to the Pennsylvania State University, the Philadelphia Big 5, and Drexel University. North had a strong connection with Saint Joseph's University, La Salle University, and Temple University.

=== Closing ===
On October 8, 2009, Cardinal Justin Rigali announced the school's closure, effective the end of the 2009–2010 school year, along with Cardinal Dougherty High School. The decision was based on an Archdiocese Catholic Education Office report. In its final year, enrollment was 551, dropping 29% in the last decade and was forecasted to decline by an additional 24% in the following three years, leading to the closure decision. Bishop Joseph P. McFadden, the Archdiocese education vicar, noted a 1993 Coopers & Lybrand study on the archdiocese' high-school system sustainability that recommended closing two schools, including North Catholic. "We thought the school deserved the chance to grow and flourish, and everyone worked very hard to do that. Ultimately, we weren't successful, but it was not for lack of effort."

Some students transferred to Father Judge High School, which had agreed to accept Northeast's financial aid packages. Others transferred to Roman Catholic, Archbishop Ryan High School or Bishop McDevitt High School. When Northeast Catholic High School closed in June 2010, all records were sent to Father Judge High School.

Fifteen months after its closure, the building that housed North Catholic High School for 84 years was sold to a charter school. In September 2011, The Marianna Bracetti Academy Charter School purchased the North Catholic building and campus at 1842 Torresdale Ave. from the Roman Catholic Archdiocese of Philadelphia for $3.5 million.

Due to the refusal to keep the school open for one more year to allow a transition to the Jesuit Cristo Rey Network of high school, Jason Marquess, head of the board of the Friends of Northeast Catholic High School (FONECHS), said that they would no longer give money to the Archdiocese, but would direct their funds to college scholarships for the children of alumni. "The Archdiocese has abandoned inner-city Catholic education," said Marquess, "We're not going to support them in that decision."

The North Catholic Alumnae Association continues to award tuition assistance grants to students attending Catholic schools. Thirty -three city parishes have also closed in the last half-century.

==== Child Abuse ====
In December 2005, Oblate priest James J Behan was sentenced to twelve years probation relative to having a sexual relationship with a student from 1978 to 1980, while Behan taught at Northeast Catholic.

In January 2013, Charles Englehardt, an oblate priest, was convicted of child abuse that allegedly occurred in 1998 and 1999 at a local parish while he resided at the faculty house at the high school. The accuser's credibility has subsequently been called into question. Englehardt died in custody in November 2014 while his case was on appeal.

John McDevitt, an Oblate priest who taught at the high school in the 1970s, was revealed as a child molester in a lawsuit settlement by the Oblates in 2011.

== Academics ==
All NC students had to complete four years of English and theology, three years of mathematics, science, and social studies, one year of physical education/health, and a half year in word processing and service. Electives were available in foreign languages (French, German, Latin, and Spanish), television production, computer science, business/accounting, journalism, art, and music.

=== Online AP Classes ===
A new AP ON-Line program began in September 2007.

Several students chose A.P. courses offered in conjunction with College Board and Keystone Virtual.

In addition to the A.P. classes offered in school (Literature, Language, and Calculus), the following A.P. courses were offered online: European History, U.S. History, U.S. Government, and Psychology.

== Student life ==
=== Clubs ===
- Audio-Visual
- Band
- Biology Club
- Chess Club
- Community Service
- Diversity Team
- Drama
- Drum Line
- Mathletes
- Ministry Team
- Mock Trial
- Model UN
- National Honor Society
- Newspaper
- NCTV - North Catholic Television
- PC-Technicians
- Peer Meditation
- Polish Club
- Prom Planning
- Renaissance
- Student Government
- Stage Crew
- Yearbook

== Athletics ==
North Catholic participated in the Philadelphia Catholic League (PCL) since 1926 as well as the PIAA since 2008 in the following sports: baseball, basketball, bowling, crew, cross country, football, indoor track and field, golf, lacrosse, outdoor track and field, soccer, and wrestling. Swimming & Tennis also had teams that the school discontinued before it closed. North also skated an Ice Hockey Club Team & had a Rugby Club Team. Even though the school was closed, the hockey team played for one final season with varsity and junior varsity teams. Among those coaching the team were Timothy McCrane, class of 82, Art Myers, class of 81, and Michael Gorey, class of 78. Michael also played for North's first hockey team in 77-78 and started that first team. There was also an archery club team in 77-78. During World War II and Korean War, North had an Aviation Club, which helped prepare graduates for service in the U.S. Armed forces.

In September 1927, North Catholic entered an inter-scholastic competition with a football schedule of eight games. Their first win was over LaSalle 7–6 at the old Frankford Stadium.

The 1929 Basketball team would win the school its first Catholic League Championship. The Falcons also won in 1932 & 1935. The 1929 soccer team (class of '30) won the City Title in soccer (soccer was not a PCL sport at this time).

From 1934 to 1937, North's Football team, coached by Si Simendinger featuring players like future NFL stars Frank Reagan and Bucko Kilroy, won four straight League Championships.

The North Catholic Football Team under Head Coach Jack Gillepie won League titles in '49, '50, '52, and '56, and City Titles in three of those four years. The basketball team returned to its glory days of the 1930s by winning back-to-back PCL championships in 1956 & 1957. They also won the 1956 City Title.

The NC baseball team won its 11th PCL crown in 1995. Soccer continued to be a playoff contender every season, with PCL titles in 1990, 1999, 2001, 2002, and 2008. North again took the city soccer title when the City Championship series was reinstated by the PIAA in 2008. The wrestling team, which began in the mid-1970s, became the most dominant sport at North from 1990. From 1991 until its closing in 2010, the N.C. wrestling team won a league-best 13 PCL team titles in 20 years. The bowling team also won the PCL title three years in a row (2005, 2006, and 2007).

- From 1926 until its closing in 2010, North Catholic won more Philadelphia Catholic League Championships, in soccer (22), bowling (18), wrestling (13), and baseball (11) than any other Philadelphia Catholic High school. They also had eight titles each in football, basketball, and swimming.
- Frank Thomas Nordell of Northeast Catholic H.S. won the National Interscholastic Cross Country Championship on Thanksgiving Day, November 28, 1929. He ran the 2.7 mile Branch Brook Park Course in Newark, NJ, in 13:43, winning by 13 seconds. This was the fourth national championship Meet, hosted by Newark Prep, and drew 20 teams from Maine to Virginia. Curtis HS of Staten Island (then part of Brooklyn) won the team championship. North did not enter a team; Frank ran as an individual. His photo appeared on the front page of the Newark Star Eagle and N.Y. Times Sports Pages in his N.C. singlet on 11/29/1929.
- In 1956, North won the PCL championship in soccer, football, basketball & baseball. They also won the City Title in three out of the four sports.
- The North Catholic soccer team did not lose a single PCL contest in 116 straight games stretching from 1959 to 1968. Their most recent PCL Titles were in 2001, 2002 & 2008. In March 2008, the soccer program inducted 12 of its greatest players to the newly established "N.C. Soccer Hall of Fame."
- From 1991 until its closing in 2010, the N.C. wrestling team won 13 PCL team titles.
- The bowling team won three consecutive PCL titles in 2005, 2006, and 2007.
- In the 2007 - 2008 year, N.C. teams qualified for the playoffs in Football, Soccer, Bowling, Basketball & Wrestling.
- In 2008, the basketball team, wrestling team & soccer team were all PCL champions in their sport.

LIST OF NORTH CATHOLIC FALCONS PHILADELPHIA CATHOLIC LEAGUE CHAMPIONS

- Football - 1934, 1935, 1936, 1937, 1949, 1950, 1952, 1956
- Soccer - 1929, 1931, 1933, 1934, 1937, 1952, 1955, 1957, 1958, 1959, 1960, 1961, 1962, 1963, 1964, 1965, 1966, 1967, 1970, 1974, 1975, 1977, 1978, 1979, 1990, 1999, 2001, 2002, 2008 (Soccer Champs before 1957 were part of an informal city league format not PCL)
- Basketball - 1929, 1932, 1935, 1956, 1957, 1967, 1987, 2008
- Wrestling - 1991, 1992, 1994, 1995, 1997, 1998, 1999, 2001, 2003, 2004, 2005, 2006, 2008
- Baseball - 1934, 1945, 1947, 1949, 1950, 1952, 1956, 1977, 1981, 1986, 1995
- Track - 1936, 1937, 1941, 1945, 1946, 1966
- Cross Country - 1941, 1944, 1946, 1947
- Bowling - 1939, 1940, 1941, 1953, 1954, 1958, 1962, 1965, 1966, 1967, 1969, 1971, 1973, 1993, 2005, 2006, 2007, 2010
- Swimming - 1937, 1940, 1941, 1942, 1943, 1944, 1945, 1953
- Crew - 1944, 1945

== Traditions ==
=== Rectors/Principals of Northeast Catholic High ===
- Rev. Joseph F. Butler, OSFS, 1926
- Rev. Thomas A. Lawless, OSFS, 1928
- Rev. William A. Stahl, OSFS, 1934
- Rev. Thomas A. Lawless, OSFS, 1938
- Rev. Edward F. Smith, OSFS, 1943
- Rev. John F. Tocik, OSFS, 1949
- Rev. Edward F. Conlin, OSFS, 1960
- Rev. Edward J. Corcoran, OSFS, '32, 1962
- Rev. William A. Guerin, OSFS, '47, 1969
- Rev. Joseph J. Toner, OSFS, '45, 1974
- Rev. James E. Dalton, OSFS, 1982
- Rev. Michael S. Murray, OSFS, 1992
- Rev. Nicholas R. Waseline, OSFS, 1997

=== Presidents of Northeast Catholic High ===
- Rev Thomas Curran, OSFS, 1993
- Rev Michael S. Murray, OSFS, 1997
- Rev Mark J. Wrightson, OSFS, 1998
- Rev Vincent Smith, OSFS '74, 2001
- Mr. Stanley R Witalec '66, 2007
- Rev Vincent Smith, OSFS '74, 2009

=== Thanksgiving Day Football Game - North Catholic vs Frankford HS ===
- North played Frankford High School every year in the "Turkey Bowl" on Thanksgiving Day at 9:45 AM, making it the earliest high-school football game in the country on Thanksgiving.

October 5, 1928, marked the traditional neighborhood rivalry game between "North & Frankford". Frankford won the game 20-7. In 1930 the game against Frankford would be played on Thanksgiving morning and continue uninterrupted for 80 years until the final game in 2009, with North prevailing 26–22 on a last-second T.D.

From 1930 to 2009, This annual football game was traditionally played on Thanksgiving morning at 9:45 AM - making it the first game played in America each Thanksgiving Day. In the 82 games played during the series, North led the rivalry 43–35–4. The games have been played at Temple U Stadium, Franklin Field, Shibe Park, Frankford Memorial Stadium & Veteran's Stadium (for the 50th Anniversary game). Crowds for some of the games were more than 20,000.

Year by Year results in North Catholic vs. Frankford series, North 43 wins -FKD 35 wins -Ties 4

- 2009: North Catholic 28, Frankford 22
- 2008: Frankford 14, North Catholic 6
- 2007: Frankford 47, North Catholic 21
- 2006: North Catholic 23, Frankford 14 - FKD was PPL Champ
- 2005: North Catholic 12, Frankford 0 - FKD was PPL Champ
- 2004: Frankford 20, North Catholic 14
- 2003: Frankford 49, North Catholic 28 - FKD was PPL Champ
- 2002: Frankford 41, North Catholic 12 - FKD was PPL Champ
- 2001: North Catholic 20, Frankford 9
- 2000: Frankford 32, North Catholic 0
- 1999: Frankford 27, North Catholic 13
- 1998: Frankford 27, North Catholic 20
- 1997: Frankford 54, North Catholic 14 - FKD was PPL Champ
- 1996: North Catholic 20, Frankford 19 - FKD was PPL Champ
- 1995: Frankford 41, North Catholic 21
- 1994: Frankford 24, North Catholic 14
- 1993: Frankford 21, North Catholic 7
- 1992: North Catholic 14, Frankford 12
- 1991: Frankford 28, North Catholic 0
- 1990: North Catholic 18, Frankford 14
- 1989: Frankford 14, North Catholic 12
- 1988: North Catholic 28, Frankford 0
- 1987: Frankford 34, North Catholic 17 - FKD was PPL Champ
- 1986: North Catholic 14, Frankford 13 - FKD was PPL Champ
- 1985: North Catholic 21, Frankford 13
- 1984: North Catholic 35, Frankford 6 - FKD was PPL Champ
- 1983: Frankford 27, North Catholic 9
- 1982: Frankford 34, North Catholic 15
- 1981: Frankford 13, North Catholic 6 - FKD was PPL Champ
- 1980: Frankford 20, North Catholic 0 - FKD was PPL Champ
- 1979: North Catholic 7, Frankford 6
- 1978: North Catholic 21, Frankford 14 - FKD was PPL & City Champ
- 1977: Frankford 7, North Catholic 0
- 1976: Frankford 28, North Catholic 0
- 1975: Frankford 30, North Catholic 0 - FKD was PPL Champ
- 1974: Frankford 12, North Catholic 7
- 1973: North Catholic 14, Frankford 0 - FKD was PPL Champ
- 1972: North Catholic 12, Frankford 12 - FKD was PPL Champ
- 1971: Frankford 24, North Catholic 8 - FKD was PPL Champ
- 1970: North Catholic 49, Frankford 14
- 1969: North Catholic 24, Frankford 14 - FKD was PPL Champ
- 1968: Frankford 14, North Catholic 8
- 1967: North Catholic 28, Frankford 8
- 1966: Frankford 8, North Catholic 0
- 1965: North Catholic 20, Frankford 0
- 1964: North Catholic 12, Frankford 10 - FKD was PPL Champ
- 1963: North Catholic 30, Frankford 14
- 1962: North Catholic 6, Frankford 6
- 1961: North Catholic 14, Frankford 0
- 1960: North Catholic 20, Frankford 13 - FKD was PPL Champ
- 1959: Frankford 12, North Catholic 6
- 1958: North Catholic 27, Frankford 12
- 1957: Frankford 40, North Catholic 14
- 1956: North Catholic 28, Frankford 13 - N.C. was PCL & City Champ
- 1955: Frankford 13, North Catholic 0
- 1954: North Catholic 31, Frankford 12 - FKD was PPL Champ
- 1953: North Catholic 14, Frankford 6
- 1952: North Catholic 30, Frankford 6 - N.C. was PCL & City Champ
- 1951: North Catholic 7, Frankford 2
- 1950: North Catholic 7, Frankford 0 - N.C. was PCL Champ
- 1949: North Catholic 19, Frankford 12 - N.C. was PCL & City Champ
- 1948: North Catholic 13, Frankford 7 - FKD was PPL & City Champ
- 1947: North Catholic 19, Frankford 13 - FKD was PPL Champ
- 1946: North Catholic 6, Frankford 0
- 1945: North Catholic 7, Frankford 0
- 1944: Frankford 0, North Catholic 0
- 1943: North Catholic 19, Frankford 0
- 1942: North Catholic 20, Frankford 0
- 1941: Frankford 16, North Catholic 0
- 1940: Frankford 20, North Catholic 6 - FKD was PPL & City Champ
- 1939: Frankford 18, North Catholic 6
- 1938: North Catholic 13, Frankford 6
- 1937: Frankford 6, North Catholic 0 - N.C. was PCL Champ
- 1936: North Catholic 6, Frankford 0 - N.C. was PCL Champ & FKD was PPL Champ
- 1935: North Catholic 19, Frankford 0 - N.C. was PCL Champ
- 1934: North Catholic 26, Frankford 0 - N.C. was PCL Champ
- 1933: North Catholic 23, Frankford 6 - FKD was PPL Champ
- 1932: Frankford 22, North Catholic 0
- 1931: North Catholic 0, Frankford 0
- 1930: North Catholic 14, Frankford 7
- 1929: North Catholic 2, Frankford 0
- 1928: Frankford 20, North Catholic 7

== Notable alumni ==
- Eddie Alvarez '01 - All-Catholic Wrestler with over 100 career wins, Professional Mixed Martial Artist, Two time & former Bellator MMA Lightweight Champion, former UFC Lightweight champion
- Jerry Buckley '50 - National Cartoonists Society award winner
- Gene Chyzowych '53 - NSCAA Hall of Fame member and former U.S. Men's National Soccer Team Coach. High School soccer Coach for 51 years. 3rd most wins in U.S. soccer history (757) at Columbia HS in North Jersey.
- Angel Cruz '85 - former Democratic member of the Pennsylvania House of Representatives
- Don D'Ambra '90 - player-coach and leading scorer in Philadelphia Kixx soccer history, currently St Joseph's U Men's soccer coach
- Samuel P. De Bow, Jr. - National Oceanic and Atmospheric Administration (NOAA) Commissioned Officer Corps rear admiral, director of the NOAA Commissioned Officer Corps from 2003 to 2007.
- John Doman '62 - Television & Film actor. He is famous for his role as Deputy Police Commissioner William Rawls in HBO's "The Wire" from 2002 through 2008.
- Frank Lefty Hoerst '35 - Major League pitcher with the Phillies in the 1940s. A 2-sport standout in High school and college (baseball & basketball). He was inducted into the LaSalle University Athletic Hall of Fame.
- John Idzik '46 - U of Maryland football standout and NFL Asst coach for Eagles and N.Y. Jets
- Bil Keane '40 - creator of The Family Circus comic
- Bob (Hird) Kelly '81 - Local traffic reporter and T.V. personality
- Frank "Bucko" Kilroy '39 - All-Pro lineman for Philadelphia Eagles during Championships of 1948 & 1949. Also, an NFL scout and G.M. for Cowboys & N.E. Patriots.
- Gerard A. Kosinski '72 - former Democratic member of the Pennsylvania House of Representatives.
- Joe Maneely '44 - comic book artist for Marvel Comics
- Walt Masterson '38 - Major League pitcher for 16 seasons (1939–56) with the Washington Senators, Boston Red Sox, and Detroit Tigers. He compiled a 77–100 record.
- Bernard "Benny" McLaughlin '46 - a member of the U.S. National & U.S. Olympic Soccer teams (1948-1957) earned 12 Caps. Member of National Soccer Hall of Fame & Temple U Athletic Hall of Fame. He also played Professional soccer for many years.
- Bobby McNeil '56 - former Pro Basketball player and 3-time 1st Team Big Five All-Star guard. Inducted in Saint Joseph's University Athletic Hall of Fame
- Michael H. O'Brien '72 - Pennsylvania State Representative
- Dennis Patrick '35 - the stage name of noted actor of screen and T.V., real last name was Harrison
- Frank Reagan '37 - 1st Team All-American football player for U of Pennsylvania in 1940. He played for the New York Giants and Philadelphia Eagles in the NFL during the 1940s and 1950s. He won a World Championship with the '49 Eagles. Later, Head football Coach & A.D. at Villanova U. Inducted into U of Pennsylvania Athletic Hall of Fame.
- Hank Siemiontkowski '68 - NCAA Basketball All-Tournament Team for Villanova University in 1971
- Joseph F. Smith '39 - U.S. Representative for Pennsylvania's 3rd district from 1981 to 1983
- Joe Verdeur '44 - U.S. Olympic gold medalist 1948 in swimming. Inducted into U.S. National Swimming Hall of Fame & voted greatest American swimmer of the 1st half-century.
- Jack Whitaker '41 - Emmy award winning American sportscaster, inducted into the National Sportscasters and Sportswriters Hall of Fame. Best known for calling Triple Crown Horse Racing & Golf's Major tournaments on television. Also worked early Super Bowls and CBS Sports Spectacular. Also inducted into St Joseph's University Hall of Fame. Died August 18, 2019.
- James Williams '68 - Philadelphia Labor Union

== See also ==
- Roman Catholic Archdiocese of Philadelphia
- Philadelphia Catholic League
- Northeast Philadelphia
