= Chad M. Cary =

NOAA Corps Director

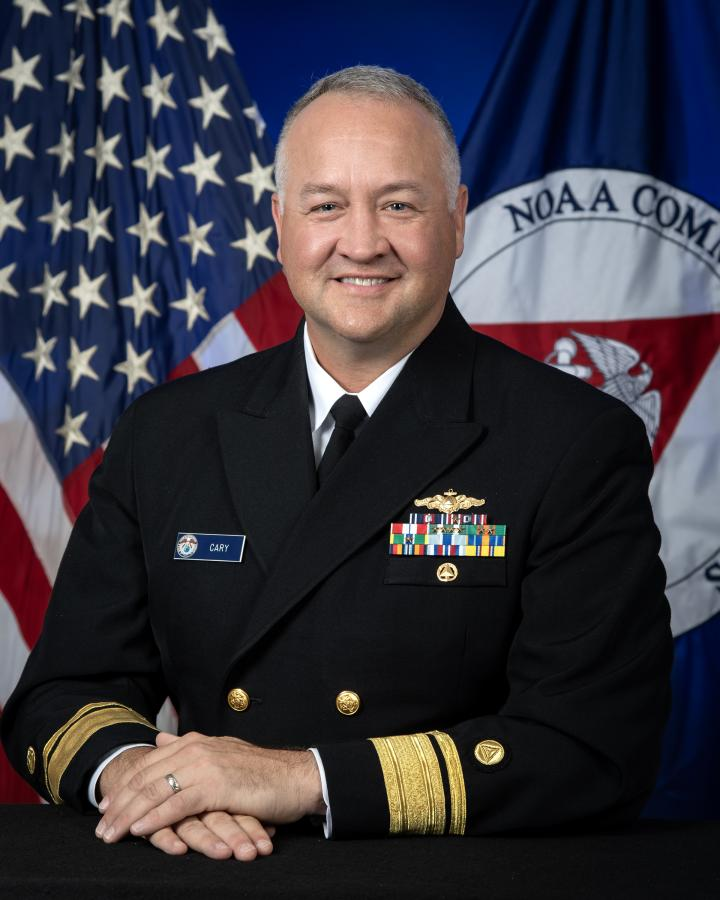
- Born: Cordova, Alaska
- Allegiance: United States
- Branch: NOAA Commissioned Officer Corps
- Service years: 2001–present
- Rank: Rear Admiral
- Commands: NOAAS Reuben Lasker; NOAAS Henry B. Bigelow; NOAAS Nancy Foster; NOAAS John N. Cobb; NOAA Office of Marine and Aviation Operations; NOAA Commissioned Officer Corps
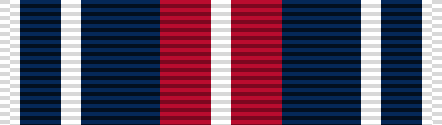
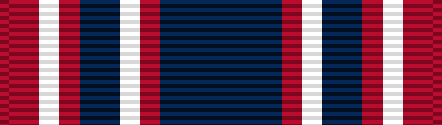
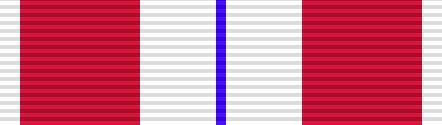
- Awards: Department of Commerce Gold Medal Department of Commerce Bronze Medal NOAA Corps Meritorious Service Medal
- Education: University of North Carolina at Chapel Hill (BS); Portland State University (MS); Georgetown University (Graduate certificate)

Chad M. Cary is a rear admiral in the National Oceanic and Atmospheric Administration (NOAA) Commissioned Officer Corps who serves as Director, NOAA Commissioned Officer Corps, and Assistant Administrator, NOAA Office of Marine and Aviation Operations.

== Early life and education ==
Cary was born in Cordova, Alaska, and raised in Juneau, Alaska. He received a bachelor of science in environmental science with an emphasis in marine sciences from the University of North Carolina at Chapel Hill before joining the NOAA Corps and later a Master of Science in geography from Portland State University and a graduate certificate in legislative studies from Georgetown University.

== Career ==
Upon graduation from the University of North Carolina, Cary was commissioned as an officer in the NOAA Commissioned Officer Corps in 2001. As of 2024, he had served during his NOAA Corps career for nine years at sea, including tours as commanding officer of the NOAA research ships NOAAS Reuben Lasker, NOAAS Henry B. Bigelow, NOAAS Nancy Foster, and NOAAS John N. Cobb, and for 13 years ashore, including duty with the National Marine Fisheries Service and two different offices at the National Weather Service, at NOAA headquarters, and as Director, Commissioned Personnel Center. He graduated from NOAA's Leadership Competencies Development Program and serves both formally and informally as a mentor.

While in command of Reuben Lasker, Cary led a team which used a modern suite of instrumentation to study the ecosystem of the eastern Pacific Ocean from Mexico to Canada. During his time in the Leadership Competencies Development Program he completed a detail with the United States Coast Guard's Office of Cutter Forces that advanced a key NOAA facility initiative and built a partnership alliance with the U.S. Coast Guard and the United States Navy that remained in place as of 2020.

Cary was promoted to rear admiral (lower half) on 22 November 2021 and began a tour of duty in Silver Spring, Maryland, that day as deputy director, NOAA Commissioned Corps and deputy director, Office of Marine and Aviation Operations. On 1 August 2024 the United States Senate confirmed his appointment to succeed Vice Admiral Nancy Hann as Director, NOAA Commissioned Corps and Director, Office of Marine and Aviation Operations.

== Personal life ==
Cary and his wife Dayna have three children and have resided in Sandwich, Massachusetts, since 2015. They are active in community and school activities. Cary volunteers as a coach and enjoys outdoor activities, including hiking.

== Awards and decorations ==
Cary's more notable awards include:

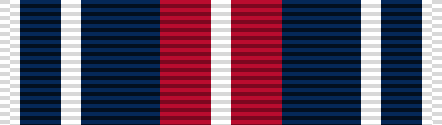
Department of Commerce Gold Medal
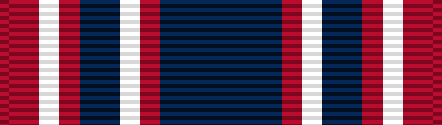
Department of Commerce Bronze Medal (two awards)
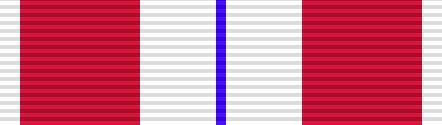
NOAA Corps Meritorious Service Medal

Cary received the Department of Commerce Gold Medal for hurricane support. He received the Department of Commerce Bronze Medal twice, for river forecasting during a record flood event in the Pacific Northwest and for John N. Cobb′s outstanding safety record during his tour in command of her.

Military offices
Preceded by Nancy Hann	Director of the National Oceanic and Atmospheric Administration Commissioned Corps; 2024–	Incumbent
