= North East High School =

North East High School may refer to:

- North East High School (Kansas) — Arma, Kansas
- North East High School (Maryland) — North East, Maryland
- North East High School (Pennsylvania) — North East, Pennsylvania

== See also ==
- Northeast High School (disambiguation)
- Northeastern High School (disambiguation)
