= Jerry Buckley (cartoonist) =

American cartoonist (1932–2000)

Gerald Bernard Buckley (August 10, 1932 – April 27, 2000) was an American cartoonist who also worked as an art director and a college professor.

== About ==
Gerald Bernard Buckley was born on August 10, 1932 in the Philadelphia, Pennsylvania neighborhood of Kensington, and attended parochial school at Ascension Parochial School and Northeast Catholic High School, graduating in 1950. He was inducted into that school’s Hall of Fame in 1996, along with Bil Keane. He attended the Philadelphia College of Art, during college, worked part-time at the N. W. Ayer & Son advertising agency in Philadelphia.

Buckley taught at the Philadelphia College of Art, the Philadelphia Art Institute, and the Bucks County Community College.

Buckley worked at the Express Newspapers in Bucks County, Pennsylvania and Mail newspapers of Burlington County, New Jersey. His editorial cartoons appeared in various local newspapers. He received the National Cartoonist Society Advertising and Illustration Award for 1994 and the Reuben Advertising plaque that very same year which was his third nomination in 9 years.

Buckley was married Shirley and lived in Levittown. He died of bacterial pneumonia in Langhorne, Pennsylvania on April 27, 2000, at the age of 67.
