= Northeast College =

Northeast College is a community college based in Houston, Texas. Part of the Houston Community College System, it serves the Northeast and Northern portions of the city. Northeast College consists of three satellite campuses: Northeast Campus, Northline Campus and Pinemont Center.

== Northeast Campus ==
The HCC Northeast Campus is located in a heavily industrialized part of northeast Houston. Consisting of Codwell Hall, the campus opened in 1999.

== Northline Campus ==
The HCC Northline Campus is located near the grounds of Northline Commons shopping center. The campus opened in 2008, replacing the Northline Mall Center when the declining mall (where classes were formerly held) was demolished.

== Pinemont Center ==
The HCC Pinemont Center is located technically in the Northwest side of Houston, although it is not part of the Northwest College area.
