= NOAA Commissioned Officer Corps =

US federal uniformed service

National Oceanic and Atmospheric Administration Commissioned Officer Corps
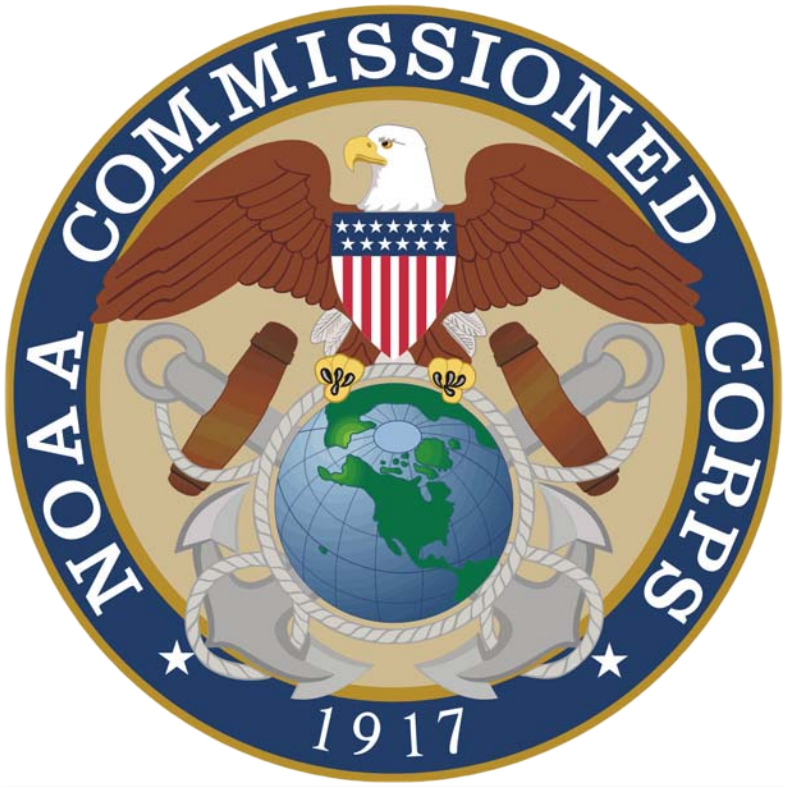
- Emblem of the NOAA Commissioned Officer Corps
- Founded: 22 May 1917 (109 years, 5 months)
- Country: United States
- Type: Uniformed service
- Size: 330 officers 15 ships 10 aircraft
- Part of: NOAA
- Garrison/HQ: Silver Spring, Maryland, U.S.
- Nickname: "NOAA Corps"
- Mottos: "Science, service, stewardship."
- Colors
- March: "Forward with NOAA" (1988–2017); "Into the Oceans and the Air" (2017–present)
- Engagements: World War I; World War II; Cold War; War on terror
- Website: NOAA Corps

Commanders
- Commander-in-Chief: President Donald Trump
- Secretary of Commerce: Howard Lutnick
- Under Secretary of Commerce for Oceans and Atmosphere (Note: Officeholder is the ex-officio Administrator of NOAA): Neil Jacobs
- Director, NOAA Commissioned Officer Corps (Note: Also concurrently serves as Assistant Administrator, Office of Marine and Aviation Operations<): RADM Chad M. Cary
- Notable commanders: VADM H. Arnold Karo; VADM Michael S. Devany; VADM Nancy A. Hann

Insignia
- Flag

Aircraft flown
- Reconnaissance: WP-3D, G-IV, 350CER & 360CER, DHC-6-300

The National Oceanic and Atmospheric Administration Commissioned Officer Corps (informally the NOAA Corps) is one of eight federal uniformed services of the United States, and operates under the National Oceanic and Atmospheric Administration (NOAA), a scientific agency overseen by the Department of Commerce. The NOAA Corps is made up of scientifically and technically trained officers. The NOAA Corps and the United States Public Health Service Commissioned Corps are the only U.S. uniformed services that consist only of commissioned officers, with no enlisted or warrant officer ranks. The NOAA Corps' primary mission is to monitor oceanic conditions, support major waterways, and monitor atmospheric conditions.

The NOAA Corps traces its origins to the establishment of the United States Coast and Geodetic Survey Corps on May 22, 1917, which the service recognizes as its official date of establishment. The Coast and Geodetic Survey Corps became the Environmental Science Services Administration Corps in 1965, which in turn became the NOAA Corps in 1970.

== Mission ==
The NOAA Corps is the smallest of the eight uniformed services of the United States government. It has over 300 commissioned officers, but no enlisted or warrant officer personnel. The NOAA Corps today employs professionals trained in engineering, earth sciences, oceanography, meteorology, fisheries science, and other related disciplines. NOAA Corps officers operate NOAA ships, fly NOAA aircraft, manage research projects, conduct diving operations, and serve in staff positions throughout NOAA, as well as in positions in the United States Merchant Marine, the United States Department of Defense, the United States Coast Guard, the National Aeronautics and Space Administration, and the United States Department of State. Like its predecessors, the Coast and Geodetic Survey Corps and the ESSA Corps, the NOAA Corps provides a source of technically skilled officers which can be incorporated into the United States Armed Forces in times of war, and in peacetime supports defense requirements in addition to its non-military scientific projects. Should it be called into active duty, it would be a department of one of the six branches of the U.S. Armed Forces.

== History ==
=== Early history ===
The NOAA Commissioned Officer Corps traces its roots to the United States Coast and Geodetic Survey, the oldest scientific agency of the federal government. The Coast and Geodetic Survey was founded as the United States Survey of the Coast under President Thomas Jefferson in 1807 and renamed the United States Coast Survey in 1836. Until the American Civil War (1861–1865), the Coast Survey was staffed by civilian personnel working with United States Army and United States Navy officers. During the American Civil War, Army officers were withdrawn from Coast Survey duty, never to return, while all but two Navy officers also were withdrawn from Coast Survey service for the duration of the war. Since most men of the Survey had Union sympathies, most stayed on with the Survey rather than resigning to serve the Confederate States of America; their work shifted in emphasis to support of the United States Navy and Union Army, and these Coast Surveyors are the professional ancestors of today's NOAA Corps. Those Coast Surveyors supporting the Union Army were given assimilated military rank while attached to a specific command, but those supporting the U.S. Navy operated as civilians and ran the risk of being executed as spies if captured by the Confederates while working in support of Union forces. After the war, U.S. Navy officers returned to duty with the Coast Survey, which was given authority over geodetic activities in the interior of the United States in 1871 and was subsequently renamed the United States Coast and Geodetic Survey in 1878.

With the outbreak of the Spanish–American War in April 1898, the U.S. Navy again withdrew all of its officers from Coast and Geodetic Survey assignments. They returned after the war ended in August 1898, but the system of U.S. Navy officers and men crewing the Survey's ships that had prevailed for most of the 19th century came to an end when the appropriation law approved on June 6, 1900, provided for "all necessary employees to man and equip the vessels," instead of U.S. Navy personnel. The law took effect on July 1, 1900; at that point, all U.S. Navy personnel assigned to the Survey's ships remained aboard until the first call at each ship's home port, where they transferred off, with the Survey reimbursing the Navy for their pay accrued after July 1, 1900. From July 1900, the Coast and Geodetic Survey continued as an entirely civilian-run organization until after the United States entered World War I in April 1917.

=== Coast and Geodetic Survey Corps ===
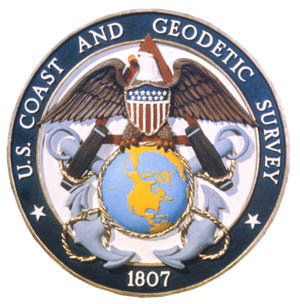
The seal of the United States Coast and Geodetic Survey, in which the NOAA Corps originated as the U.S. Coast and Geodetic Survey Corps in 1917

To avoid the dangers that Coast Survey personnel had faced during the Civil War of being executed as spies if captured by the enemy, the United States Coast and Geodetic Survey Corps was established on 22 May 1917. This gave them commissioned officer status, protecting them if they were captured while serving as surveyors on the battlefield as had happened during the Civil War. The creation of the Coast and Geodetic Survey Corps also ensured that in wartime a set of officers with technical skills in surveying could be assimilated rapidly into the United States Armed Forces so that their skills could be employed in military and naval work essential to the war effort. Before World War I ended in November 1918, over half of all Coast and Geodetic Survey Corps officers had served in the U.S. Army, U.S. Navy, or United States Marine Corps, performing duty as artillery orienteering officers, as minelaying officers in the North Sea (where they were involved in the laying of the North Sea Mine Barrage), as navigators aboard troop transports, as intelligence officers, and as officers on the staff of American Expeditionary Force commanding officer General John "Black Jack" Pershing.

The Coast and Geodetic Survey Corps returned to peacetime scientific pursuits after the war. Its first flag officer was Rear Admiral Raymond S. Patton, who was promoted from captain to rear admiral in 1936.

When the United States entered World War II in December 1941, the Coast and Geodetic Survey Corps again ended its peacetime activities to support the war effort, often seeing the front-lines in support of the rest of the armed forces. Over half of all Coast and Geodetic Survey officers were transferred to the U.S. Army, the United States Army Air Forces, the U.S. Navy, or the U.S. Marine Corps, and deployed in North Africa, Europe, the Pacific, and the defense of North America as artillery surveyors, hydrographers, amphibious engineers, beachmasters (i.e., directors of disembarkation), instructors at service schools, and in a wide variety of technical positions. They also served as reconnaissance surveyors for a worldwide aeronautical charting effort, and a Coast and Geodetic Survey officer was the first commanding officer of the Army Air Forces Aeronautical Chart Plant at St. Louis, Missouri. Three officers who remained in Coast and Geodetic Survey service were killed during the war, as were eleven other Survey personnel.

After the war ended in August 1945, the Coast and Geodetic Survey again returned to peacetime scientific duties, although a significant amount of its work in the succeeding years was related to support of military and naval requirements during the Cold War.

=== ESSA Corps ===
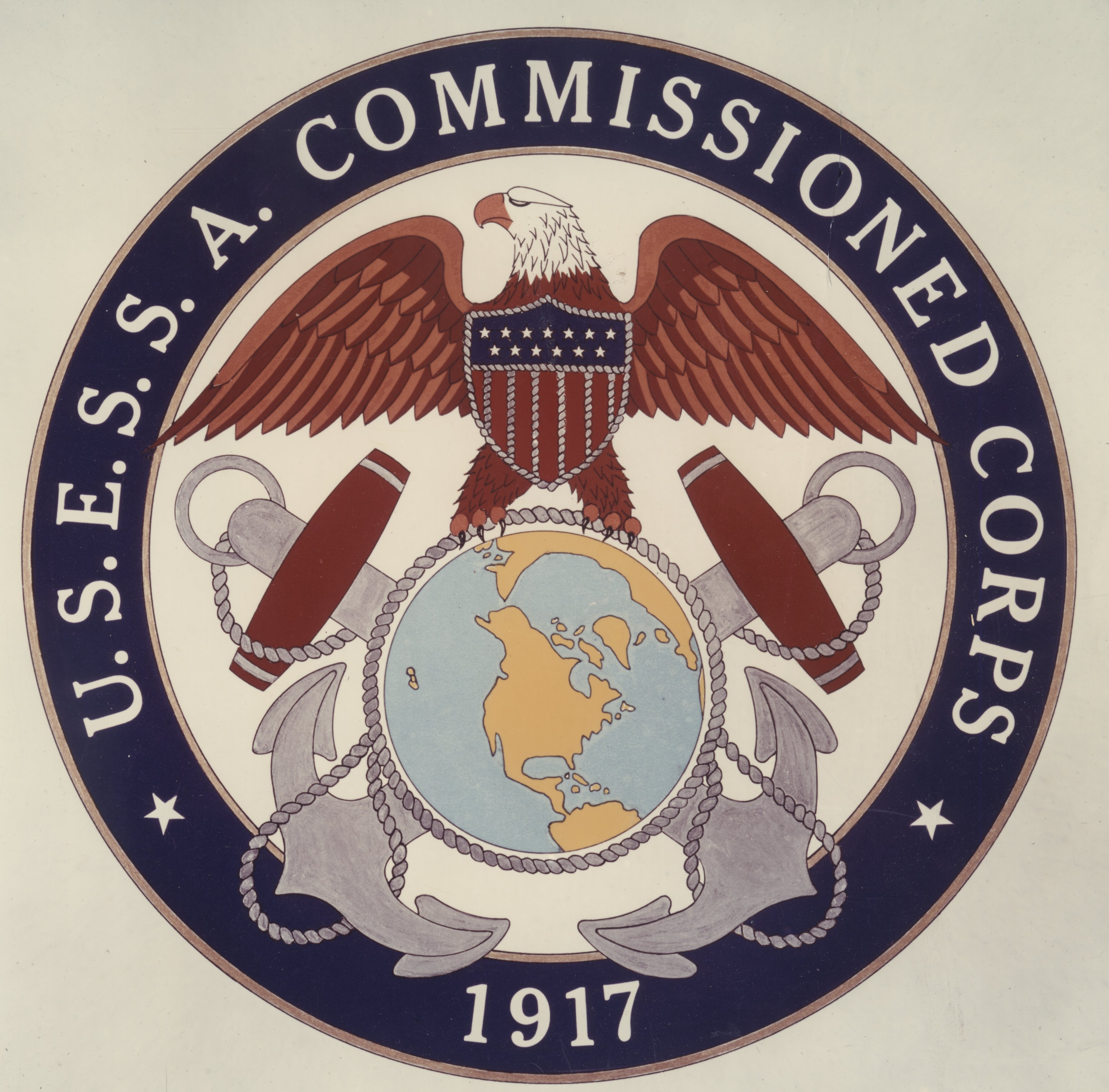
The seal of the ESSA Corps, a predecessor of the NOAA Corps that existed from 1965 to 1970

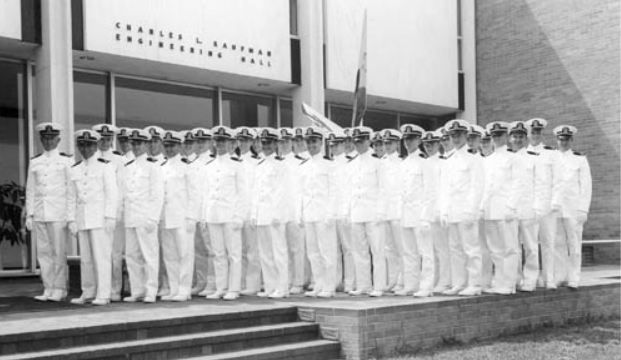
ESSA Corps Basic Officer Training Class 21, 9 September 1966

When the Coast and Geodetic Survey was transferred to the newly established Environmental Science Services Administration on July 13, 1965, control of the corps was transferred from the Coast and Geodetic Survey to ESSA itself, and accordingly, the corps was redesignated the Environmental Science Services Administration Corps, known informally as the ESSA Corps. The ESSA Corps retained the responsibility of providing commissioned officers to operate Coast and Geodetic Survey ships and of providing a set of officers with technical skills in surveying for incorporation into the U.S. armed forces during wartime.

Following the establishment of the ESSA, Rear Admiral H. Arnold Karo was promoted to vice admiral to help lead the agency. He served as the first Deputy Administrator of ESSA and was the first vice admiral, and at the time the highest-ranking officer, in the combined history of the Coast and Geodetic Survey Corps and ESSA Corps. Rear Admiral James C. Tison Jr. was the first director of the ESSA Corps.

=== NOAA Corps ===
The ESSA was replaced by the new National Oceanic and Atmospheric Administration on October 3, 1970. As a result, the ESSA Corps was redesignated the National Oceanic and Atmospheric Administration Commissioned Officer Corps, known informally as the NOAA Corps. Rear Admiral Harley D. Nygren was appointed as the first director of the new NOAA Corps.

In 1972, the NOAA Corps became the first uniformed service of the United States to recruit women on the same basis as men, and in that year it commissioned Ensign Pamela Chelgren, making her the first female commissioned officer. In 1977, Chelgren became operations officer aboard the NOAA research ship NOAAS Peirce, making her third-in-command and giving her the highest shipboard posting ever achieved by a woman in the Uniformed Services of the United States up to that time. On 1 June 2012, the NOAA research vessel RV Gloria Michelle, a boat crewed by two NOAA Corps personnel, became the first vessel in the history of NOAA or its ancestor organizations to have an all-female crew.

On 2 January 2014, Michael S. Devany was promoted to vice admiral upon assuming duties as the deputy under secretary for operations at NOAA, becoming only the second vice admiral in the combined history of the Coast and Geodetic Survey Corps, ESSA Corps, and NOAA Corps, and the first since the promotion of Vice Admiral H. Arnold Karo in 1965. On 15 July 2024, Nancy A. Hann assumed the position of Deputy Under Secretary for Operations, NOAA, and became the third person and first woman to achieve the rank of vice admiral in the combined history of the Coast and Geodetic Survey Corps, ESSA Corps, and NOAA Corps.

== Director ==
No.	Portrait	Name (lifespan)	Term of office			Notes	Ref.
No.	Portrait	Name (lifespan)	Took office	Left office	Time in office	Notes	Ref.
United States Coast and Geodetic Survey Corps
1		Ernest L. Jones (1876–1929)	1917	1929 †	11–12 years	Superintendent (title changed to "Director" in 1919) of the U.S. Coast and Geodetic Survey from 1915 until he died in 1929. As such, led the Coast and Geodetic Survey Corps from its creation in 1917 until 1929. Was a colonel and intelligence officer in the U.S. Army during World War I.	
2		Rear Admiral; Raymond S. Patton (1882–1937)	1929	1937	7–8 years	Director, U.S. Coast and Geodetic Survey, which included leadership of the Coast and Geodetic Survey Corps, from 1929 until he died in 1937. Served as director in the rank of captain until he was promoted to rear admiral in 1936. Was the first flag officer in Coast and Geodetic Survey Corps history.	
3		Rear Admiral; Leo O. Colbert (1883–1968)	1938	1950	11–12 years	Director, U.S. Coast and Geodetic Survey, from 1938 to 1950, which included leadership of the Coast and Geodetic Survey Corps.	
4		Rear Admiral; Robert F.A. Studds (1896–1962)	1950	1955	4–5 years	Director, U.S. Coast and Geodetic Survey, from 1950 to 1955, which included leadership of the Coast and Geodetic Survey Corps.	
5		Rear Admiral; H. Arnold Karo (1903–1986)	1955	1965	9–10 years	Last Director, Coast and Geodetic Survey Corps (1955–1965); served as Director of the Coast and Geodetic Survey. At end of the tour as Director, simultaneously transferred to the new ESSA Corps and received a promotion to vice admiral on 13 July 1965 to serve as Deputy Administrator, Environmental Science Services Administration (ESSA), from 1965 to 1967. The first officer in the combined history of the Coast and Geodetic Survey Corps and ESSA Corps officer to achieve the rank of vice admiral.	
United States Environmental Science Services Administration Commissioned Officer Corps (ESSA Corps)
6		Rear Admiral; James C. Tison Jr. (1908–1991)	1965	1968	2–3 years	First Director, ESSA Corps. Served simultaneously as Director, U.S. Coast and Geodetic Survey (1965–1968).	
7		Rear Admiral; Don A. Jones (1912–2000)	1968	1970	1–2 years	Last Director, ESSA Corps. Served as Director, U.S. Coast and Geodetic Survey (1968–1970). Then served in NOAA Commissioned Officer Corps and was the first Director, National Ocean Survey, from 1970 to 1972.	
National Oceanic and Atmospheric Administration Commissioned Officer Corps (NOAA Corps)
8		Rear Admiral; Harley D. Nygren (1924–2019)	1970	1981	10–11 years	First Director, NOAA Commissioned Officer Corps	
9		Rear Admiral; Kelly E. Taggart (1932–2014)	1981	1986	4–5 years		
10		Rear Admiral; Francis D. Moran (born 1935)	1986	1990	3–4 years		
11		Rear Admiral; Sigmund R. Petersen (1936–2024)	1990	1995	4–5 years		
12		Rear Admiral; William L. Stubblefield (born 1940)	1995	1999	3–4 years		
13		Rear Admiral; Evelyn J. Fields (born 1949)	1999	2003	3–4 years	The first woman and first African-American in the combined history of the Coast and Geodetic Survey Corps, ESSA Corps, and NOAA Corps to serve as director.	
14		Rear Admiral; Samuel P. De Bow Jr.	2003	2007	3–4 years		
15		Rear Admiral; Jonathan W. Bailey	1 October 2007	15 August 2012	5 years, 14 days		
16		Rear Admiral; Michael S. Devany	15 August 2012	1 January 2014	1 year, 139 days	Promoted to vice admiral on 2 January 2014, only the second officer to achieve that rank in the combined history of the Coast and Geodetic Survey Corps, ESSA Corps, and NOAA Corps, and the first to do so since Vice Admiral Karo in 1965. After a tour as Director, became Deputy Under Secretary for Operations, NOAA.	
17		Rear Admiral; David A. Score	2 January 2014	6 September 2017	3 years, 247 days		
18		Rear Admiral; Michael J. Silah	6 September 2017	1 April 2021	3 years, 207 days		
19		Rear Admiral; Nancy A. Hann (born 1973)	16 November 2021	14 July 2024	2 years, 259 days	After a tour as Director, promoted to vice admiral on 15 July 2024 and became Deputy Under Secretary for Operations, NOAA. First woman and third person to achieve that rank in the combined history of the Coast and Geodetic Survey Corps, ESSA Corps, and NOAA Corps.	
20		Rear Admiral; Chad M. Cary	1 August 2024	Incumbent	2 years, 94 days		

== Commissioned officers ==
=== Ranks and insignia ===
The NOAA Corps uses the same naval commissioned officer ranks as the United States Navy, United States Coast Guard, and United States Public Health Service Commissioned Corps. While the grade of admiral has been established as a rank in the NOAA Corps, the rank has not been authorized for use by the United States Congress. Current NOAA Corps ranks rise from ensign to vice admiral, pay grades O-1 through O-9, respectively, although the rank of vice admiral has been used only rarely in the history of the NOAA Corps and its predecessors.

Unless already on active duty as a commissioned officer in any of the other U.S. uniformed services and transferring their commission from that service, new NOAA Corps officers are appointed via direct commission and must complete a 19-week basic officer training class (BOTC) at the United States Coast Guard Officer Candidate School at the United States Coast Guard Academy before entering active duty.

NOAA Corps officers receive the same pay as other members of the U.S. uniformed services. They cannot hold a dual commission with another U.S. uniformed service, but inter-service transfers sometimes are permitted from other services via 10 U.S.C. § 716.

Unlike their United States Armed Forces counterparts, NOAA Corps officers do not require their rank appointments and promotions to be confirmed by the United States Senate, and only require approval from the president.

Uniformed services pay grade	Special grade	O-10	O-9	O-8	O-7	O-6	O-5	O-4	O-3	O-2	O-1
NOAA
NOAA			Vice admiral	Rear admiral	Rear admiral (lower half)	Captain	Commander	Lieutenant commander	Lieutenant	Lieutenant (junior grade)	Ensign
Abbreviation			VADM	RADM	RDML	CAPT	CDR	LCDR	LT	LTJG	ENS
NATO code	OF-10	OF-9	OF-8	OF-7	OF-6	OF-5	OF-4	OF-3	OF-2	OF-1

=== Rank flags ===
NOAA Corps flag officers are authorized the use of rank flags.

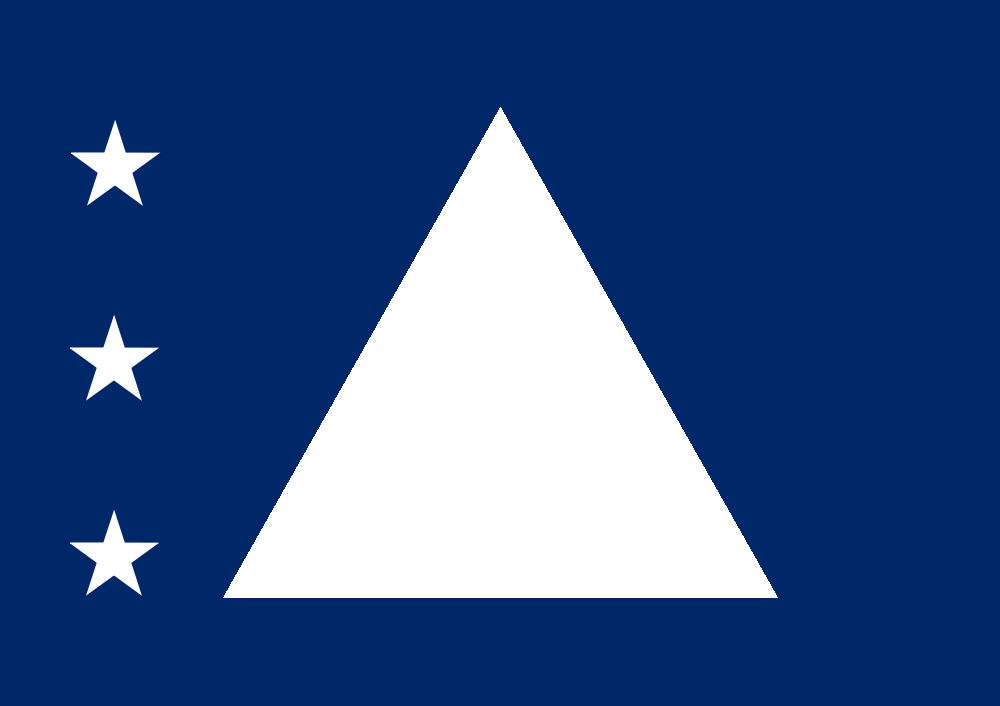
Flag of a NOAA Corps
vice admiral

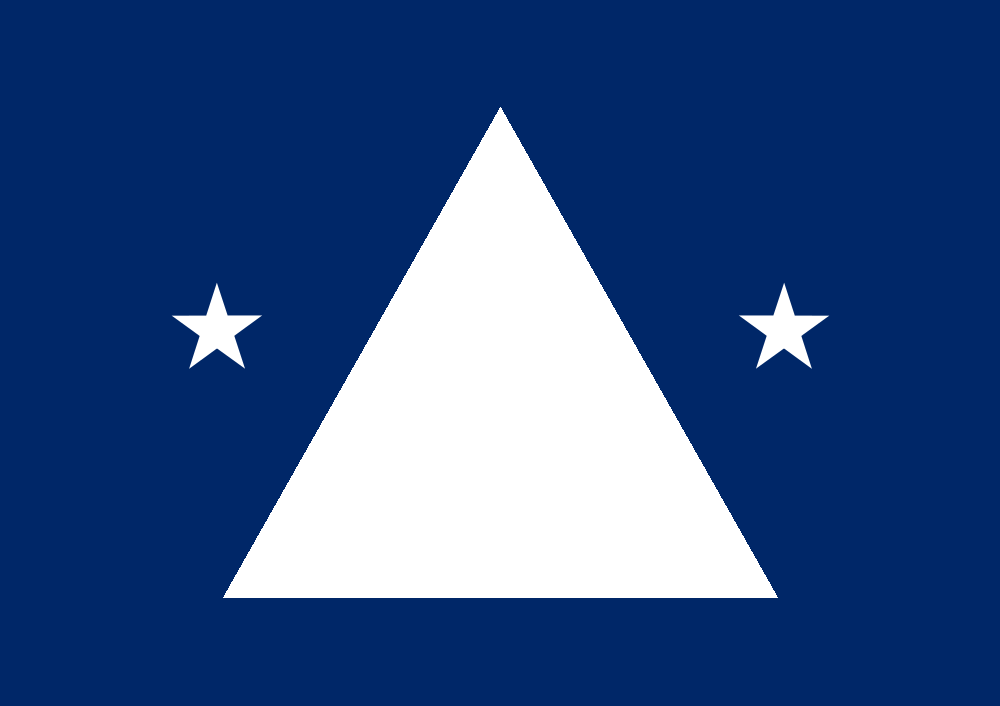
Flag of a NOAA Corps
rear admiral

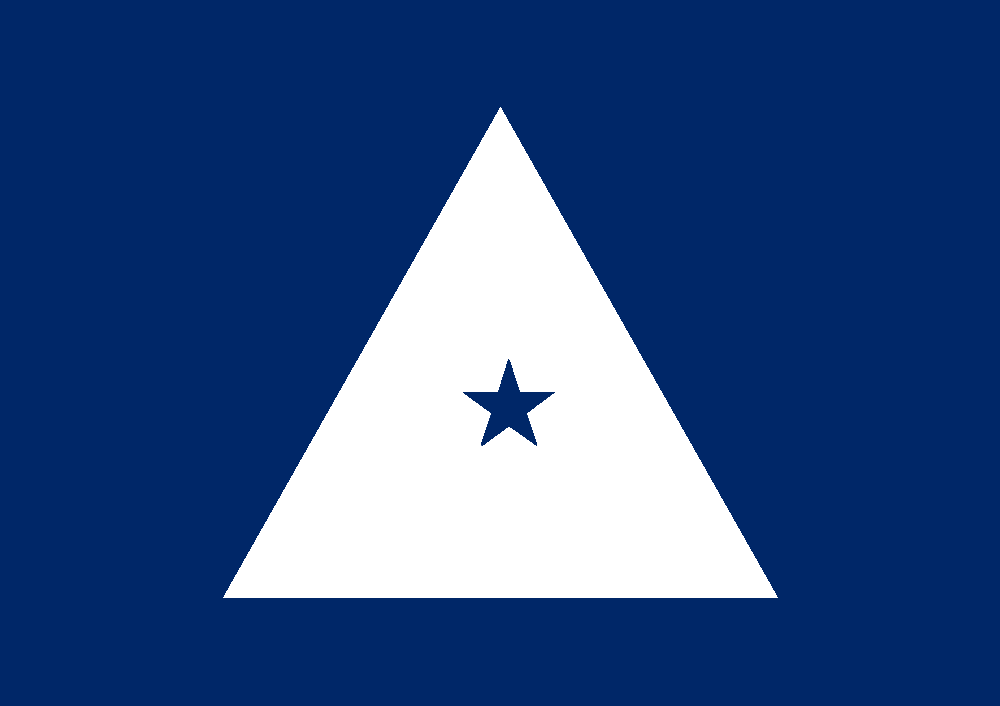
Flag of a NOAA Corps
rear admiral (lower half)

=== Militarization ===
NOAA Corps officers can be militarized by the President of the United States under the provisions of 33 U.S.C. § 3061, which states:

The President may, whenever in the judgment of the President a sufficient national emergency exists, transfer to the service and jurisdiction of a military department such vessels, equipment, stations, and officers of the Administration as the President considers to be in the best interest of the country. An officer of the Administration transferred under this section, shall, while under the jurisdiction of a military department, have proper military status and shall be subject to the laws, regulations, and orders for the government of the Army, Navy, or Air Force, as the case may be, insofar as the same may be applicable to persons whose retention permanently in the military service of the United States is not contemplated by law.

== Uniforms ==
For formal service uniforms, the NOAA Corps wears the same Service Dress Blues and Service Dress Whites as the U.S. Navy, but with NOAA Corps insignia in place of U.S. Navy insignia. For daily work uniforms, the NOAA Corps wears the same Operational Dress Uniform (ODU) as the U.S. Coast Guard, but with NOAA Corps insignia in place of U.S. Coast Guard insignia.

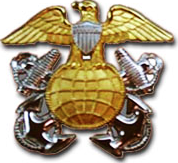
NOAA Corps Combination Cap Device

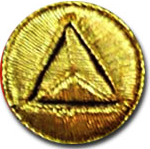
NOAA Corps Device

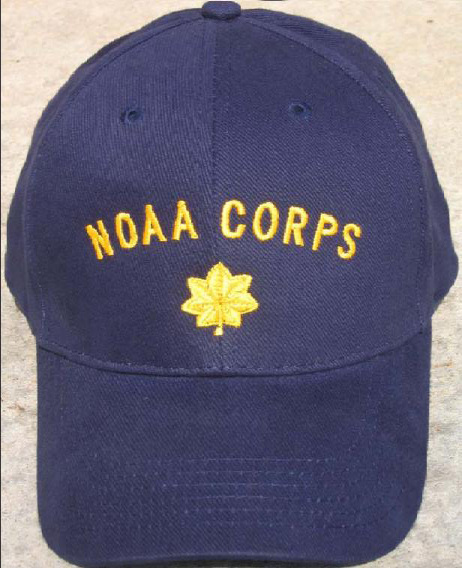
An ODU uniform ball cap, with lieutenant commander rank insignia

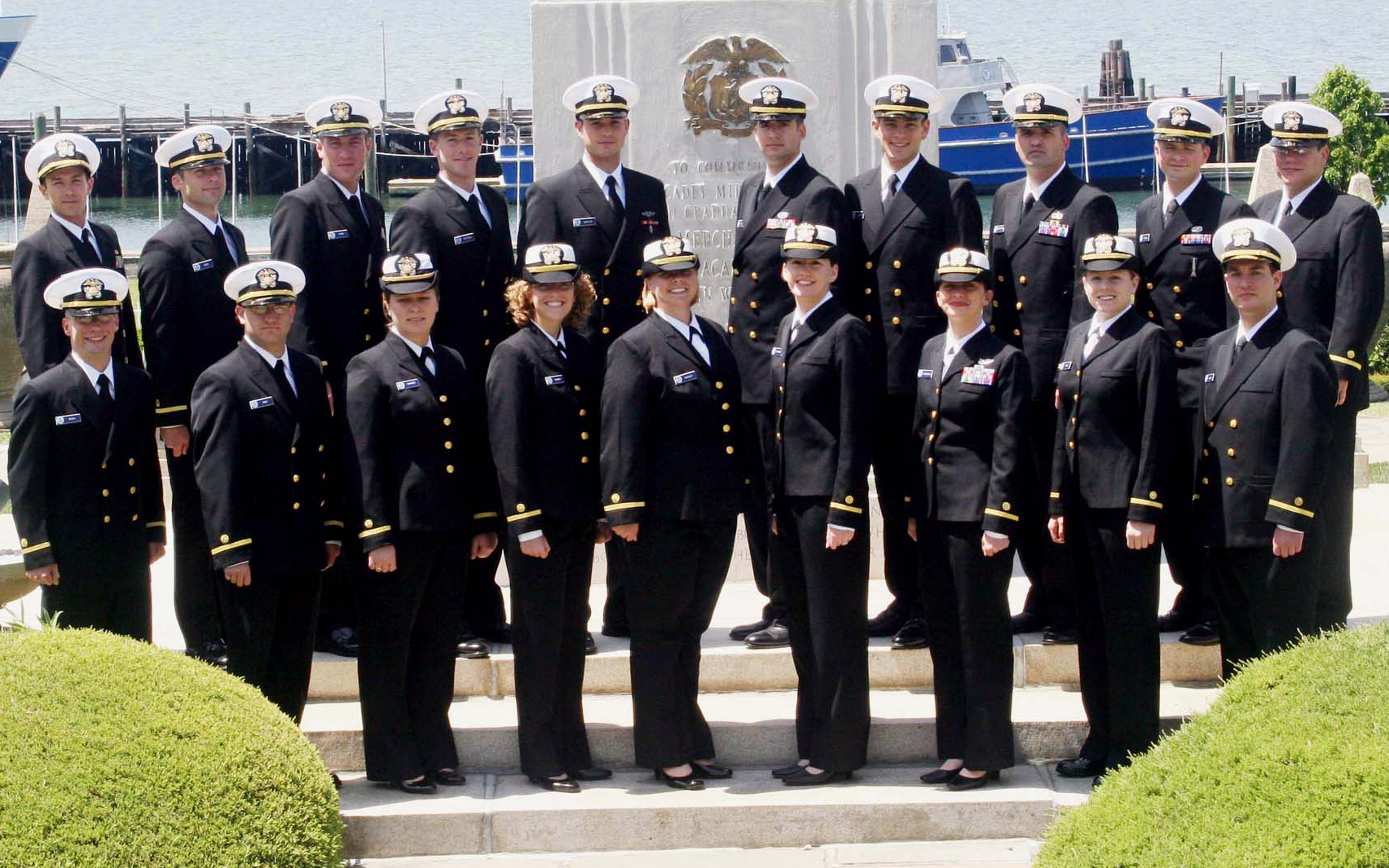
NOAA Corps officers wearing service dress blues

== Flag ==
NOAA Commissioned Officer Corps flag

Although the U.S. Coast and Geodetic Survey and ESSA had their own flags, neither the Coast and Geodetic Survey Corps nor the ESSA Corps did. The NOAA Corps adopted its flag on 7 March 2002, the last of the then-seven uniformed services of the United States to have its own distinctive flag. The flag is displayed in accordance with the customs and traditions of the uniformed services of the United States.

The flag has a navy blue background. Centered on the background is a white circle inscribed with "NOAA COMMISSIONED CORPS" and "1917", the latter referring to the year of the founding of the NOAA Corps's original predecessor, the U.S. Coast and Geodetic Survey Corps. A red triangle symbolizing the discipline of triangulation used in hydrographic surveying is centered within the white circle; a similar triangle was part of the U.S. Coast and Geodetic Survey and ESSA flags. The emblem of the NOAA Commissioned Corps lies within the red triangle.

== Official song ==
In 1988, the NOAA Corps adopted a march, "Forward with NOAA", as its first official service song. In 2017 it adopted a sea chanty, "Into the Oceans and the Air", as its new official service song.

== Notable officers ==
- Alexander Dallas Bache - Superintendent of USC&GS, began coastal study of the Pacific Coast and helped turn the bureau into a modern, scientific agency.
- Commander Pamela Chelgren - first female commissioned officer in the NOAA Corps in 1972.
- Rear Admiral Evelyn J. Fields - first female flag officer, first female two-star rear admiral and first female to lead the NOAA Corps in 1999.
- Vice Admiral Nancy Hann - first female three-star admiral in the NOAA Corps in 2024.
- Rear Admiral (lower half) Freddie Jefferies - first African American to be a flag officer in the NOAA corps in 1991.
- Rear Admiral (lower half) Anita L. Lopez - first female one-star rear admiral (as RADM Fields was promoted from captain to two-stars directly).
- Rear Admiral Charles D. Sigsbee - U.S. Navy officer who commanded the USC&GS steamer Blake made first modern maps of the sea floor.

== See also ==
- National Oceanic and Atmospheric Administration Fisheries Office of Law Enforcement
- NOAA ships and aircraft
