= Evelyn J. Fields =

Former NOAA Corps Director

Evelyn Fields
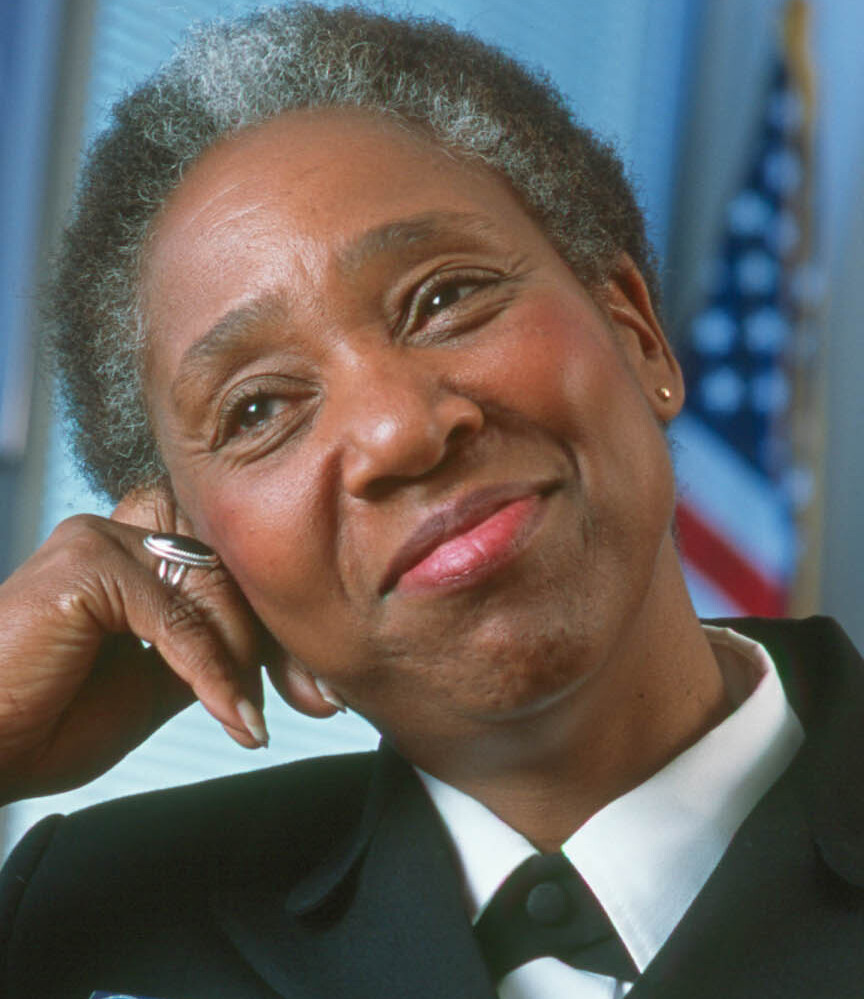
- Fields
- Born: Evelyn Juanita Fields; January 29, 1949 (age 77); Norfolk, Virginia, U.S.
- Education: Norfolk State University (BS)
- Military career
- Allegiance: United States
- Branch: NOAA
- Service years: 1972–2003
- Rank: Rear admiral
- Unit: NOAA Commissioned Officer Corps
- Commands: Director of the Office of the NOAA Corps Operations; Director of the NOAA Commissioned Officer Corps (1999–2003)
- Awards: Department of Commerce Gold Medal

Fields reflects on her career in 2020

Evelyn J. Fields (born 1949) is a rear admiral, retired, of the National Oceanic and Atmospheric Administration Commissioned Officer Corps, who served as the director of the Commissioned Officer Corps and director of NOAA's Office of Marine and Aviation Operations, from 1999 until her retirement in 2003. Fields was the first woman, and first African American to head the NOAA Corps.

Earlier in her career, in 1989, Fields was given command of the research vessel, NOAAS McArthur, thus becoming the first woman and first African American to command a NOAA ship, and the first woman to command a ship in the United States uniformed services for an extended assignment.

== Early life and education ==
Evelyn Juanita Fields was born in Norfolk, Virginia on 29 January 1949, the oldest of five children (two girls and three boys). Her father was a civilian employee at the Naval Shipyard in Norfolk, and her mother was a teacher. She attended Liberty Park Elementary School, crediting her fourth and fifth grade teacher with sparking her interest in math and science. She then attended Booker T. Washington High School. Fields graduated from Norfolk State University in 1971 with a BS degree in mathematics, starting out in her freshman year as one of only four or five female math majors.

== Career ==
=== National Oceanic and Atmospheric Administration ===
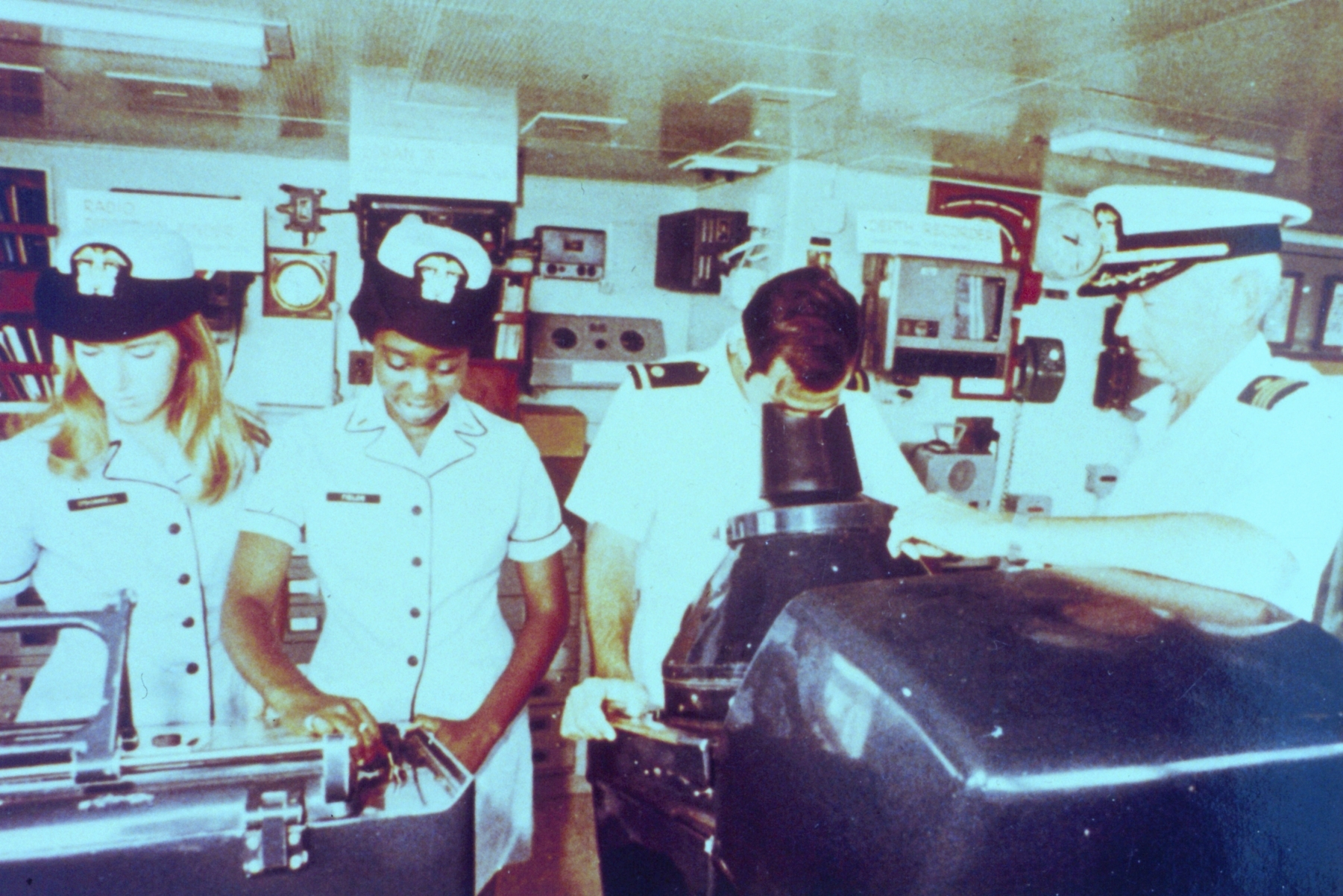
Ensigns Karen O'Donnell and Evelyn Fields, unidentified ensign at radar, and Commander Ronald Buffington on the bridge of the NOAA Ship MT MITCHELL. Atlantic Ocean, East Coast of USA (1974).

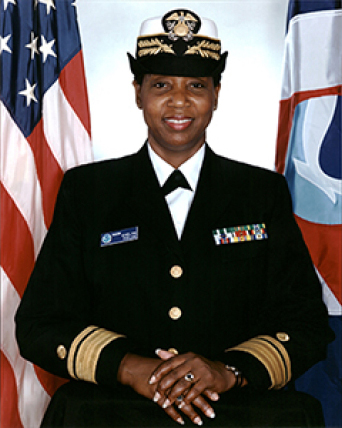
Rear Admiral Evelyn Fields

Fields began her career with NOAA in 1972 as a civilian cartographer at NOAA's Atlantic Marine Center in Norfolk, Virginia. At that time, women were not allowed on NOAA's ships, but she did participate in shore-based research parties for data collection. She worked in this position less than a year, when NOAA Corps Director Rear Admiral Harley Nygren started recruiting women for the first time as commissioned officers. Fields was commissioned an ensign in the NOAA Corps in 1973 and was the first African-American woman to join the Corps. She was then selected for and attended the Armed Forces Staff College to study hydrography.

Fields served as an operations officer on the NOAA Ships Mount Mitchell (S 222) and Peirce (S 328) and executive officer of the survey vessel NOAA Ship Rainier (S 221). In January 1989, Fields was chosen by NOAA's Selection Board to serve as commanding officer of the NOAA ship McArthur (S330), an oceanographic and fisheries research vessel based in Seattle, Washington. Fields was the first female officer to command a NOAA ship and the first African-American. She was also the first woman to command a ship for an extended assignment (18 months) within all of the nation's uniformed services.

In July 1990, Fields was selected to take part in the U.S. Department of Commerce Science and Technology Fellowship Program, where she spent 10 months in a policy-making office in the federal government.

Field's hydrographic knowledge and skills contributed to preparing nautical charts for the U.S. Navy to use during the 1991 Gulf War.

In 1995, Fields became Director of the Commissioned Personnel Center (CPC), which is responsible for all aspects of a uniformed service personnel system in support of the NOAA Corps officers. Now at the rank of captain, she entered this new leadership role as the CPC was in the midst of a government-wide Presidential initiative to reduce the size of government, being told to reduce the office staff by half from around 25 to 12 and the NOAA Corps from 401 to 299. Eight months into her role, the Administration announced a plan to disestablish the NOAA Corps, converting the work of the NOAA Corp to civilian jobs.

In 1997, Fields became the acting deputy director of NOAA's National Ocean Service, where she improved and streamlined the nautical chart making process. With new technology, Fields doubled the rate of chart production and cut the time to update a nautical chart from 47 weeks to 4 weeks.

She was nominated as director of the NOAA Commissioned Corps and NOAA Corps Operations by U.S. President Bill Clinton on January 19, 1999, confirmed by the Senate on May 6, 1999, and promoted from captain to rear admiral, upper half. Fields was the first woman, and first African American, to hold this position. While serving in the roles as both director of the NOAA Corps and the Office of Marine and Aviation Operations, she was responsible for NOAA's fleet of 15 research vessels, 14 aircraft, and over 700 commissioned NOAA Corp officers and civilians.

During her twenty-five years of commissioned service, RADM Fields has served in a variety of billets, both staff and operational. All but two of her assignments on land and at sea were within the National Ocean Service and related to nautical charting. Deployments have included both the Atlantic and Pacific Oceans, specifically the Gulf of Mexico, Caribbean, and Alaskan waters. Her sea experience covers hydrographic survey operations, fisheries research, and oceanographic research. She was the second U.S. Exchange Hydrographer with the Canadian Hydrographic Service, spending three months on Canadian ships working with field parties in Newfoundland and the Canadian Arctic. After the exchange program, she was responsible for reviewing, critiquing, and determining whether the hydrographic survey data submitted by Atlantic Marine Center field units was complete and adequate for final acceptance into the processing system.

Afterward, as assignment coordinator for the Office of NOAA Corps Operations, she worked with all program areas of NOAA, providing sound advice to both programs and officers regarding officer assignments. Rear Admiral Fields retired 1 December 2003.

== Awards and honors ==
- 1996 - Named one of the top 50 minority women in science and engineering by the National Technical Association
- 1999 – Congressional Black Caucus's Ralph M. Metcalfe Health, Education and Science Award
- 1999 – Maryland Federation of Business and Professional Women's Clubs' Woman of the Year
- 2000 – Department of Commerce Gold Medal for Leadership, in recognition of her exceptional contributions to NOAA's mission
- 2000 - The Virginia State Legislature passed Senate Joint Resolution No. 15 commending Rear Admiral Evelyn J. Fields "on her exceptionally distinguished career with the NOAA Corps" and "as an expression of the General Assembly's admiration for her accomplishments and best wishes for continued success"

== Personal life ==
Fields is a member of Zeta Phi Beta sorority. Her hobbies are reading, aerobics and gardening.

== See also ==
- NOAA Corps

Military offices
| Preceded by William L. Stubblefield | Director of the NOAA Commissioned Officer Corps; 1999–2003 | Succeeded by Samuel De Bow |
