= NOAAS Peirce =

American survey ship

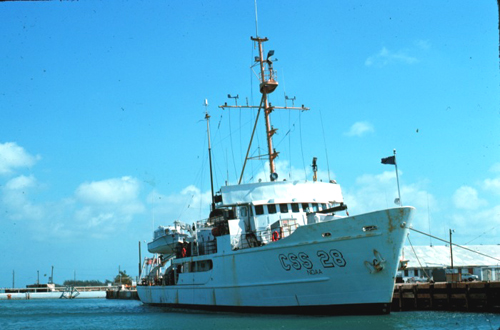
- USC&GS Peirce (CSS 28)

History

United States
- Name: USC&GS Peirce (CSS 28)
- Namesake: Charles Sanders Peirce (1839-1914), U.S. Coast Survey and U.S. Coast and Geodetic Survey employee (1859-1891), an intellectual, physical scientist, and philosopher
- Builder: Marietta Manufacturing Company, Point Pleasant, West Virginia
- Launched: October 1962
- Acquired: May 1963 (delivery)
- Commissioned: 6 May 1963
- Fate: Transferred to National Oceanic and Atmospheric Administration 3 October 1970

United States
- Name: NOAAS Peirce (S 328)
- Namesake: Previous name retained
- Acquired: Transferred from U.S. Coast and Geodetic Survey 3 October 1970
- Decommissioned: 1 May 1992
- Home port: Norfolk, Virginia
- Identification: Radio call sign WTEQ
- Fate: Donated to Intrepid Sea, Air & Space Museum 1992

United States
- Name: MV Elizabeth M. Fisher
- Namesake: Elizabeth M. Fisher, co-founder of the Fisher House Foundation and wife of Intrepid Sea, Air & Space Museum founder Zachary Fisher
- Owner: Intrepid Sea, Air & Space Museum
- Operator: Intrepid Sea, Air & Space Museum
- Port of registry: United States
- Acquired: Donated by National Oceanic and Atmospheric Administration 1992
- Home port: New York, New York
- Fate: Sold to private owner 1999
- Notes: Floating classroom and archaeological research ship

United States
- Name: MV Avedonia
- Owner: Private ownership
- Port of registry: United States
- Acquired: Sold by Intrepid Sea, Air & Space Museum 1999
- Home port: Dover, Delaware
- Identification: IMO number: 6407561
- Status: Active
- Notes: Private yacht

General characteristics (as survey ship)
- Class & type: Peirce-class survey ship
- Type: S1-MT-59a
- Tonnage: 696 gross register tons; 151 net tons; 206 deadweight tons
- Displacement: 907 tons
- Length: 49.7 m (163 ft)
- Beam: 10.1 m (33 ft)
- Draft: 3.4 m (11 ft) (maximum); 3.7 m (12 ft) (with IDSSS dome)
- Propulsion: Two geared 800-bhp (597-kW) General Motors diesel engines, two shafts, 4,300 U.S. gallons (16,277 liters fuel
- Speed: 12.0 knots
- Range: 5,700 nm
- Endurance: 20 days
- Crew: 33 (8 officers, 25 other crew, 2 scientists) plus up to 6 temporarily embarked personnel

NOAAS Peirce (S 328) was an American survey ship that was in commission in the National Oceanic and Atmospheric Administration (NOAA) from 1970 to 1992. Previously, she had been in commission in the United States Coast and Geodetic Survey from 1963 to 1970 as USC&GS Peirce (CSS 28).

After her NOAA decommissioning, she was donated to the Intrepid Sea, Air & Space Museum for use as the floating classroom and archaeological research ship MV Elizabeth M. Foster. She was sold for private use in 1999 and in 2001 became the yacht MV Avedonia.

== Construction and commissioning ==
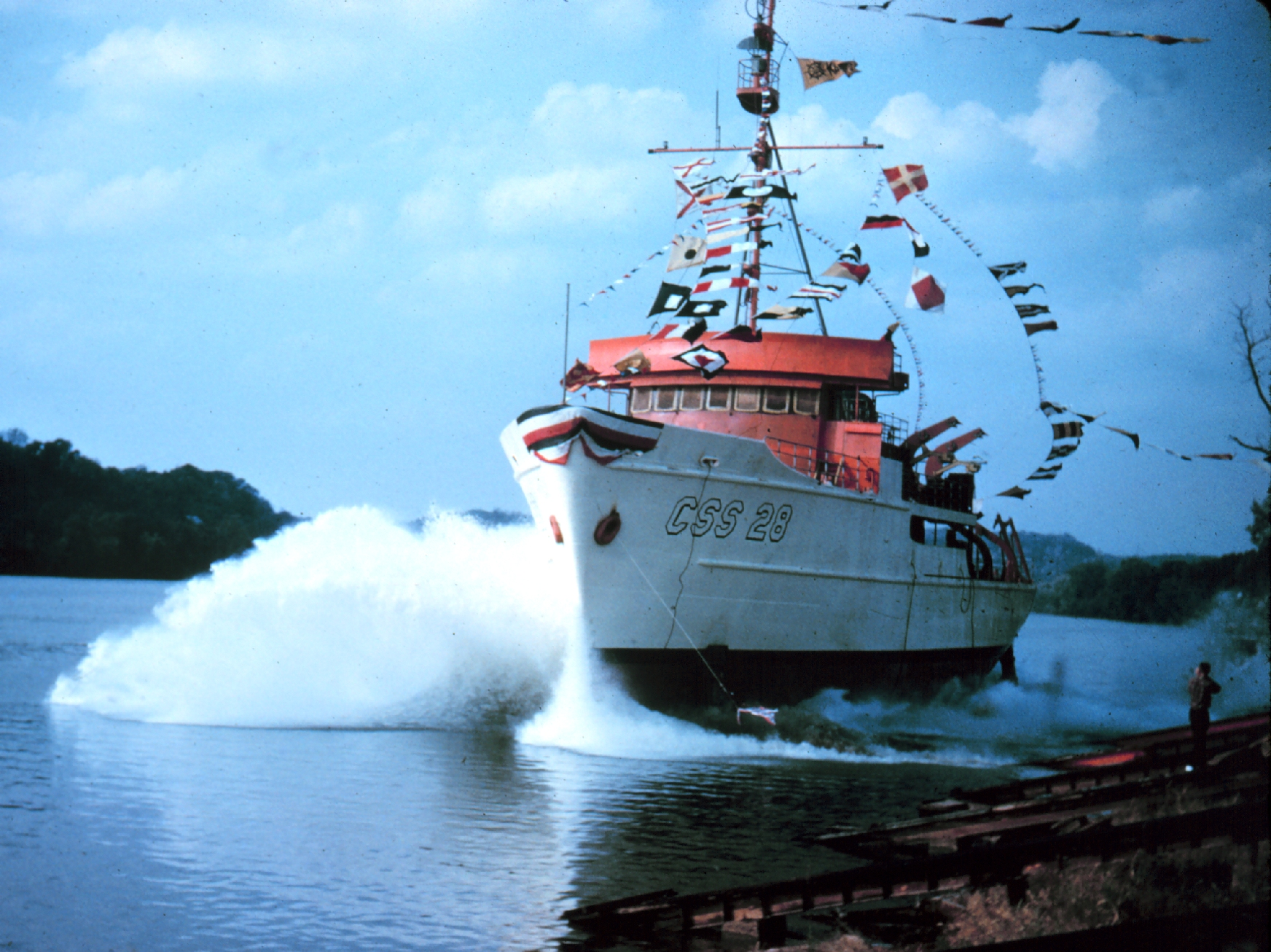
USC&GS Peirce (CSS 28) is launched by the Marietta Manufacturing Company at Point Pleasant, West Virginia, in October 1962.

Peirce was built a cost of $2,300,000 (USD) as a "coastal survey ship" (CSS) for the U.S. Coast and Geodetic Survey by the Marietta Manufacturing Company at Point Pleasant, West Virginia. She was launched in October 1962 and delivered in May 1963. The Coast and Geodetic Survey commissioned her on 6 May 1963 at the Alabama State Docks in Mobile, Alabama, as USC&GS Peirce (CSS 28), the first and only Coast and Geodetic Survey ship of the name. When the Coast and Geodetic Survey and other United States Government agencies merged to form NOAA on 3 October 1970, Peirce became a part of the NOAA fleet as NOAAS Peirce (S 328), thus far the only NOAA ship to bear the name.

== Capabilities ==
Peirce had a two-drum oceanographic winch with a maximum pull of 1,500 pounds (680 kg). The upper drum had 10,000 feet (3,000 meters) of 0.3-inch (7.62-mm) electrical cable, while the lower drum had 15,000 feet (4,600 meters) of 5/16-inch (7.9-mm) cable. She had a 27-foot (8.2-meter) telescoping boom with a lifting capacity of 2,500 pounds (1,100 kg) and a 27-foot (8.2-meter) articulating boom with a lifting capacity of 2,768 pounds (1,256 kg), as well as a movable A-frame.

For acoustic hydrography and bathymetry, the ship had a deep-water echosounder, a shallow-water echosounder-lOOKhz, and a hydrographic survey sounder. To process data, she had the National Ocean Service's Hydrochart system, which employed a PDP/8E computer to acquire and process hydrographic data in real time, generate a real-time position-corrected plot of sounding data, provide steering commands to the helmsman, and generate a punched paper tape for shore-based processing of sounding dara.

Peirce had an ice-strengthened steel hull.

Peirce carried two 29-foot (8.8-meter) aluminum-hulled diesel-powered Jensen survey launches, each equipped with the same Hydrochart system as aboard Peirce. For utility and rescue purposes, she also carried two open boats with gasoline-powered outboard motors, a 16-foot (4.9-meter) Boston Whaler fiberglass-hulled boat and 17-foot (5.2-meter) Monark aluminum-hulled boat.

== Operational career ==
From her home port at Norfolk, Virginia, Peirce conducted hydrographic and bathymetric surveys involving nautical charting and ocean mapping, primarily along the United States East Coast and United States Gulf Coast and off territories of the United States in the Caribbean.

NOAA decommissioned Peirce on 1 May 1992.

== Floating classroom and yacht ==
In 1992, Peirce was donated to the Intrepid Sea, Air & Space Museum in New York City. The museum acquired her for use as a floating classroom and archaeological research ship and renamed her MV Elizabeth M. Fisher in 1993. In 1999 the museum sold her for private use, and in 2000 she returned to the name MV Peirce. By 2001 she was operating as the private yacht MV Avedonia.

== See also ==
- NOAA ships and aircraft
