= Former fleet of the United States Fish and Wildlife Service =

Fish fleet from 1940 to 1970

From 1940 to 1970, the United States Fish and Wildlife Service operated a fleet of seagoing vessels. The fleet included fisheries science research ships, fishery patrol vessels, and cargo liners.

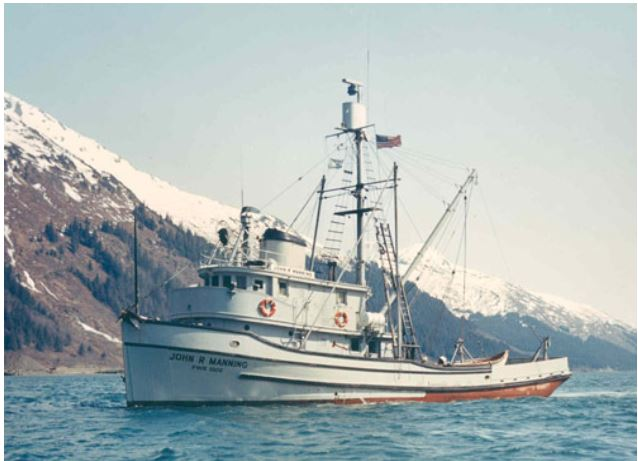
US FWS John R. Manning

The United States Fish Commission operated a small fleet of research ships and fish-culture vessels. Its successor agency, the Bureau of Fisheries, inherited these in 1903, and then greatly expanded its fleet of seagoing vessels, including both patrol vessels for fishery enforcement in the Territory of Alaska and a cargo liner — known as the "Pribilof tender" — to provide transportation for passengers and haul cargo to, from, and between the Pribilof Islands. In the 1930s, the Bureau of Biological Survey operated a vessel of its own, Brown Bear. Upon its creation in 1940, the FWS inherited the BOF's fleet and Brown Bear.

By 1940, no fisheries research vessels remained in commission, the BOF having decommissioned the last one, USFS Albatross II, in 1932; only in the late 1940s did the FWS begin to commission new research ships. Although between 1871 and 1940 the Fish Commission and BOF had never had more than three fisheries research ships in commission at the same time — and had three in commission simultaneously only in two years out of their entire combined history — by March 1950, the FWS fleet included 11 seagoing fisheries research and exploratory fishing vessels either in service or under construction, and its fishery enforcement force in the Territory of Alaska included 29 patrol vessels and about 100 speedboats, as well as 20 airplanes. In the 1956 reorganization that created the USFWS, the Bureau of Commercial Fisheries (BCF) assumed the responsibility within the USFWS for the operation of the seagoing vessels of the fleet.

Both before and after the FWS became the USFWS in 1956, ships of its fleet used the prefix "US FWS" while in commission. The BOF usually named its ships after aquatic birds and ships the FWS inherited from the BOF in 1940 retained those names in FWS service. However, the FWS/USFWS thereafter usually named vessels it acquired after people who were notable in the history of fisheries and fisheries science.

== List of ships ==
- US FWS Albatross III (research vessel, 1948–1959)
- US FWS Albatross IV (research vessel, USFWS 1963–1970, then NOAA 1970–2008)
- US FWS Auklet (patrol vessel, BOF 1917–1940, then FWS 1940–1950)
- US FWS Blue Wing (patrol vessel, BOF 1924–1940, then FWS 1940–1950s)
- US FWS Brant (patrol vessel, BOF 1926–1940, then FWS 1940–1953)
- US FWS Brown Bear (research vessel, Bureau of Biological Survey 1934–1940, then FWS 1940–1942, USFWS 1965–1970, NMFS 1970–1972)
- US FWS Charles H. Gilbert (research vessel, FWS/USFWS 1952–1970, then NOAA 1970–1973)
- US FWS Crane (patrol vessel, BOF 1928–1940, then FWS/USFWS 1940–1960)
- US FWS David Starr Jordan (research vessel, USFWS 1966–1970, then NOAA 1970–2010)
- US FWS Delaware II (research vessel, USFWS 1968–1970, then NOAA 1970–2012)
- US FWS Dennis Winn (Pribilof tender and cargo liner, 1948–1960)
- US FWS Eider (Pribilof tender and patrol vessel, BOF 1919–1940, then FWS 1940–1942 and 1946–late 1940s)
- US FWS George B. Kelez (research vessel 1962–1970, then NOAA 1970–1980)
- US FWS Henry O'Malley (research vessel 1949–1951)
- US FWS Hugh M. Smith (research vessel 1949–1959)
- US FWS John N. Cobb (research vessel FWS/USFWS 1950–1970, then NOAA 1970–2008)
- US FWS John R. Manning (research vessel 1950–1969)
- US FWS Kittiwake (patrol vessel, BOF 1919–1940, then FWS 1940–late 1940s)
- US FWS Merganser (patrol vessel, BOF 1919–1940, then FWS 1940–ca. 1942–1943)
- US FWS Miller Freeman (research vessel USFWS 1967–1970, then NOAA 1975–2013)
- US FWS Murre (patrol vessel, BOF 1917–1940, then FWS 1940–1942)
- US FWS Murre II (research vessel FWS/USFWS 1949–1970, then NOAA 1970–1989)
- US FWS Oregon (research vessel FWS/USFWS 1956–1970, then NOAA 1970–1980)
- US FWS Pelican (research and patrol vessel, BOF 1930–1940, then FWS/USFWS 1940–1958, NMFS ca. 1970/1971 to 1972)
- US FWS Penguin (Pribilof tender, BOF 1930–1940, then FWS 1940–1950)
- US FWS Penguin II (Pribilof tender, 1950–1963)
- US FWS Pribilof (Pribilof tender USFWS 1963–1970, then NMFS 1970–1975)
- US FWS Scoter (patrol vessel, BOF 1922–1940, then FWS 1940–1949)
- US FWS Teal (patrol vessel, BOF 1928–1940, then FWS/USFWS 1940–1960)
- US FWS Townsend Cromwell (research vessel 1964–1975, then NOAA 1975–2002)
- US FWS Widgeon (patrol vessel, BOF 1919–1940, then FWS 1940–ca. 1944–1945)

== Transformation to National Marine Fisheries Service ==
The USFWS continued fishery enforcement in Alaska until after Alaska became a state in January 1959, but by 1960 had turned over enforcement responsibilities and some of the associated vessels to the Government of Alaska as the latter assumed the responsibility for fishery enforcement in its waters. The USFWS continued to operate fisheries research ships and the Pribilof tender until the BCF's seagoing fleet was transferred to the National Marine Fisheries Service (NMFS), an element of NOAA, upon the creation of NOAA on October 3, 1970. Although the NMFS continued to operate the Pribilof tender until 1975, the rest of the ships were transferred from the NMFS to a unified NOAA fleet during 1972 and 1973. The modern NOAA fleet therefore traces its ancestry in part to the USFWS fleet operated by the BCF.
