= NOAAS Albatross IV =

U.S. fisheries research vessel

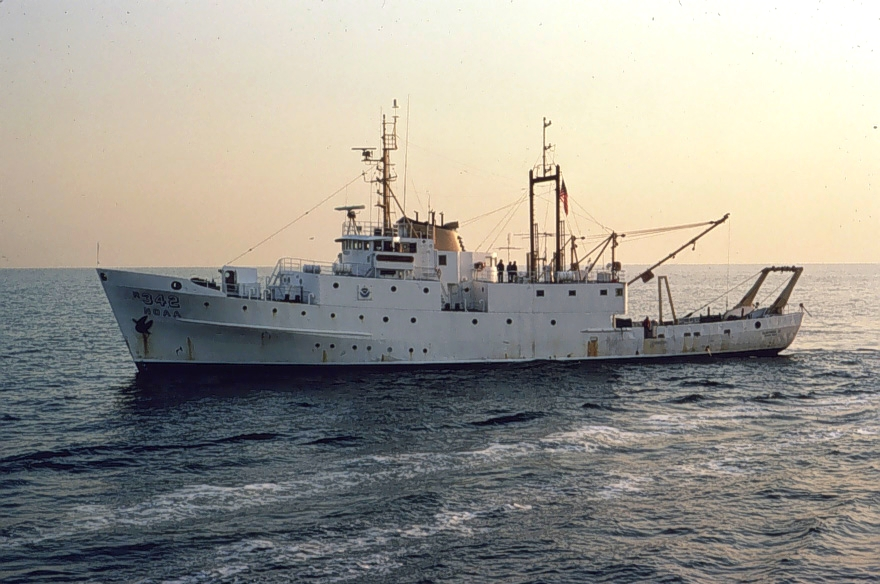
- NOAAS Albatross IV (R 342) in September 1985.

History

Bureau of Commercial Fisheries
- Name: BCF Albatross IV
- Namesake: USFC Albatross, a famed U.S. Fish Commission vessel in commission 1882–1898, 1898–1917, and 1919–1921; USFS Albatross II, a U.S. Bureau of Fisheries vessel in commission 1926–1932, and US FWS Albatross III, a U.S. Fish and Wildlife Service vessel in commission 1948–1959
- Builder: Southern Shipbuilding Company, Slidell, Louisiana
- Launched: April 1962
- Commissioned: 9 May 1963
- Fate: Transferred to National Oceanic and Atmospheric Administration 3 October 1970

United States
- Name: NOAAS Albatross IV (R 342)
- Namesake: Previous name retained
- Acquired: Transferred from U.S. Fish and Wildlife Service Bureau of Commercial Fisheries 3 October 1970
- Decommissioned: 20 November 2008
- Identification: IMO number: 7338690; MMSI number: 345010073; Callsign: XCAC8
- Fate: Sold to Mexico

General characteristics
- Type: Fisheries research ship
- Tonnage: 931 gross register tons; 300 net register tons
- Displacement: 1,089 tons
- Length: 187 ft (57 m)
- Beam: 33 ft (10 m)
- Draft: 16 ft (4.9 m)
- Installed power: 1,130 brake horsepower (0.84 megawatt)
- Propulsion: Two Caterpillar diesel engines, 1 shaft, 150 tons fuel; 125-horsepower (0.09-megawatt) bow thruster
- Speed: 12 knots (sustained)
- Range: 4,300 nautical miles (8,000 km) at 12 knots (22 km/h)
- Endurance: 15 days
- Boats & landing craft carried: One launch
- Complement: 21 (4 NOAA Corps officers, 1 civilian officer, 3 licensed engineers, and 13 other crew members), plus up to 14 scientists
- Notes: Ice-strengthened hull; 450 kilowatts electrical power

NOAA Ship Albatross IV (R 342), originally BCF Albatross IV, was a fisheries research ship in commission in the United States Fish and Wildlife Service's Bureau of Commercial Fisheries from 1963 to 1970 and in the National Oceanic and Atmospheric Administration (NOAA) from 1970 to 2008.

== Construction and characteristics ==
Albatross IV was built at Southern Shipbuilding in Slidell, Louisiana. She was launched in April 1962.

The ice-strengthened hull of the ship was 187 feet (57 meters) long. The ship had a total of 38 bunk spaces. Between the crew and officers mess rooms, the ship could seat 21 for meals. She carried a complement of 21–4 NOAA Corps officers, 1 civilian officer, and 16 crew (including 3 licensed engineers—and in addition could accommodate up to 14 scientists.

Her deck equipment featured four winches, one boom crane, an A-frame, a J-frame, and a portable gantry. This equipment gave Albatross IV a lifting capacity of up to 10,000 pounds (4,500 kilograms) as well 20,000 feet (6,100 meters) of cable that can pull up to 16,000 pounds (7,300 kilograms). Each of the winches serves a specialized function ranging from trawling and dredging to hydrographic surveys.

In support of her primary mission of fishery and living marine resource research for the National Marine Fisheries Service (NMFS) division of NOAA, the ship had shallow- and deep-water echo sounders, a fishfinder, and an Acoustic Doppler Current Profiler (ADCP). Additional scientific equipment included a thermosalinograph and a fluorometer. She had 800 square feet (74 square meters) of laboratory space with specialty labs for plankton and oceanographic chemistry. A 16-foot (4.9 m) launch was available for utility or rescue operations.

== US government service ==
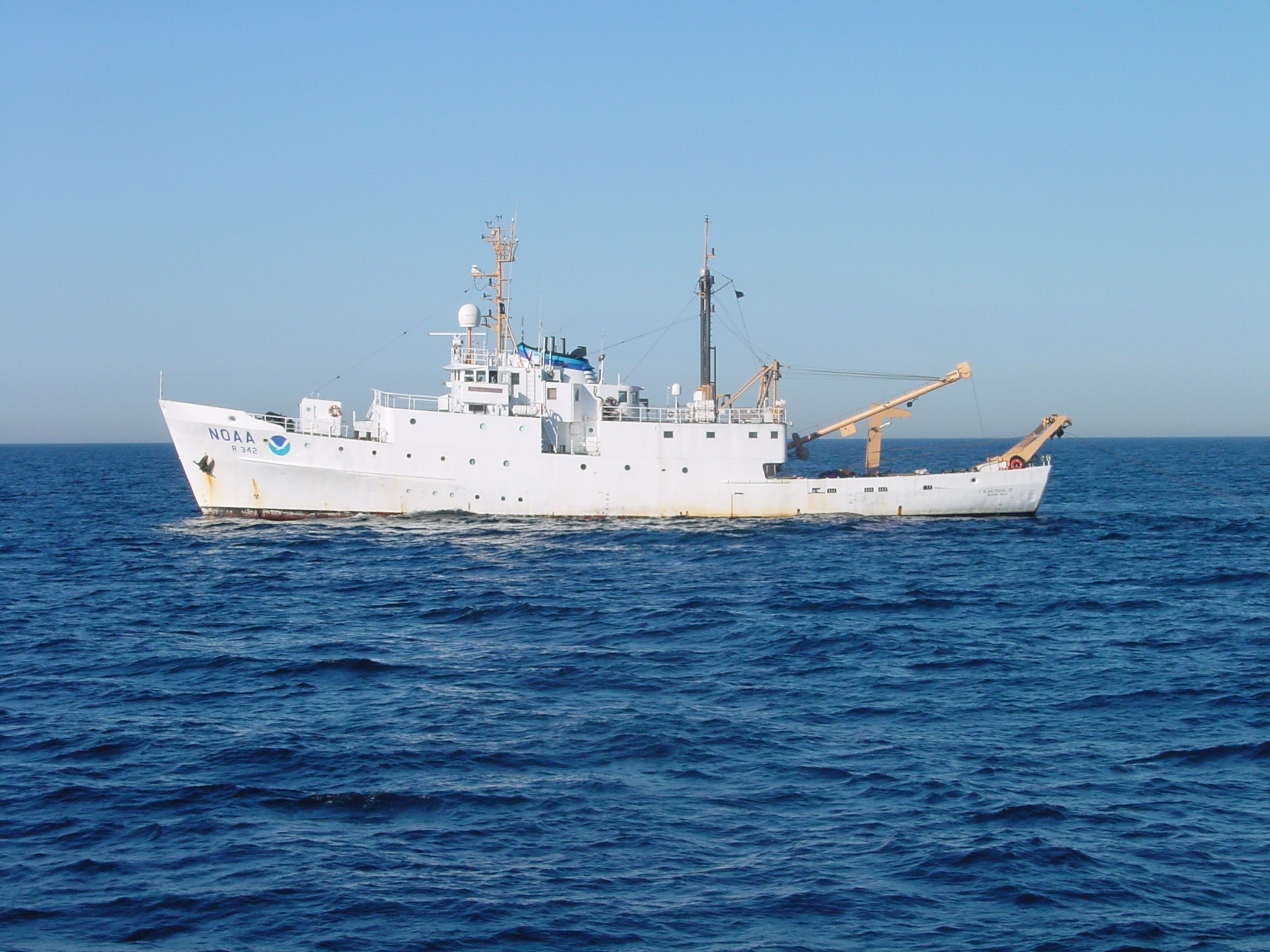
NOAAS Albatross IV (R 342) with her trawl out astern, photographed from NOAAS Delaware II (R 445) on 22 March 2005.

BCF Albatross IV was commissioned into service in the U.S. Fish and Wildlife Service's Bureau of Commercial Fisheries on May 9, 1963. When NOAA was established on 3 October 1970 and took over the Bureau's assets, she became part of the NOAA fleet, redesignated NOAAS Albatross IV (R 342).

Based at Woods Hole, Massachusetts, Albatross IV conducted fisheries and living marine resources research off the northeastern coast of the United States.

On May 12, 1986, shipyard workers were working in Albatross IV's marine sanitation device compartment when one of them accidentally set off the compartment's fixed carbon dioxide firefighting system. Although the other workers escaped, one man, Kelly Prince, passed out in the compartment. He would have suffocated, but three members of the ship's crew – NOAA Corps Lieutenant Dean Smehil, civilian third assistant engineer Daniel J. Parry, and the ship's executive officer – put on Scott air packs and crawled into the very tight compartment. In moments, Smehil and Parry dragged the unconscious Prince from the compartment to safety, saving his life. For their heroism, Smehil and Parry received the Department of Commerce Gold Medal in 1986.

Albatros IV was decommissioned on 20 November 2008.

== Later service ==
After withdrawal from NOAAS service, Albatross IV was sold to Maritech Engineering and Marine Project Services, an international firm based in Athens, Greece, and later transferred to its US affiliate, Marpro LLC, retaining the same name.

In 2013 Albatross IV was sold to the Autonomous University of Tamaulipas, Mexico, renamed UAT-1 CIDIPORT, and based at the Caribbean port of Tampico. She is operated by the Centro de Investigación y Desarrollo en Ingenieria Portuaria, Maritima y Costera (CIDIPORT)(tr. Center for Research and Development of Coastal, Ocean and Port Engineering) The ship was commissioned in May 2014 by Egidio Torre Cantú, governor of Tamaulipas State.

== See also ==
- NOAA ships and aircraft
