= NOAAS John N. Cobb =

U.S. fisheries research vessel

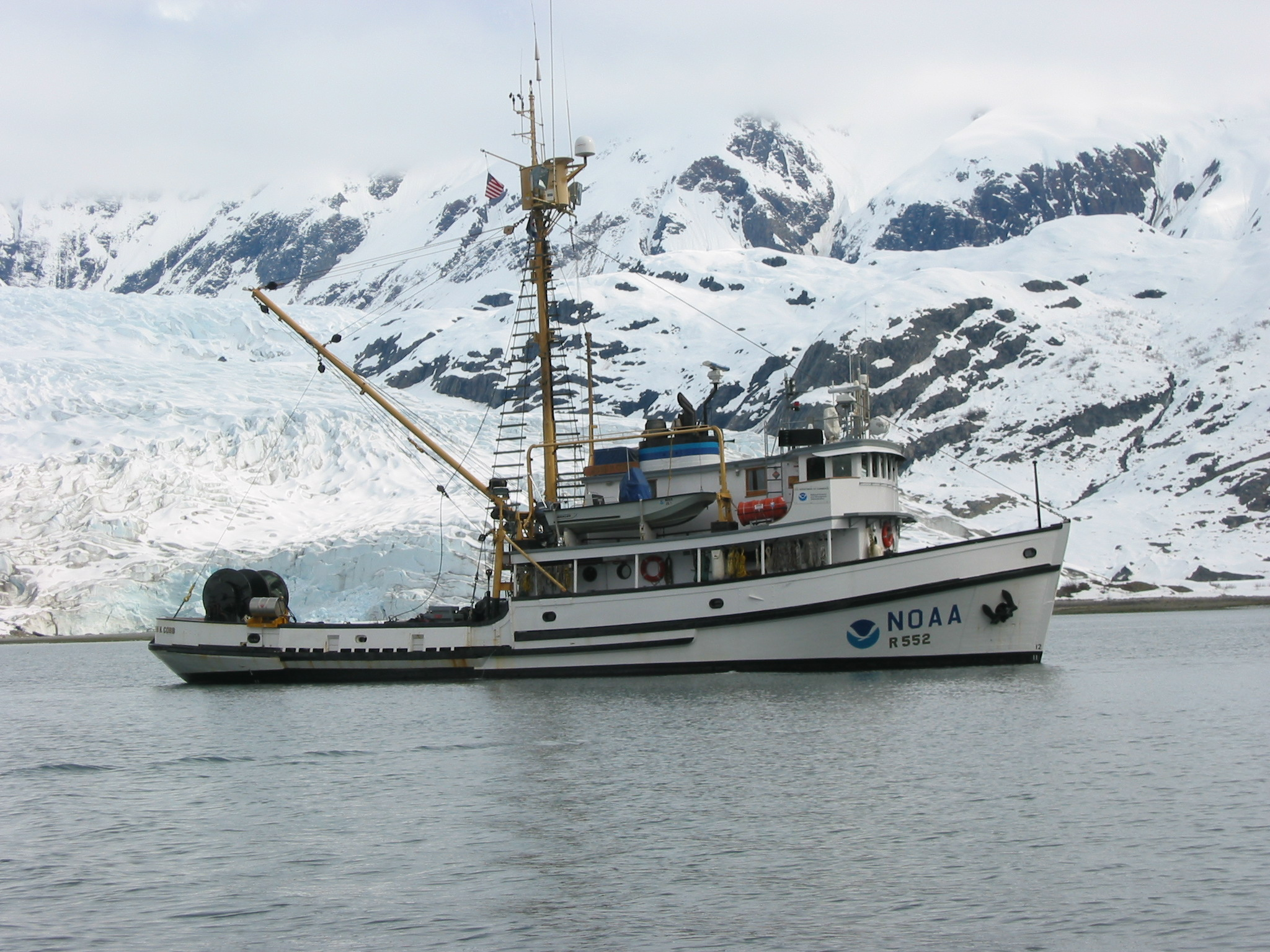
- NOAAS John N. Cobb (R 552) on 27 April 2004.

History

United States Fish and Wildlife Service
- Name: US FWS John N. Cobb
- Namesake: John N. Cobb (1868-1930), American fisheries researcher and first dean of the University of Washington College of Fisheries
- Builder: Western Boatbuilding Company, Tacoma, Washington
- Launched: 16 January 1950
- Commissioned: 18 February 1950
- Identification: FWS 1601
- Fate: Transferred to National Oceanic and Atmospheric Administration 3 October 1970
- Notes: Operated by Fish and Wildlife Service's Bureau of Commercial Fisheries 1956-1970

United States
- Name: NOAAS John N. Cobb
- Namesake: Previous name retained
- Acquired: Transferred from U.S. Fish and Wildlife Service 3 October 1970
- Decommissioned: 13 August 2008
- Home port: Seattle, Washington
- Identification: IMO number: 7738436; R 552
- Fate: Donated to Seattle Maritime Academy 2008; Preserved 2009; Sold to private owner 2015; Abandoned and seized 2016; Sold to private owner 2017
- Status: Extant as commercial fishing vessel 2018

General characteristics
- Type: Fisheries research ship
- Tonnage: 185 gross register tons (GRT); 78 net register tons (NRT)
- Displacement: 250 tons (full load)
- Length: 93 ft (28 m)
- Beam: 26 ft (7.9 m)
- Draft: 10 ft 10 in (3.30 m)
- Installed power: 325 bhp (242 kW)
- Propulsion: Fairbanks-Morse diesel engine, 1 shaft, 25 tons fuel
- Speed: 9.3 knots (17.2 km/h; 10.7 mph) (sustained)
- Range: 2,900 nmi (5,400 km; 3,300 mi) at 9.3 knots (17 km/h; 11 mph)
- Endurance: 13 days
- Boats & landing craft carried: 1 × fiberglass utility boat
- Complement: 10 (2 NOAA Corps officers, 2 licensed engineers, and 4 other crew members) plus up to 4 scientists (Note: Combat Fleets of the World 1990/1991, p. 917, claims her complement was 8 (4 civilian officers and 4 other crew members) plus up to 4 scientists.)
- Notes: 60 kilowatts electrical power
- John N. Cobb (fisheries research vessel)
- U.S. National Register of Historic Places
- NRHP reference No.: 09000047
- Added to NRHP: February 11, 2009

NOAA Ship John N. Cobb (R 552) was a National Oceanic and Atmospheric Administration research vessel in commission from 1970 to 2008. She was named for John Nathan Cobb and was the oldest commissioned ship in the NOAA fleet when she was decommissioned, having previously served in the United States Department of the Interior′s Fish and Wildlife Service from 1950 to 1956 and in the United States Fish and Wildlife Service′s Bureau of Commercial Fisheries from 1956 to 1970 as US FWS John N. Cobb (FWS 1601).

== Construction and commissioning ==
W. C. Nickum and Sons designed John N. Cobb based on a West Coast purse-seiner design. The Fish and Wildlife Service (FWS) funded her construction using US$150,000 ifrom the sale of the FWS fisheries research vessel Washington, and the Western Boatbuilding Company constructed her in Tacoma, Washington. She was launched on 16 January 1950 and commissioned as US FWS John N. Cobb (FWS 1601) on 18 February 1950.

== Technical characteristics ==
John N. Cobb had a wooden hull. As originally constructed, she was designed for exploratory fishing cruises and fishing gear research and development, with trawling, longlining, gillnetting, and oceanographic sampling capabilities. When commissioned in 1950, she had then-modern navigational equipment, including radar, a LORAN navigation system, depth finders, and an electro-mechanical steering system.

John N. Cobb had a total of 13 bunks, and her mess room could serve eight personnel at a time. During her NOAA service, she carried a complement of two NOAA Corps officers, two licensed engineers, and four other crew members, and could accommodate up to four scientists.

Her deck equipment featured three winches and one boom crane. This equipment gave John N. Cobb a lifting capacity of up to 4,800 pounds (2,200 kg) as well as 7,200 feet (2,200 m) of cable that could pull up to 14,000 pounds (6,400 kg).

During her NOAA years, in support of her primary mission of fishery and living marine resource research for the National Marine Fisheries Service (NMFS) division of NOAA, John N. Cobb was equipped with a shallow-water echo sounder, fishfinder, forward-looking sonar, and net sonde. She had a single laboratory of 150 square feet (14 m^{2}). She carried a 17-foot (5.2 m) fiberglass boat for utility and rescue purposes. She could conduct bottom trawls down to depths of over 300 fathoms (1,800 ft; 550 m).

== Operational history ==
=== Fish and Wildlife Service ===
Assigned Seattle, Washington, as her home port, John N. Cobb made her first cruise in March and April 1950, operating off Alaska in search of commercially useful populations of shellfish, especially shrimp. From June to September 1950, she operated in the Pacific Ocean off Alaska, Oregon, and Washington looking for commercially exploitable albacore populations. In August 1950, her crew discovered a seamount rising 9,600 feet (2,926 m) from the sea bottom to 132 feet (40.2 m) below the sea's surface 270 nautical miles (500 km; 310 mi) off the coast of Washington; the seamount later was named Cobb Seamount.

In 1953, John N. Cobb cruised off the Aleutian Islands, conducting a preliminary search for salmon populations and developing fishing techniques that would allow the successful use of gill nets in the open ocean. Later in 1953, she explored Prince William Sound off Alaska to assess the availability of herring there. In 1955, she tagged petrale sole in the Esteban Deep – a submarine canyon – in the Pacific Ocean off the west coast of Vancouver Island, British Columbia, Canada. That spring, working in conjunction with chartered halibut schooners, she began the first survey of salmon populations in the eastern North Pacific Ocean, and by the time she wrapped up this work in 1961, the general distribution of salmon in the North Pacific and Bering Sea was understood. Meanwhile, the Fish and Wildlife Service was renamed the United States Fish and Wildlife Service (USFWS) and reorganized in 1956, creating a new Bureau of Commercial Fisheries (BCF), and John N. Cobb became a part of the BCF fleet.

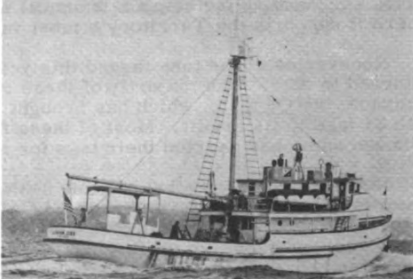
Starboard quarter view of US FWS John N. Cobb, from Commercial Fisheries Review, September 1957.

In 1959, John N. Cobb was supporting the USFWS's Exploratory Fishing and Gear Research (EF&GR) element in 1959 when it fielded its first scuba diving team, which operated from her. In August 1959, she took part in the Chariot Project with the United States Atomic Energy Commission to assess the feasibility of using nuclear explosives to excavate harbors or canals off the northwest coast of Alaska, but the project never came to fruition. Of her first 41 cruises in the 1950s, she focused on experimental fishing methods and equipment in 11, engaged in midwater trawling in seven, conducted bottom and shrimp trawling in two, and tested a fish pump device in two.

In 1960, John N. Cobb experimented with the use of a high-resolution echo sounder to locate dragging areas off Washington that contained commercial quantities of fish. In 1961, she worked with the U.S. Atomic Energy Commission to study deep-water marine resources off Washington and Oregon. In 1963, she joined the BCF ship George B. Kelez in experimental trawling for salmon off Alaska.

=== NOAA ===
On 3 October 1970, a reorganization occurred which created NOAA under the United States Department of Commerce. Under the reorganization, the BCF came under the control of the new National Marine Fisheries Service NMFS, an element of NOAA, and via a phased process during 1972 and 1973 the ships of the NMFS and of another element of NOAA, the National Ocean Survey – successor to the United States Coast and Geodetic Survey, which was abolished upon the 1970 creation of NOAA – were brought together to form a consolidated NOAA fleet. John N. Cobb became a part of the new NOAA fleet via this process and was redesignated NOAAS John N. Cobb (R 552). With her home port at NOAA's Marine Operations Center-Pacific (MOC-P) in Seattle and operated by NOAA's Office of Marine and Aviation Operations, John N. Cobb conducted research off southeastern Alaska and the Pacific Northwest of the United States. She supported research of the NMFS Auke Bay Laboratory in Juneau, Alaska, collecting fish and crustacean specimens using trawls and benthic longlines; and fish larvae, fish eggs, and plankton using plankton nets and surface and mid-water larval nets. Scientists from the National Marine Mammal Laboratory in Seattle also conducted surveys of whales and porpoises – including cetacean ecology and humpback whale prey investigations – and of seals, and studied harbor seal ecology near tidewater glaciers while aboard John N. Cobb. She also took part in coral and sponge benthic habitat studies, the mapping of near-shore estuary habitats, sablefish tagging and telemetry studies, assessments of juvenile rockfish habitats, and oceanographic sampling and long-term coastal monitoring, and she provided support to remote field camps and the Little Port Walter Marine Station in Port Walter, Alaska.

In the early 1980s John N. Cobb collaborated with other research vessels in a research project using small mesh purse seines to sample juvenile salmon off the coasts of Alaska, British Columbia, Oregon, and Washington. In the immediate aftermath of the Exxon Valdez oil spill on Bligh Reef in Alaska's Prince William Sound on 29 March 1989, John N. Cobb, which was in an inactive status at the time, quickly returned to active duty and played an important role in post-spill research on the effects of the spill on the environment. In subsequent years, she supported numerous studies of the lasting ecological effects of the spill on Prince William Sound.

In the mid-1990s, John N. Cobb came to the assistance of the purse-seiner Karen Rae, which was in distress in Icy Strait in the Alexander Archipelago in southeastern Alaska.

As fisheries science renewed its focus on the marine ecology of juvenile salmon and other epipelagic fishes, John N. Cobb helped to pioneer the use of surface rope trawls from 1997 to 2007. This led to the creation of the Southeast Coastal Monitoring Project and allowed the development of an understanding of the biophysical factors affecting fluctuations from year to year in salmon populations.

John N. Cobb's 50th anniversary in the fleets of NOAA and its predecessors was celebrated in 2000. On 10 May 2004, she rendered assistance to the Alaska Marine Highway System ferry LeConte, which had run aground that morning in Peril Strait near Cozian Reef, about 30 nautical miles (56 km; 35 mi) north of Sitka, Alaska. She joined other vessels in rescuing LeConte's 86 passengers from life rafts, picking up most of them herself.

NOAA's plans called for John N. Cobb to remain active until August 2008, but the main crankshaft in her original 1931 Fairbanks-Morse locomotive engine broke in June 2008, rendering her inoperable. Repairs were estimated to cost $245,000 and take four to six months to complete, so NOAA decided to bring her long career to an end. She was decommissioned on 13 August 2008 at the Sand Point facility in Seattle, and was the oldest NOAA ship at the time of her decommissioning.

=== Later career ===
After decommissioning John N. Cobb, NOAA donated her to the Seattle Maritime Academy, a branch of Seattle Central Community College, and she was moved to Salmon Bay in Seattle. She was listed on the National Register of Historic Places on 11 February 2009, but the academy never repaired her broken crankshaft, and she remained moored in Salmon Bay under the Ballard Bridge for about seven years. In 2015, the academy sold her to Daniel J. Webb, who moved her to Port Townsend, Washington, in February 2016 to repair her crankshaft. However, John N. Cobb by then was waterlogged and too heavy for the port's equipment to haul out of the water. Unable to pay her mooring fees or for her repairs, Webb abandoned her at Port Townsend. A legal dispute over payment of mooring fees and for repairs to the vessel broke out during 2016 between the Port of Port Townsend and the State of Washington, which represented the Seattle Maritime Academy; the port claimed that the academy had violated the law by selling an unseaworthy vessel to an owner who could not afford to repair her, while the state countered that the law exempted unregistered vessels used primarily for government purposes, that the academy had never registered John N. Cobb and therefore was not bound by the law, that the academy was free to surplus the vessel in any way it saw fit consistent with the wishes of her donor, and that any matter of financial restitution to the port was matter between the port and Webb.

Meanwhile, the Port of Port Townsend sought and gained custody of John N. Cobb because of her overdue mooring fees, pumped the water out of her, and hauled her out of the water in October 2016 for an inspection, estimating her to be worth US$300,000 once repaired but requiring US$250,000 in repairs, and estimating her scrap value as US$50,000. Hoping to find a buyer who would preserve her but willing to sell her to a scrapyard if no other buyer came forward, the port then put her up for sale. On 26 April 2017, Ron Sloan purchased John N. Cobb, and he contracted with the fishing vessel Sunnford to tow her from Seattle to Winchester Bay, Oregon, where she arrived on 18 August 2017. As of 2017, John N. Cobb was undergoing repair for commercial use in tuna fishing and for charter for fisheries research and other activities during the off-season.

== See also ==
- NOAA ships and aircraft
