= RV Gloria Michelle =

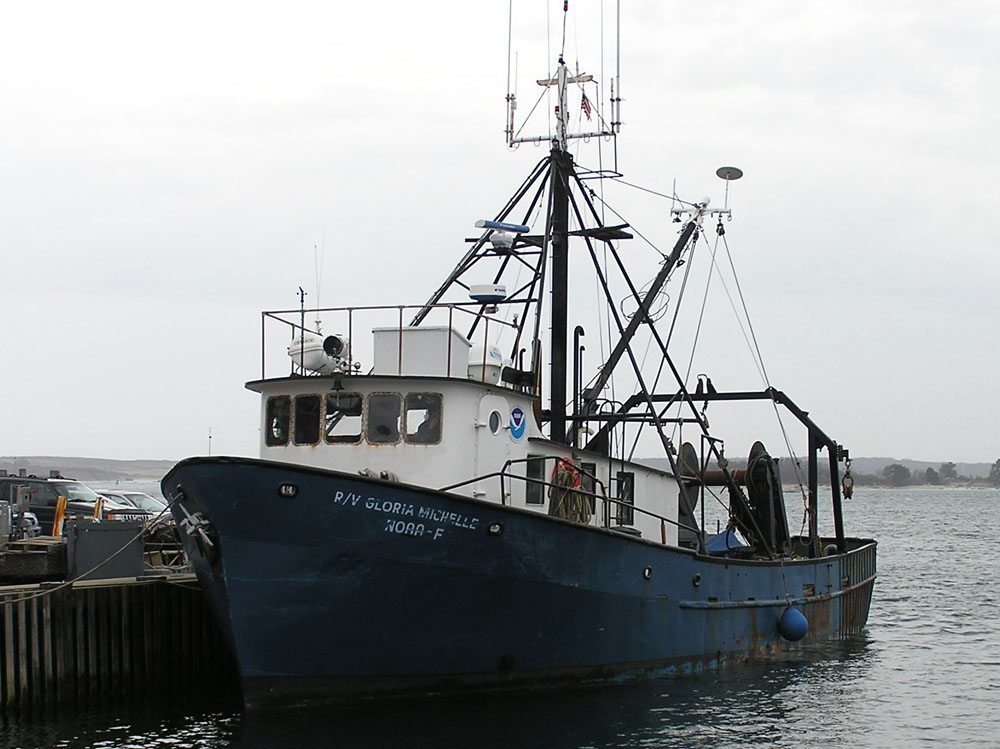
- RV Gloria Michelle moored at the NOAA Northeast Fisheries Science Center's Woods Hole Laboratory dock in Woods Hole, Massachusetts.

History

National Oceanic and Atmospheric Administration
- Name: RV Gloria Michelle
- Namesake: Previous name retained
- Builder: Diesel Shipbuilding Company, Jacksonville, Florida
- Completed: 1974
- Acquired: 1979
- In service: 1980
- Home port: Woods Hole, Massachusetts
- Identification: MMSI number: 338066383; Callsign: KJLW
- Status: Active
- Notes: Pennant no. F7201

General characteristics
- Type: Fisheries research vessel
- Tonnage: 96 gross registered tons; 64 net tons
- Length: 72 ft (22 m) overall
- Beam: 20 ft (6.1 m)
- Height: 58 ft (18 m) (air draft)
- Draft: 7.5 ft (2.3 m) forward; 9.5 ft (2.9 m) aft
- Propulsion: One Caterpillar 3406 diesel engine, 365 shp (272-kW) at 1,800 rpm, one shaft, one 64 in (1.6 m) four-bladed, fixed-pitch propeller, B20 biodiesel fuel
- Endurance: 5 days
- Complement: 2 NOAA Corps commissioned officers, plus up to 14 additional personnel (scientists, technicians, observers, extra crew members) for a day trip or up to 8 additional personnel for an overnight trip
- Notes: Transducer offset 7 ft (2.1 m) (below waterline)

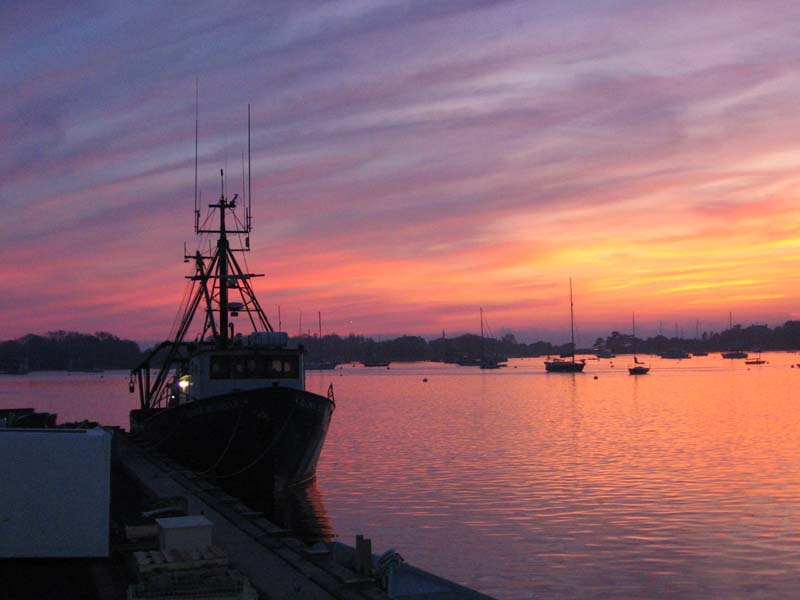
RV Gloria Michelle at sunset, moored at the NOAA NEFSC Woods Hole Laboratory dock in Woods Hole, Massachusetts.

RV Gloria Michelle (F7201), sometimes rendered as R/V Gloria Michelle, is an American fisheries research vessel in non-commissioned service in the National Oceanic and Atmospheric Administration (NOAA) fleet since 1980. Prior to her NOAA career, she was a commercial shrimp boat that came into the possession of the United States Government after her seizure for carrying marijuana.

Registered as NOAA F7201, Gloria Michelle conducts operations in coastal waters along the northeastern coast of North America.

== Construction and acquisition ==
The Diesel Shipbuilding Company built Gloria Michelle at Jacksonville, Florida, in 1974 as a steel-hulled, diesel-powered commercial shrimp boat for use in the Gulf of Mexico. In 1979, the United States Customs Service seized Gloria Michelle after discovering 16 short tons (14.25 long tons; 14.5 metric tons/tonnes) of marijuana in her fish hold, at the time the largest seizure of illegal drugs in the history of Mississippi. After the conclusion of the trial of the people involved in smuggling the marijuana, Gloria Michelle was laid up in a bayou near Biloxi, Mississippi, to await her fate.

At about the same time, the Conservation Engineering Group at the Northeast Fisheries Science Center (NEFSC) at NOAA's National Marine Fisheries Service Gloucester Laboratory in Gloucester, Massachusetts, was looking for a replacement for RV Rorqual, a 40-year-old former United States Army harbor tug the NEFSC used to support its fisheries science activities and its work designing and testing commercial fishing gear. Finding Gloria Michelle well-suited for these endeavors, NOAA acquired her and assigned her to the Conservation Engineering Group at Gloucester. Too small to meet NOAA's criteria for entering commissioned service because she is under 90 feet (27 meters) in length, Gloria Michelle instead entered non-commissioned service with NOAA as RV Gloria Michelle in 1980 after undergoing extensive modifications and upgrades necessary for her to operate as a research vessel.

NOAA subsequently sold Gloria Michelle's predecessor Rorqual at public auction.

== Characteristics and capabilities ==
Built as a commercial fishing vessel, Gloria Michelle offered many features lacking aboard her predecessor Rorqual. Configured as a stern trawler, she had a larger deck area suitable for research work, a refrigerated fish hold, and a diesel engine offering twice the horsepower of Rorqual's powerplant. Since NOAA acquired her in 1979, Gloria Michelle has undergone extensive modifications and upgrades – including the conversion of her refrigerated fish hold into space for berthing, a laboratory, and a septic system – and now only her hull is original; among equipment NOAA installed aboard her are a winch and an articulated crane for handling and recovering equipment. Her hull is painted deep blue, and her deckhouse is white.

Gloria Michelle has a permanently assigned crew of two people, both officers of the NOAA Commissioned Officer Corps, one of them serving as officer-in-charge – who both commands the vessel while she is underway and is her chief administrator when she is in port – and the other as junior officer-in-charge. She can embark up to an additional 14 people for day trips or up to an additional eight people for trips requiring an overnight stay on board. Except on short trips, NOAA usually assigns one or two additional crew members to Gloria Michelle temporarily to assist her two permanently assigned officers in operating the vessel. Additional personnel embarked usually are scientists involved in fisheries research.

Gloria Michelle has a five-day endurance, the limiting factor being the supply of food she can carry for her crew and passengers.

== Operations and service history ==
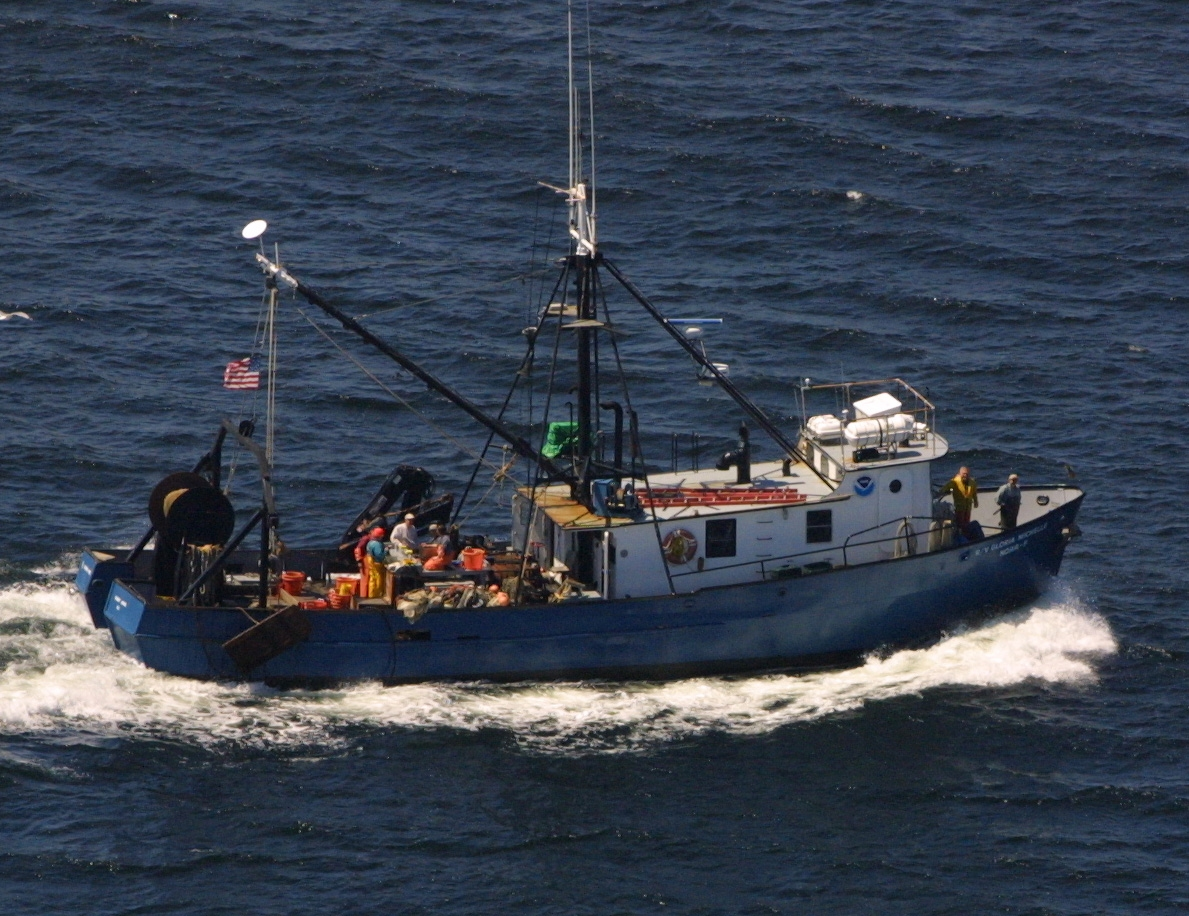
RV Gloria Michelle operating at sea in the early 1990s during the years her home port was at Sandy Hook, New Jersey.

Assigned to support of the Conservation Engineering Group at NEFSC's Gloucester Laboratory and home-ported at Gloucester, Gloira Michelle began operations with NOAA in 1980. In her early years, she engaged in cooperative experiments and tested new scallop dredges, beam trawls, and groundfish nets designed to reduce wasteful and destructive bycatch. When the Conservation Engineering Group moved to the NEFSC's Narragansett Laboratory in Narragansett, Rhode Island, in the mid-1980s, NOAA relocated Gloria Michelle there as well. After the NEFSC opened its Sandy Hook Laboratory in Sandy Hook, New Jersey, NOAA moved Gloria Michelle to Sandy Hook to support it, which she did during the early 1990s. After that stint, she finally moved to her current home port at Woods Hole, Massachusetts, from which she supports the NEFSC's Woods Hole Laboratory.

Gloria Michelle operates along the coast of North America from Virginia to Canada and as far offshore as George's Bank, usually between April and October each year, offering junior NOAA Corps officers an opportunity to demonstrate their leadership and seamanship aboard a NOAA vessel early in their careers. She carries out an annual survey of shrimp populations in the Gulf of Maine – a joint effort of the NEFSC and the Massachusetts Division of Marine Fisheries – over a four-week period in July and August, embarking ten passengers and crew for voyages of up to five days at a time. Since 1982, she also has conducted annual spring and autumn surveys, each three weeks long, of groundfish populations for the Massachusetts Division of Marine Fisheries, making day trips seven days a week with a crew of three or four and four or five scientists on board. During these surveys, Gloria Michelle typically fishes for 15 to 20 minutes at a time, brings everything aboard for embarked scientists to measure and study, and then repeats the process. Scientists choose the locations for the surveys, some of them at random and others at historical sites; in the latter case, survey activities must be carried out in exactly the same way every year. Information the scientists gather is used to determine fishing quotas for each year, although scientists take advantage of the survey process to gather other information of interest as well.

During the rest of her annual operating season, Gloria Michelle engages in a variety of special projects, which have included deploying a wave data buoy in Rhode Island Sound for the United States Army Corps of Engineers, multibeam sonar mapping of underwater topography, testing of new technology, recovery of equipment lost by other vessels, and photographic identification of marine mammals. In 1994, Gloria Michelle sampled seafood in the waters in and around a toxic waste dumping ground in Massachusetts Bay for the U.S. Food and Drug Administration, which determined the seafood to be safe for human consumption.

On 5 May 2010, a BBC television crew shot footage of Gloria Michelle conducting survey work for a segment about surveying the ocean scheduled to air on an episode of the BBC series Horizon in October 2010.

Rear Admiral Jonathan W. Bailey, the director of the NOAA Commissioned Officer Corps from 2007 until his retirement in 2012, served as officer-in-charge of Gloria Michelle early in his career. On 1 June 2012, Gloria Michelle became the first vessel in the history of NOAA or its ancestor organizations to have an all-female crew.

== See also ==
- NOAA ships and aircraft
