= RV Bay Hydro II =

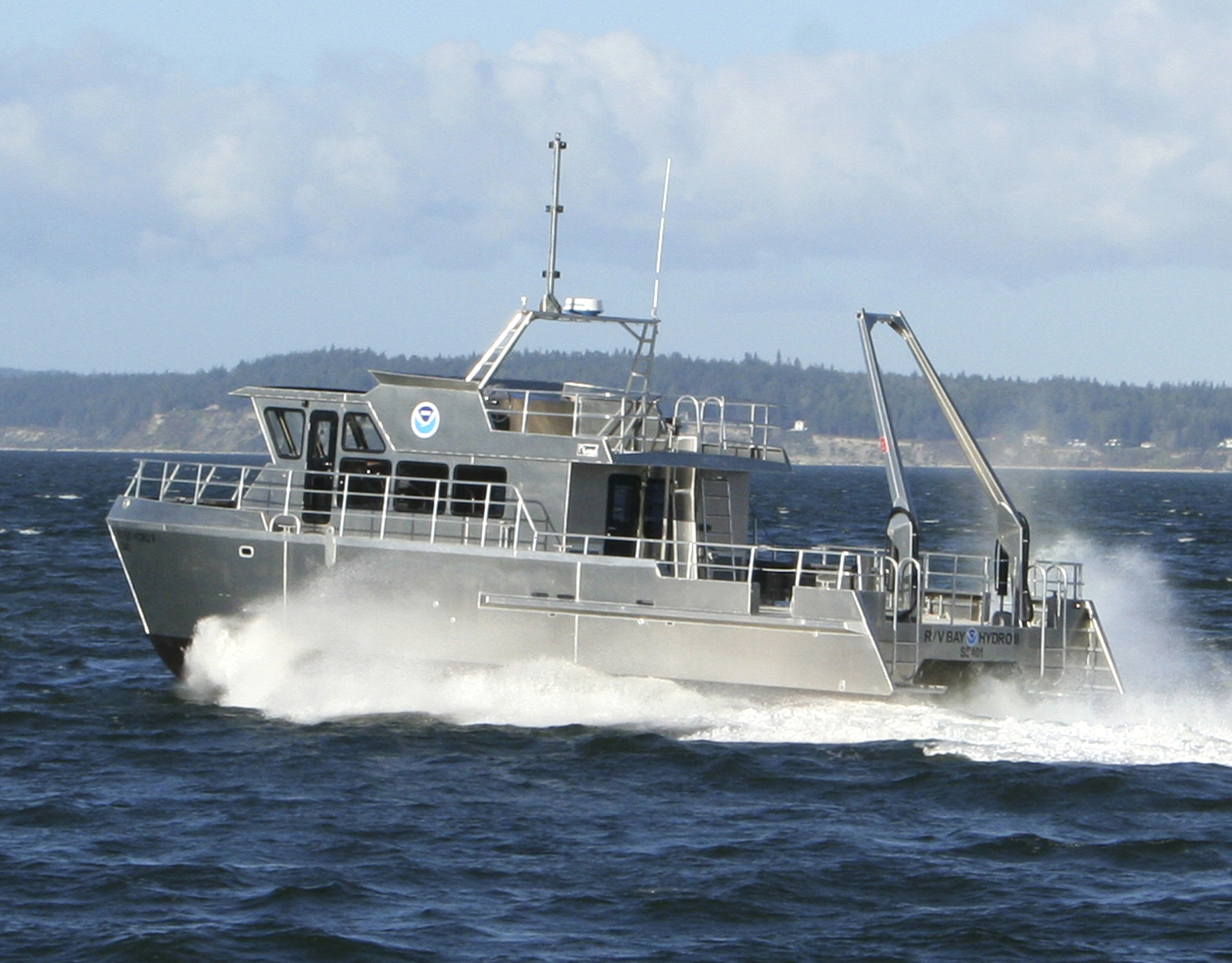
- RV Bay Hydro II on her christening day, 15 April 2009.

History

National Oceanic and Atmospheric Administration
- Name: RV Bay Hydro II
- Completed: September 2008
- In service: 15 April 2009
- Identification: MMSI number: 367381580; Callsign: WDE6545
- Status: Active
- Notes: Pennant no. S5401

General characteristics
- Type: Oceanographic research vessel
- Length: 54 or 57 feet (16.46 or 17.37 m)
- Beam: 20 feet (6.1 m)
- Installed power: 2x 12-kW Northern Lights generators
- Propulsion: 2 x 740 brake horsepower (552 kW) MTU 6062 HK31 engines, 2 x ZF 360A transmissions, 2 x Michigan Wheel 5-blade propellers, 1,200 US gallons (4,542 L; 999 imp gal) fuel
- Speed: 30 knots (56 km/h; 35 mph)

RV Bay Hydro II (S5401), sometimes rendered as R/V Bay Hydro II, is an American oceanographic research vessel in non-commissioned service in the fleet of the National Oceanic and Atmospheric Administration (NOAA) since 2009. She is registered as NOAA S5401.

== Design ==
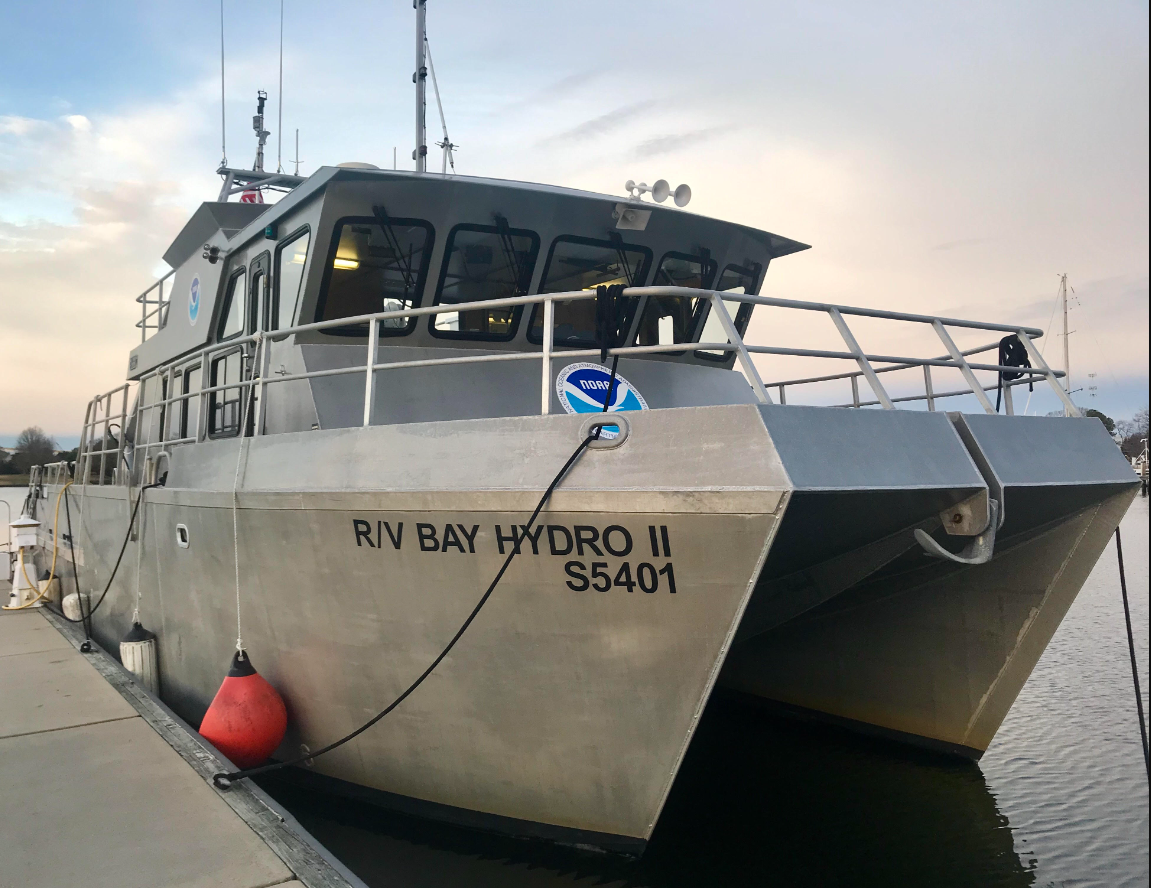
RV Bay Hydro II.

Bay Hydro II is a hydrofoil-assisted catamaran. At 54 or 57 feet (16.46 or 17.37 m) in length (sources disagree), she is one of the smallest research vessels in the NOAA fleet. Her twin 740 bhp (552 kW) engines are rated at 2,300 rpm each and give her a maximum speed of 30 knots (56 km/h; 35 mph).

Bay Hydro II has a 3-by-7-foot (0.91 by 2.13 m) moon pool in her main deck amidships through which she can deploy a sonar on a retractable strut. She also has two hull-mounted Airmar M42 dual-frequency transducers and an Interocean survey winch for use in towing side-scan sonar equipment.

In addition to her sonars, Bay Hydro II has an A-frame davit rated for 2,000 pounds (907 kg), a 52,000 BTU (54,863 kJ) HVAC system, a 150-US-gallon (570 L; 120 imp gal) fresh water capacity, a full galley, and crew accommodations.

== Construction ==
Bay Hydro II was ordered in early 2008 from Kvichak Marine Industries in Seattle, Washington. and completed in September 2008. After her delivery to NOAA, her christening ceremony took place on 15 April 2009 at the Inner Harbor in Baltimore, Maryland. During the ceremony, she received a cannon salute from the sloop-of-war Constellation, a museum ship moored in the Inner Harbor.

== Operations and service history ==
Bay Hydro II is based at the NOAA facility at Solomons, Maryland. She conducts hydrographic survey and environmental protection research operations in the Chesapeake Bay. Upon her christening in April 2009, NOAA noted that her surveying capabilities were the state of the art at the time, and gave NOAA a capability to gather data to create highly accurate nautical charts, including data well on changes in dredged channels, and to respond rapidly to requirements to collect information on new hazards to navigation created by hurricanes, ice, and shipwrecks. Her activities in the Chesapeake Bay support safe navigation to a number of large ports, including Baltimore, Maryland; Wilmington, Delaware; Philadelphia, Pennsylvania; and ports in the Hampton Roads area of Virginia.

NOAA also uses Bay Hydro II to evaluate new hydrographic survey techniques and for outreach to elementary schools, secondary schools, and universities.

== See also ==
- NOAA ships and aircraft
