= NOAAS Delaware II =

American fisheries research vessel

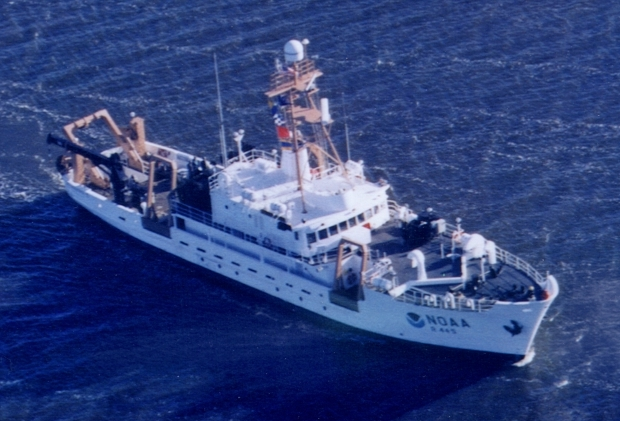
- NOAAS Delaware II (R 445) in November 1983.

History

U.S. Fish and Wildlife Service
- Name: US FWS Delaware II
- Builder: South Portland Engineering, South Portland, Maine
- Launched: December 1967
- Commissioned: October 1968
- Identification: IMO number: 7629946
- Fate: Transferred to National Oceanic and Atmospheric Administration 3 October 1970

National Oceanic and Atmospheric Administration
- Name: NOAAS Delaware II (R 445)
- Acquired: Transferred from Bureau of Commercial Fisheries 3 October 1970
- Decommissioned: 28 September 2012
- Identification: IMO number: 7629946; MMSI number: 518797000; Callsign: E5U2744
- Fate: Sold

Panama
- Name: RV Med Surveyor
- In service: ca. 2014
- Identification: IMO number: 7629946; MMSI number: 352572000; Callsign: HP8784

General characteristics (as NOAA vessel)
- Type: Fisheries research ship
- Tonnage: 483 gross tons; 231 net register tons
- Displacement: 785 tons (full load)
- Length: 155 ft (47 m)
- Beam: 30 ft 2 in (9.19 m)
- Draft: 14 ft 9 in (4.50 m)
- Installed power: 1,230 brake horsepower (0.92 megawatt)
- Propulsion: Two General Motors diesel engine, one shaft, 132 tons fuel
- Speed: 11.5 knots (21 km/h) (sustained)
- Range: 6,600 nautical miles (12,200 km) at 11.5 knots (21 km/h)
- Endurance: 24 days
- Boats & landing craft carried: 1 x 18-foot (5.5 m) rigid hull inflatable boat
- Complement: 18 (1 licensed Master, 1 Chief Mate, 3 NOAA Corps officers, 3 licensed engineers, and 10 other crew members), plus up to 14 scientists
- Notes: 300 kilowatts electrical power

General characteristics (as Med Surveyor)
- Type: Research and survey ship
- Tonnage: 610 gross tons
- Length: 47.4 m (155 ft 6 in)
- Beam: 9.14 m (30.0 ft)

NOAAS Delaware II (R 445) was a National Oceanic and Atmospheric Administration (NOAA) fisheries research vessel in commission from 1970 to 2012. Prior to her NOAA career, she was in commission in the fleet of the United States Fish and Wildlife Service's Bureau of Commercial Fisheries from 1968 to 1970 as US FWS Delaware II. After her NOAA career ended, she was sold and in 2014 was converted into the research and survey ship RV Med Surveyor, operating under the flag of Panama.

== Characteristics and capabilities ==
Delaware II's hull was 155 feet (47 metres) long, and she had accommodations for 32 personnel. The mess room could seat 16 for meals. She carried a crew of 18, consisting of a licensed master, a chief mate, three NOAA Corps officers, three licensed engineers, and 10 other crew members. In addition, she could accommodate up to 14 scientists.

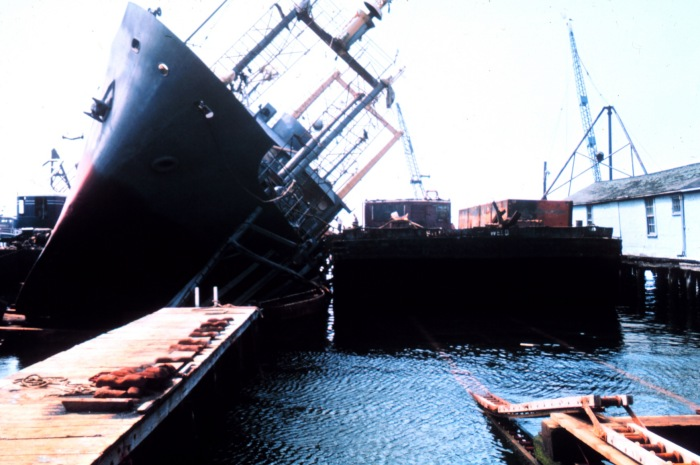
Delaware II after a drydock mishap.

Delaware II's deck equipment featured five winches, one boom crane, two A-frames, and a movable gantry. This equipment gave Delaware II a lifting capacity of up to 7,000 pounds (3,200 kilograms) as well 19,680 feet (6,000 metres) of cable that could pull up to 20,000 pounds (9,100 kilograms). Each of the winches served a specialized function ranging from trawling to hydrographic surveys.

In support of her primary mission of fishery and living marine resource research for the National Marine Fisheries Service (NMFS) division of NOAA, Delaware II had echo sounders and an acoustic doppler current profiler (ADCP). Additional scientific equipment included a thermosalinograph; a conductivity, temperature, and depth profiler; three hull-mounted sea-surface temperature probes, and a fluorometer. She had 666 square feet (61.9 square metres) of laboratory space with a wet laboratory and a dry/chemistry laboratory. She also had a 201-cubic-foot (5.7-cubic-metre) walk-in freezer. She carried an 18-foot (5.5-metre) rigid hull inflatable boat for utility use and rescue operations.

== Construction and U.S. service history ==
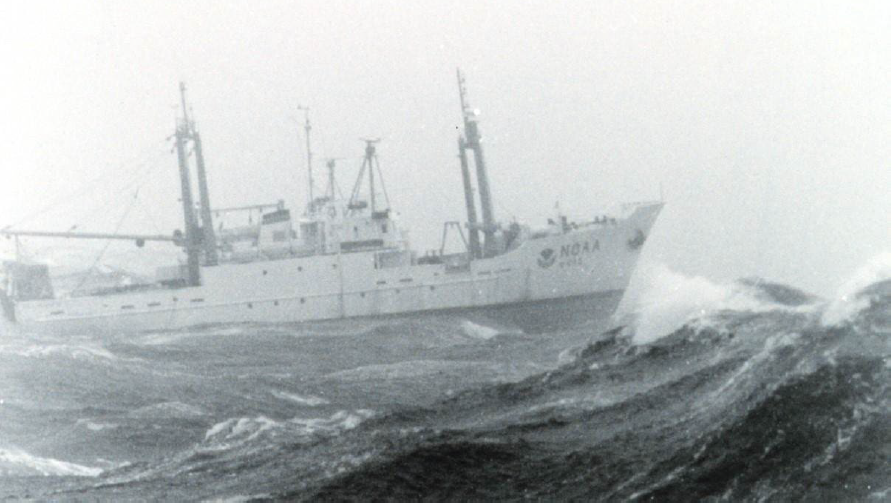
Delaware II in a storm on Georges Bank in the late 1970s.

Delaware II was built at South Portland Engineering in South Portland, Maine. She was launched in December 1967 and commissioned in October 1968 into service with the Fish and Wildlife Service's Bureau of Commercial Fisheries as US FWS Delaware II. When NOAA was established on 3 October 1970, she became part of NOAA's fleet as NOAAS Delaware II (R 445).

Based at Woods Hole, Massachusetts, and operated by NOAA's Office of Marine and Aviation Operations, Delaware II conducted fishery research in support of NMFS's Northeast Fisheries Science Center's (NEFSC) Woods Hole Laboratory. She normally operated in the Gulf of Maine, on the Georges Bank, and on the continental shelf and continental slope from southern New England to Cape Hatteras, North Carolina. Typical assessment work included groundfish assessment surveys and marine resources monitoring, assessment, and prediction (MARMAP) surveys. Research conducted from Delaware II sought to understand the physical and biological processes that control year-class strength of key, economically important fish species.

NOAA refurbished and renovated Delaware II in the early 2000s. Delaware II was decommissioned on 28 September 2012 and placed in reserve. She was later sold.

== RV Med Surveyor ==
After her sale, the ship was renamed Med Surveyor. In 2014, she underwent a total transformation into a modern survey vessel with the addition of a hull-mounted multibeam echosounder system, and the addition of an array of survey equipment along with other significant modernization to machinery, electronics, and other systems. Operating under the flag of Panama, she supports cable route surveys for submarine cable systems around the world.

== See also ==
- NOAA ships and aircraft
