= Office of Marine and Aviation Operations =

US platforms operated by NOAA

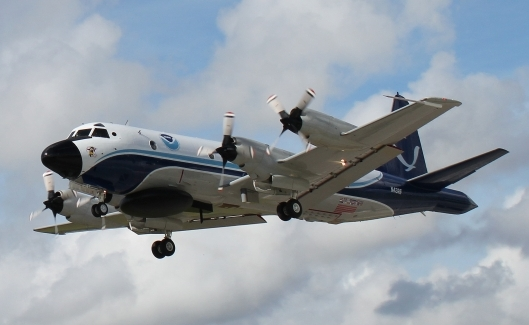
A NOAA Lockheed WP-3D Orion used for hurricane reconnaissance missions.

The Office of Marine and Aviation Operations (OMAO) is a division of the National Oceanic and Atmospheric Administration (NOAA) which operates a wide variety of specialized ships and aircraft to carry out the environmental and scientific missions of NOAA.

== Administration ==
NOAA′s Office of Marine and Aviation Operations (OMAO) operates NOAA′s aircraft and ships. OMAO also manages the NOAA Small Boat Program and the NOAA Diving Program, the latter having as part of its mission the job of ensuring a level of diving skill conducive to safe and efficient operations in NOAA-sponsored underwater activities.

A National Oceanic and Atmospheric Administration Commissioned Officer Corps (NOAA Corps) rear admiral serves as both the director of the NOAA Corps and of OMAO. A NOAA Corps rear admiral (lower half) serves as the director of the Marine and Aviation Operations Centers.

== Manning and resource management ==
NOAA's aircraft and ships are operated and managed by a combination of NOAA Corps officers, NOAA civilians, and wage marine employees. NOAA Corps officers and OMAO civilians frequently serve as chief scientists on program missions. Aboard NOAA ships, NOAA Corps officers perform administrative duties and are responsible for the navigation of the vessels, while NOAA civilians and wage marine employees serve as licensed engineers, mechanics, navigators, technicians, and members of the engine, steward, and deck departments. Aboard both aircraft and ships, NOAA Corps officers and civilian crew members provide mission support and assistance to embarked scientists from various NOAA laboratories and the academic community.

To complement NOAA's aircraft and ship fleets, OMAO contracts for ship and aircraft time with other sources, such as the private sector and universities.

== Aircraft ==
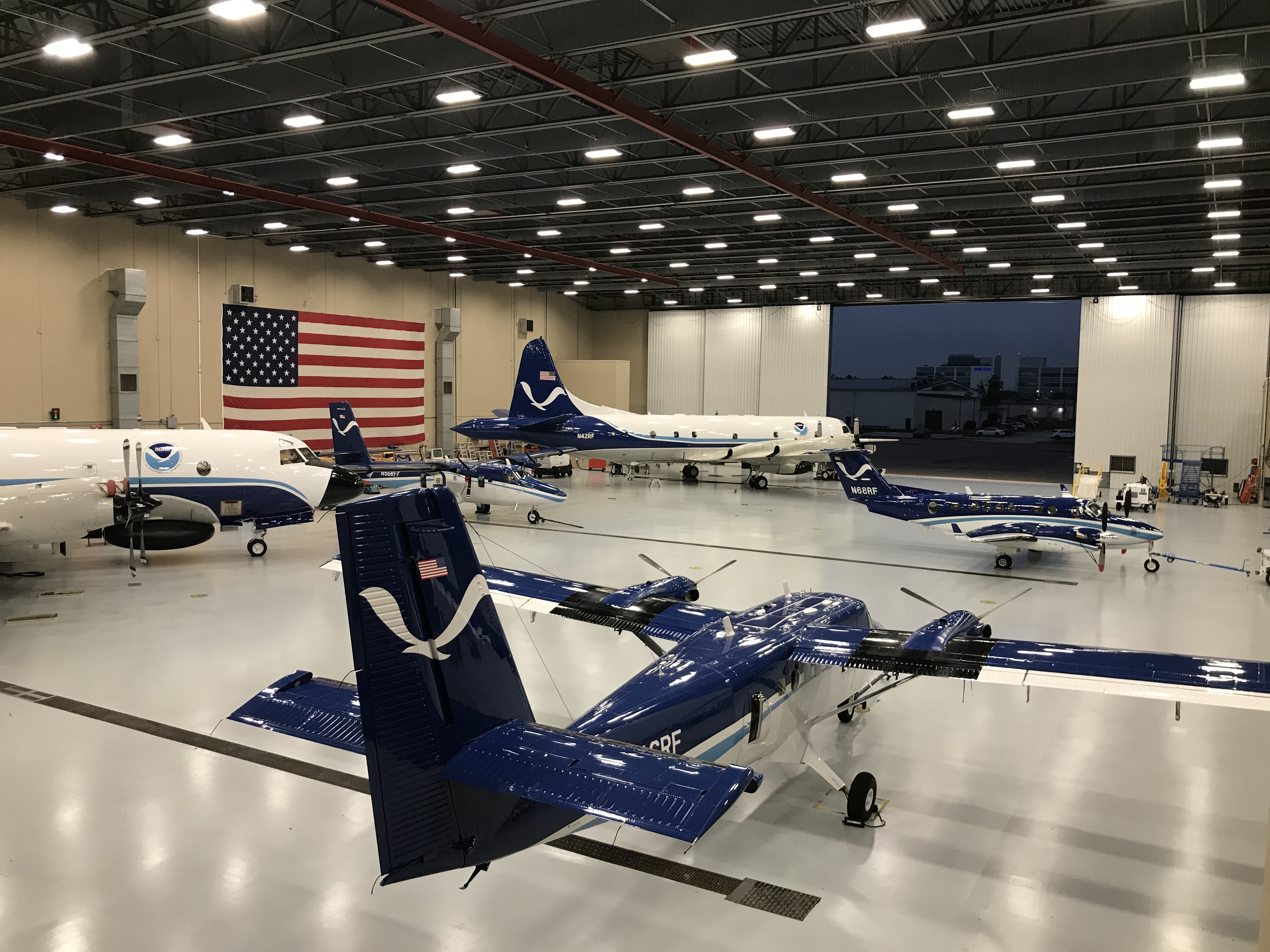
NOAA's two Lockheed WP-3D Orion aircraft along with a De Havilland Canada DHC-6 Twin Otter (foreground) and a Beechcraft King Air inside the NOAA Aircraft Operations Center hangar in Lakeland, Florida.

NOAA's Aircraft Operations Center (AOC) is home to NOAA's fleet of aircraft. It has been located at Lakeland Linder International Airport in Lakeland, Florida, since June 2017. Prior to its move to Lakeland, the AOC resided at MacDill Air Force Base in Tampa, Florida, from January 1993 to June 2017.

NOAA aircraft often operate over open ocean, mountains, coastal wetlands, Arctic pack ice, and in and around hurricanes and other severe weather. The aircraft collect environmental and geographic data for NOAA hurricane and other weather and atmospheric research (including as part of the NOAA Hurricane Hunters program; provide aerial support for coastal and aeronautical charting and remote sensing projects; conduct aerial surveys for hydrologic research; support NOAA's fishery research and marine mammal assessment programs; and provide support to emergency response managers during and after natural disasters.

Aircraft	In service	Orders	Registration #	Introduced	Notes
Beechcraft Super King Air 350CER	3	—	N67RF, N68RF, N65RF	2009	
De Havilland Canada DHC-6 Twin Otter	4	—	N46RF, N48RF, N56RF, N57RF	1994	
Gulfstream IV-SP	1	—	N49RF	2022	
Lockheed WP-3D Orion	2	—	N42RF, N43RF	1976	
Lockheed WC-130J	—	2		2030	To replace Lockheed WP-3D Orion

NOAA also operates unmanned aerial vehicles.

=== Past ===
Aircraft	Qty.	Purchasing Agency	Introduced	Retired
Boeing WB-50A Superfortress	2	NHRL	1956	1958
Boeing WB-47E Stratojet	1	NHRL	1956	1960
Douglas DC-6B	2	NHRL	1960	1975
Douglas WB-26 Invader	1	NHRL	1961	1965
Martin WB-57A Canberra	1	NHRL	1960	1971
Douglas WC-54D Skymaster	1	NHRL	1961	1965
Lockheed WC-130B	1	NHRL	1970	1981
Aero Commander 500	2	NOAA	1984	2023
Lake Renegade	?	NOAA	?	?
Cessna Citation II	?	NOAA	?	?
Bell 212	?	NOAA	?	?
Gulfstream Turbo Commander 695A	1	NOAA	2004	

== Ships ==
=== Fleet origins ===
NOAA's ship fleet traces it ancestry to the fleets of the Survey of the Coast and of the United States Commission of Fish and Fisheries, widely referred to as the United States Fish Commission. The Survey of the Coast, established in 1807, became the United States Coast Survey in 1836 and then the United States Coast and Geodetic Survey in 1878, and it operated a fleet of survey ships that conducted hydrographic surveys along the coasts of the United States and its territories. The Fish Commission, which became the United States Bureau of Fisheries in 1903, operated a fleet that included fisheries research ships until 1940, when the Bureau of Fisheries was abolished and its fleet was transferred to the Department of the Interior′s new Fish and Wildlife Service. In a major reorganization in 1956, the Fish and Wildlife Service became the United States Fish and Wildlife Service, and its new Bureau of Commercial Fisheries took control of the seagoing fisheries research fleet.

The NOAA fleet was created when various United States government scientific agencies merged to form NOAA on 3 October 1970. At that time, the U.S. Coast and Geodetic Survey and the U.S. Fish and Wildlife Service's Bureau of Commercial Fisheries were abolished, and the ships that had constituted their fleets combined to form the new NOAA fleet. At first, the major ships that were to constitute the new fleet reported to separate entities, with former Coast and Geodetic Survey ships subordinate to the National Ocean Survey (renamed the National Ocean Service in 1983, the Coast and Geodetic Survey's successor organization within NOAA), while former Bureau of Commercial Fisheries ships reported to the National Marine Fisheries Service (the successor agency within NOAA of the Fish Commission, Bureau of Fisheries, and Bureau of Commercial Fisheries). Via a phased process during 1972 and 1973, however, the ships of the National Ocean Survey and National Marine Fisheries Service, as well as those of the Environmental Research Laboratories, integrated to form a consolidated and unified NOAA fleet, operated by the National Ocean Survey's Office of Fleet Operations.

=== Ship operations ===
The NOAA fleet provides hydrographic survey, oceanographic and atmospheric research, and fisheries research vessels to support the elements of NOAA's strategic plan and mission. NOAA's Fleet Allocation Council manages and allocates the time each ship spends on various missions and projects based on user requests. Some ships of the fleet are vessels retired from the United States Navy or other maritime services. The vessels are located in various locations around the United States. The ships are managed by the Marine Operations Center, which has offices in Norfolk, Virginia, and Newport, Oregon. Logistic support for these vessels is provided by the Marine Operations Center offices or, for vessels with home ports at Woods Hole, Massachusetts; Charleston, South Carolina; Pascagoula, Mississippi; San Diego, California; or Honolulu, Hawaii, by port captains located in those ports.

=== NOAA research and survey vessels ===
Upon its creation on 3 October 1970, NOAA took control of all ships previously operated by the U.S. Fish and Wildlife Service's Bureau of Commercial Fisheries and the U.S. Coast and Geodetic Survey. NOAA has since decommissioned many of these ships and replaced them with ships acquired from the U.S. Navy or new ships built specifically for NOAA.

The names of NOAA ships are preceded by the prefix "NOAAS" (for "National Oceanic and Atmospheric Administration Ship") and followed by a unique hull classification symbol, or "hull number," made up of a letter indicating whether the vessel is a research ship (R) or survey ship (S), followed by a three-digit number. Each hull classification symbol is unique among NOAA ships currently in commission, although in some cases NOAA uses a hull classification symbol identical to one it used previously for a ship that it has since decommissioned.

==== Present Fleet ====
===== Fisheries research ships =====
- NOAAS Bell M. Shimada (R 227) (in service 2010–present)
- RV Gloria Michelle (in noncommissioned service 1980–present)
- NOAAS Gordon Gunter (R 336) (in service 1998–present; previously with U.S. Navy as USNS Relentless (T-AGOS-18) 1990–1993)
- NOAAS Henry B. Bigelow (R 225) (in service 2007–present)
- NOAAS Oregon II (R 332) (in service 1977–present)
- NOAAS Oscar Dyson (R 224) (in service 2005–present)
- NOAAS Oscar Elton Sette (R 335) (in service 2003–present; previously with U.S. Navy as USNS Adventurous (T-AGOS-13) 1988–1992)
- NOAAS Pisces (R 226) (in service 2009–present)
- NOAAS Reuben Lasker (R 228) (in service 2014–present)
- NOAAS Ronald H. Brown (R 104) (in service 1997–present)

===== Gallery - fisheries research ships =====
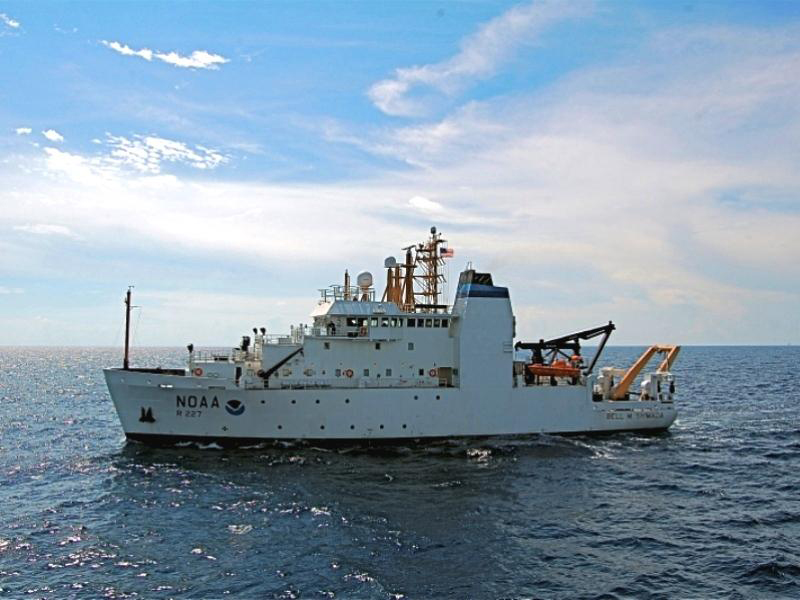
NOAAS Bell M. Shimada (R 227)

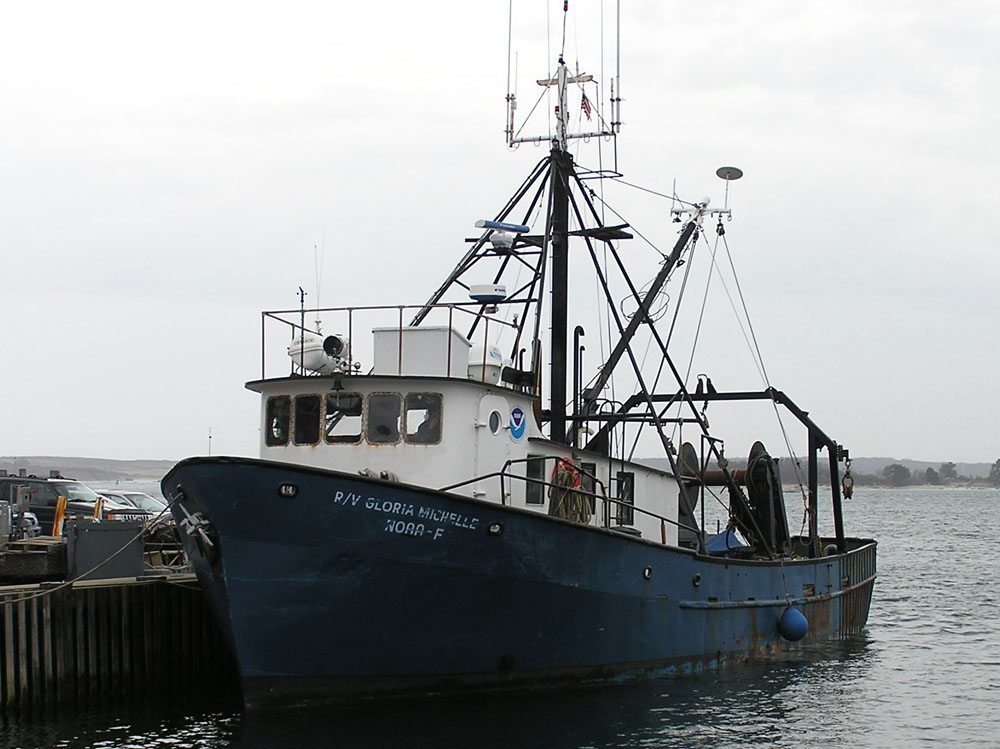
RV Gloria Michelle

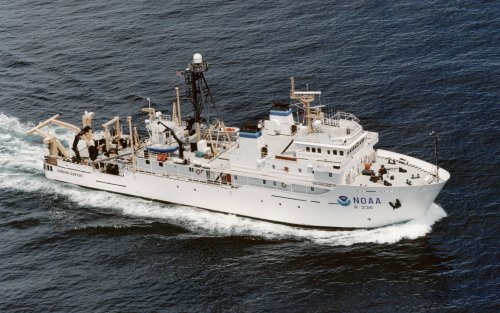
NOAAS Gordon Gunter (R 336)

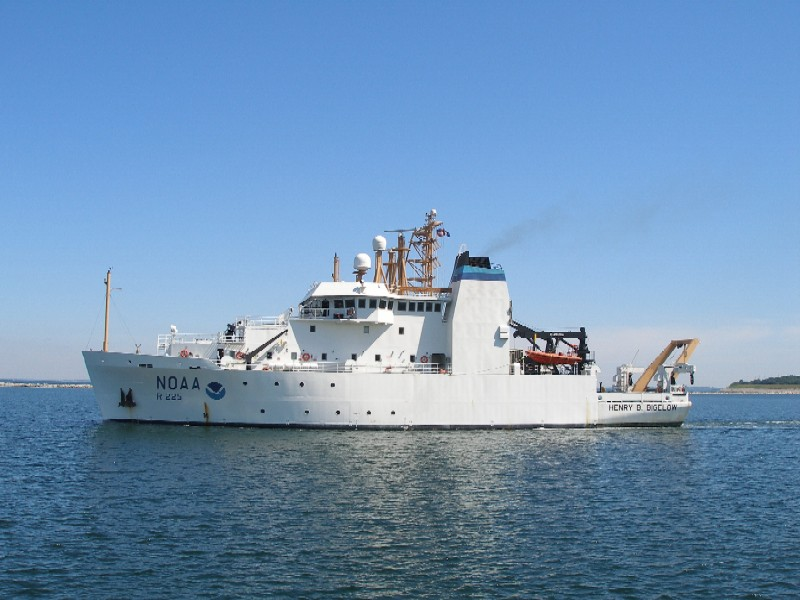
NOAAS Henry B. Bigelow (R 225)

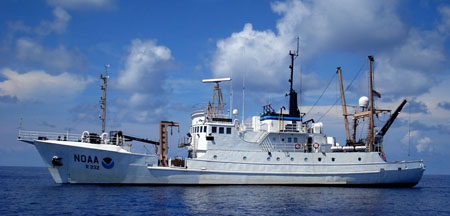
NOAAS Oregon II (R 332)

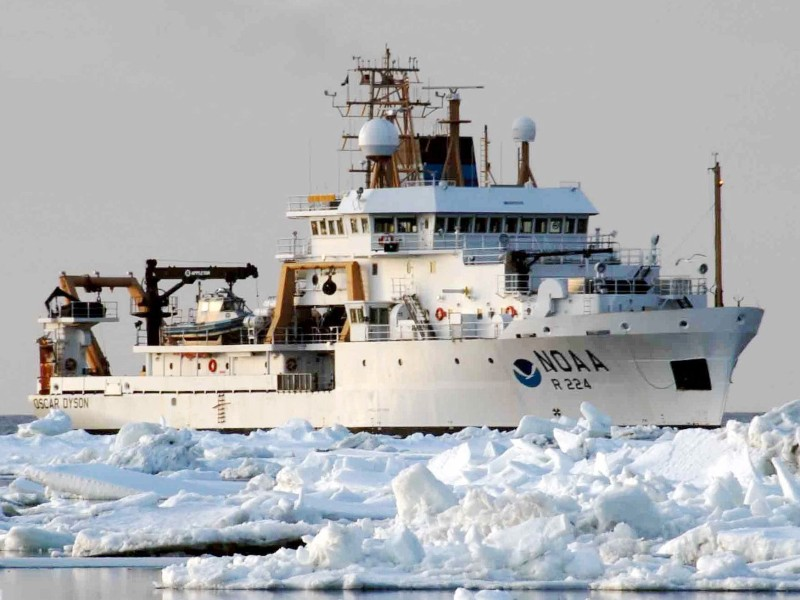
NOAAS Oscar Dyson (R 224)

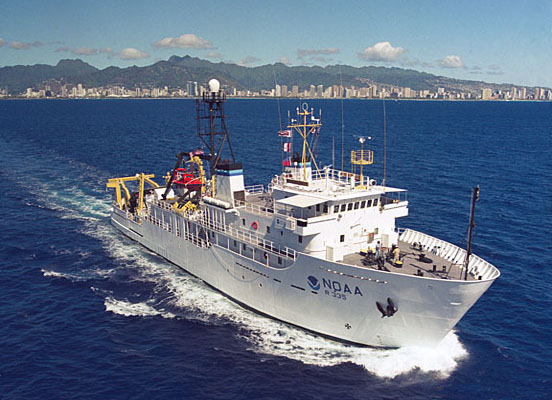
NOAAS Oscar Elton Sette (R 335)

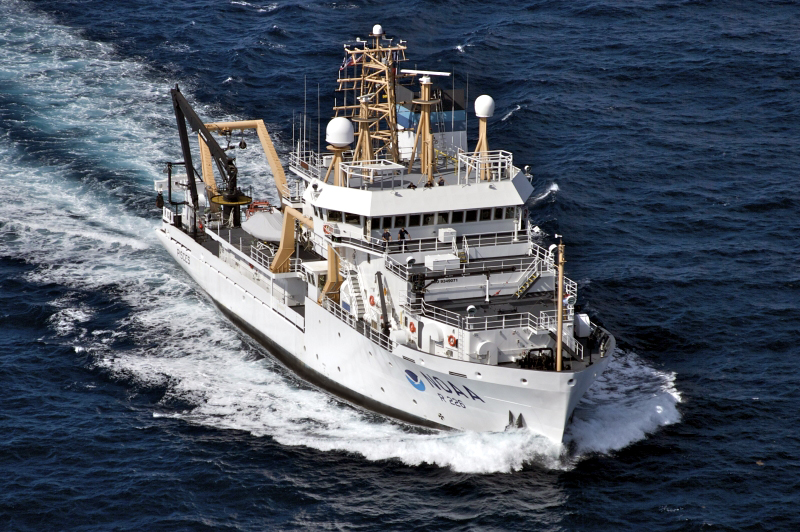
NOAAS Pisces (R 226)

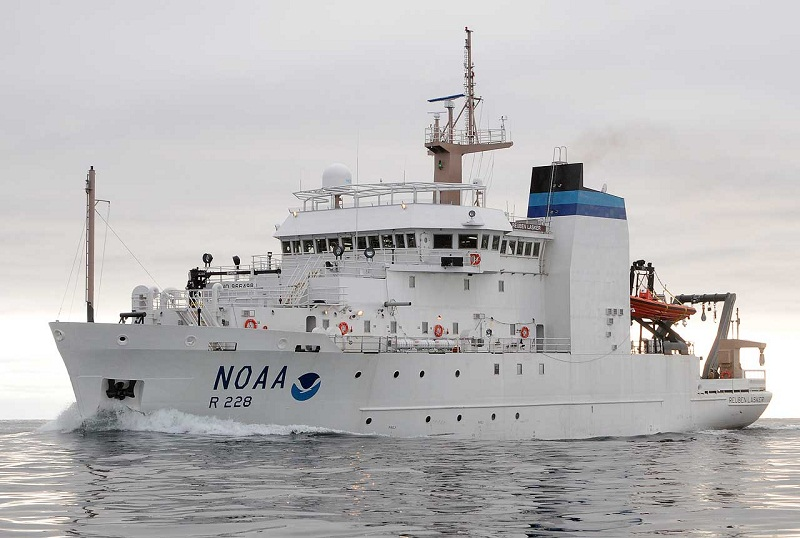
NOAAS Reuben Lasker (R 228)

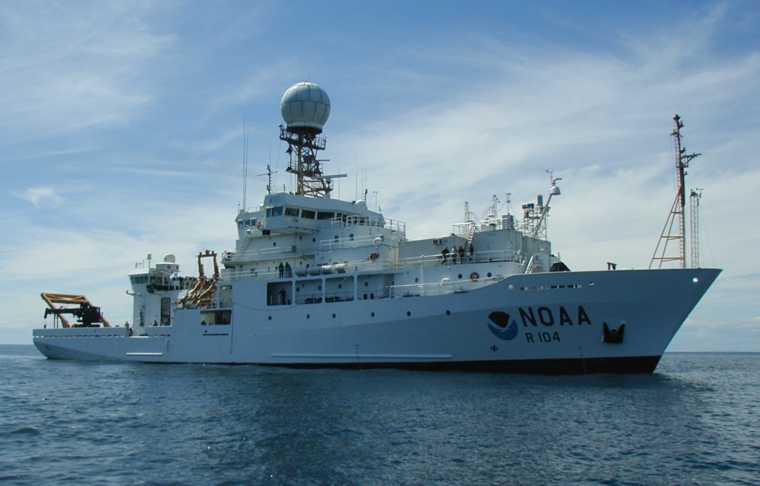
NOAAS Ronald H. Brown (R 104)

===== Hydrographic/oceanographic/atmospheric research ships =====
- RV Bay Hydro II (in noncommissioned service 2009–present)
- NOAAS Discoverer (2024) (under construction; to enter service 2026)
- NOAAS Fairweather (S 220) (in service 1970–1989 and 2004–present; previously with U.S. Coast and Geodetic Survey 1968–1970)
- NOAAS Ferdinand R. Hassler (S 250) (in service 2012–present)
- RV Manta (in noncommissioned service 2008–present)
- NOAAS Nancy Foster (R 352) (in service 2004–present; previously with U.S. Navy as USS Agate Pass (YT-112) 1991–1999)
- NOAAS Oceanographer (2024) (fitting out; to enter service early 2025)
- NOAAS Okeanos Explorer (R 337) (in service 2008–present; previously with U.S. Navy as USNS Capable (T-AGOS-16) 1989–2004)
- NOAAS Rainier (S 221) (in service 1970–present; previously with U.S. Coast and Geodetic Survey 1968–1970)
- NOAAS Ronald H. Brown (R 104) (in service 1997–present)
- NOAAS Thomas Jefferson (S 222) (in service 2003–present; previously with U.S. Navy as USNS Littlehales (T-AGS-52) 1992–2003)

===== Gallery - hydrographic/oceanographic/atmospheric research ships =====
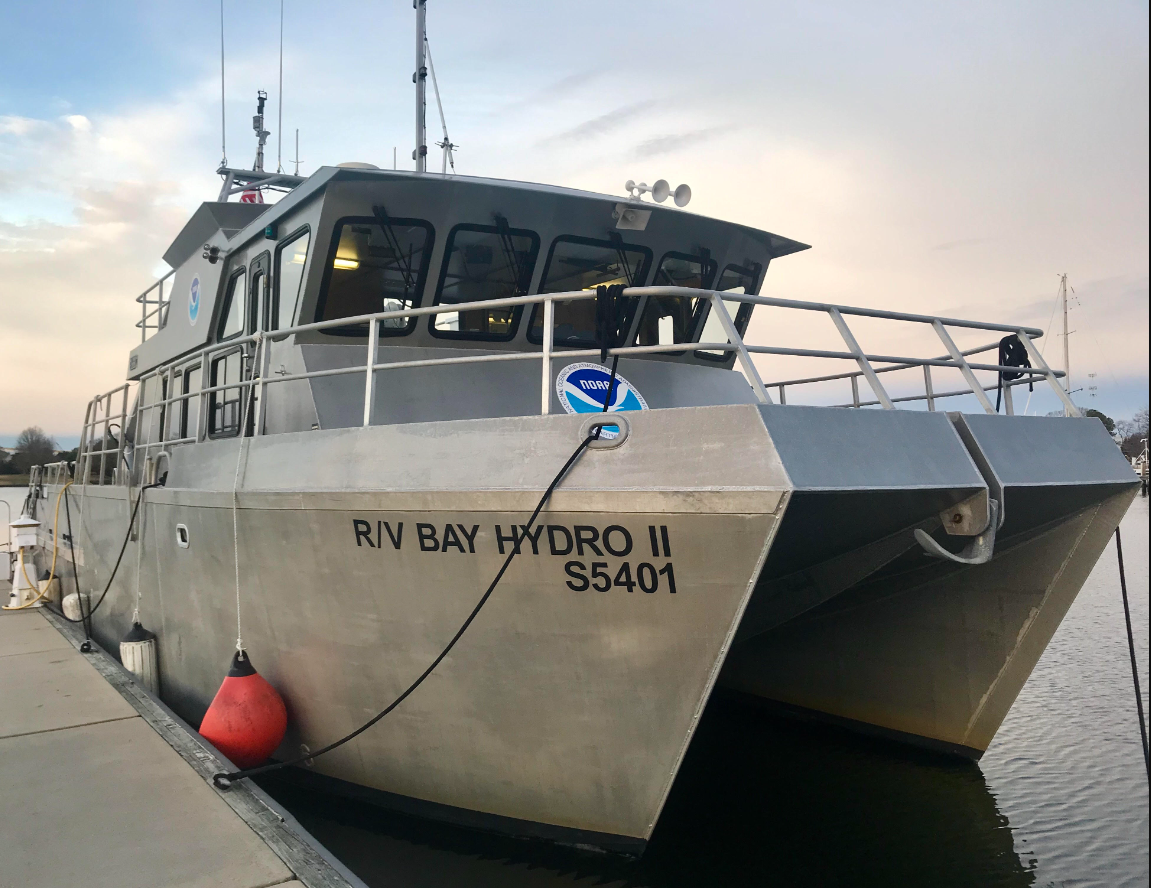
RV Bay Hydro II (S 5401)

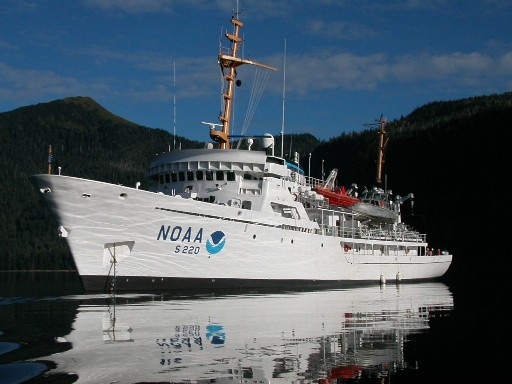
NOAAS Fairweather (S 220)

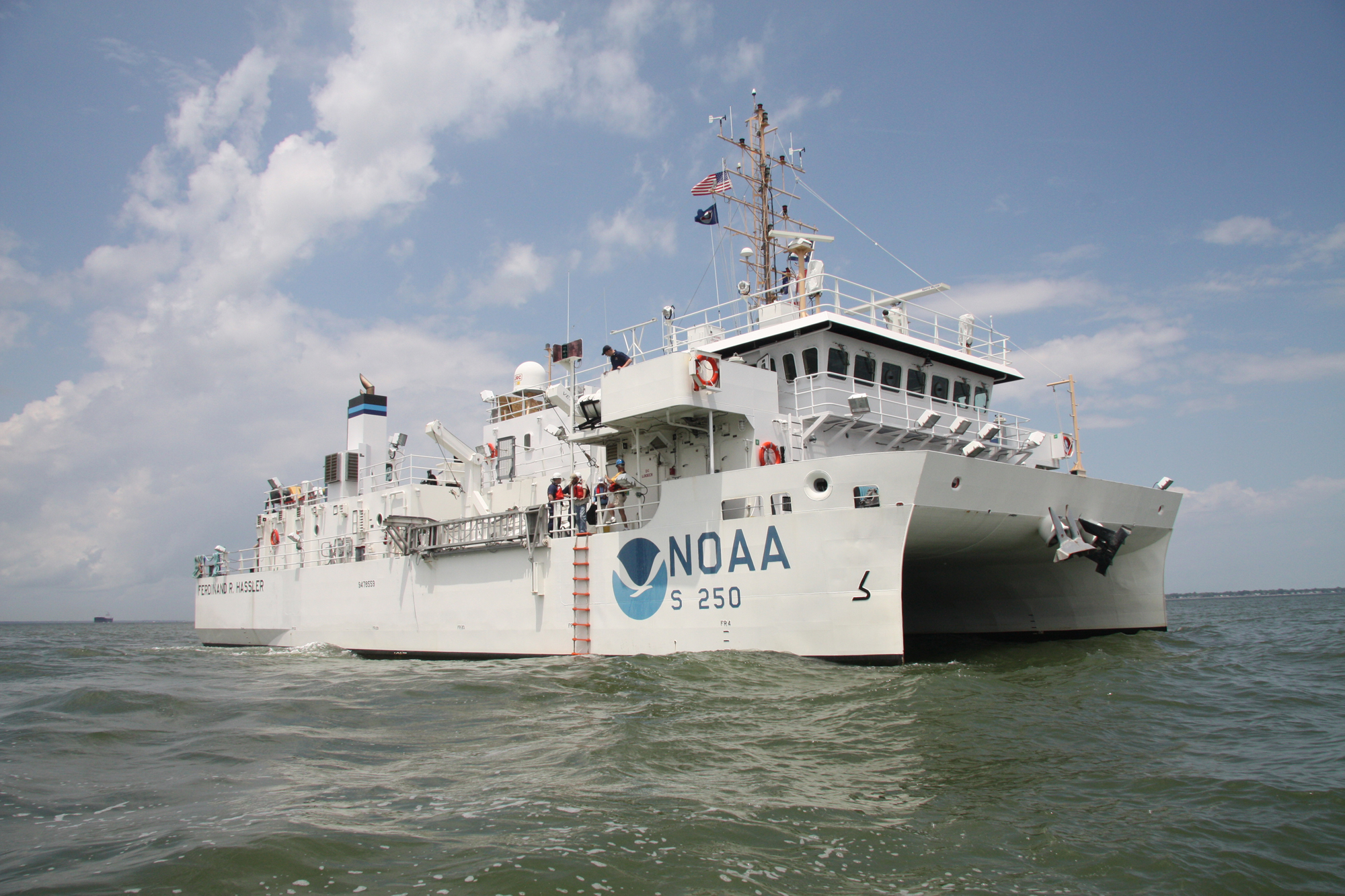
NOAAS Ferdinand R. Hassler (S 250)

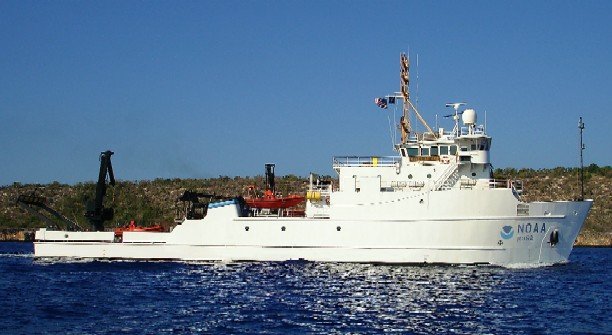
NOAAS Nancy Foster (R 352)

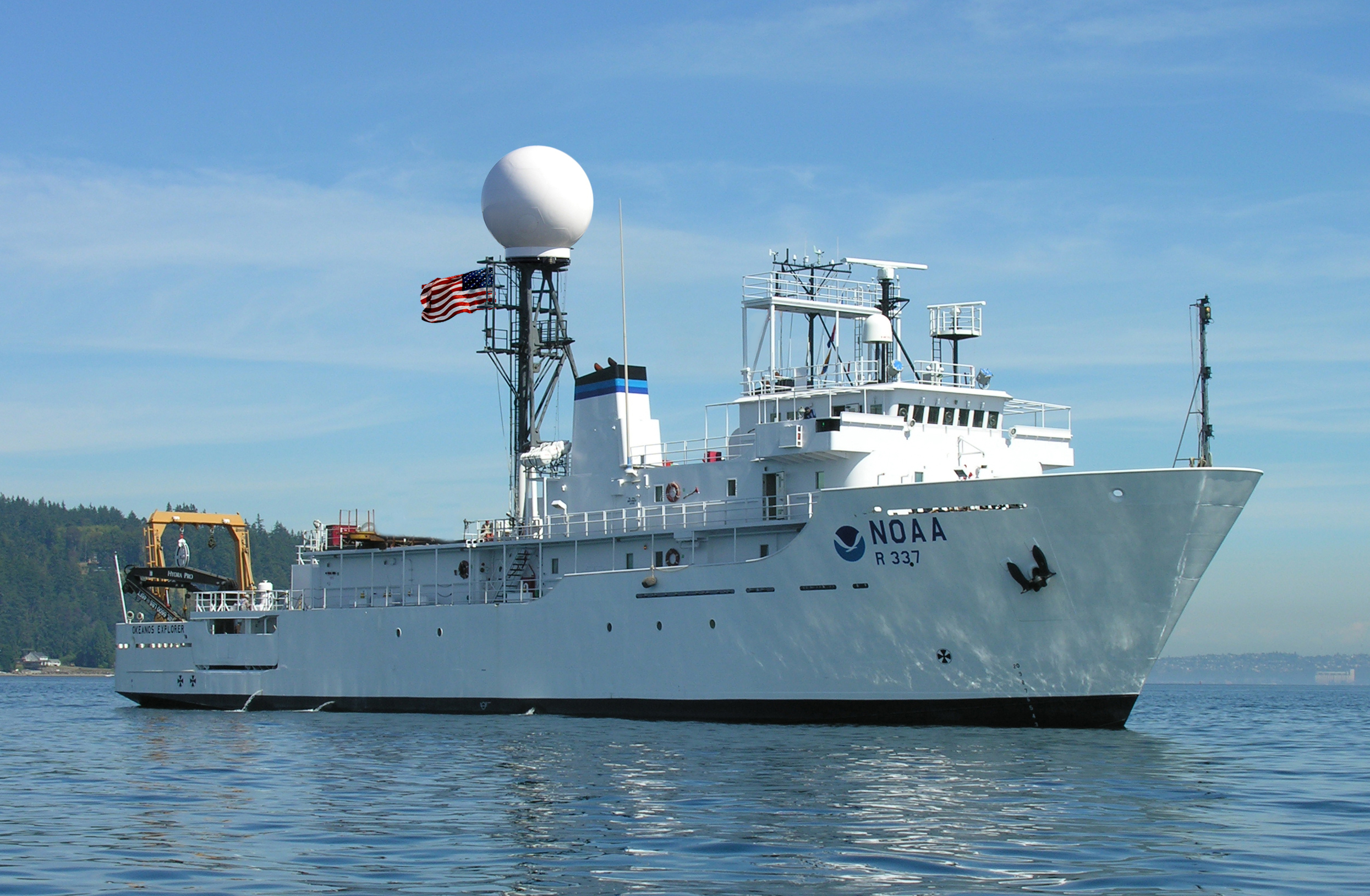
NOAAS Okeanos Explorer (R 337)

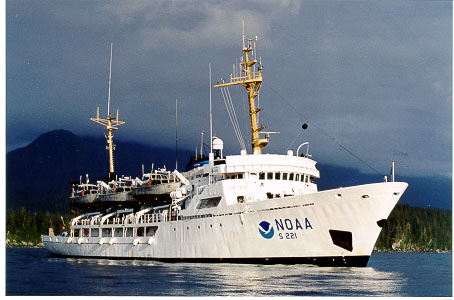
NOAAS Rainier (S 221)

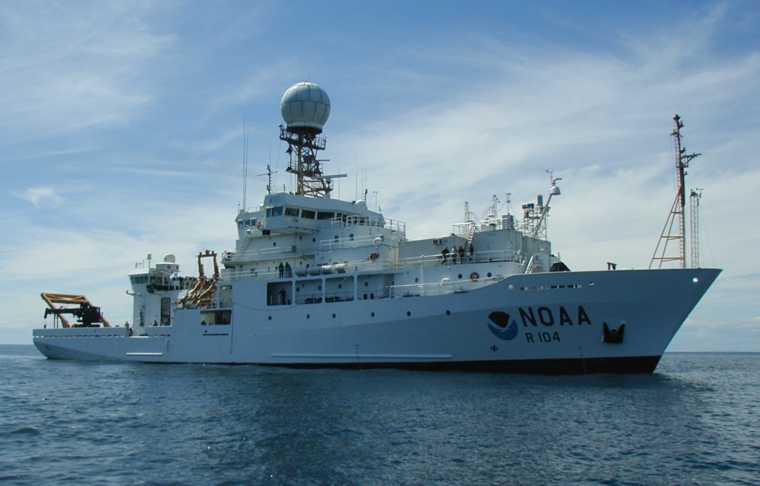
NOAAS Ronald H. Brown (R 104)

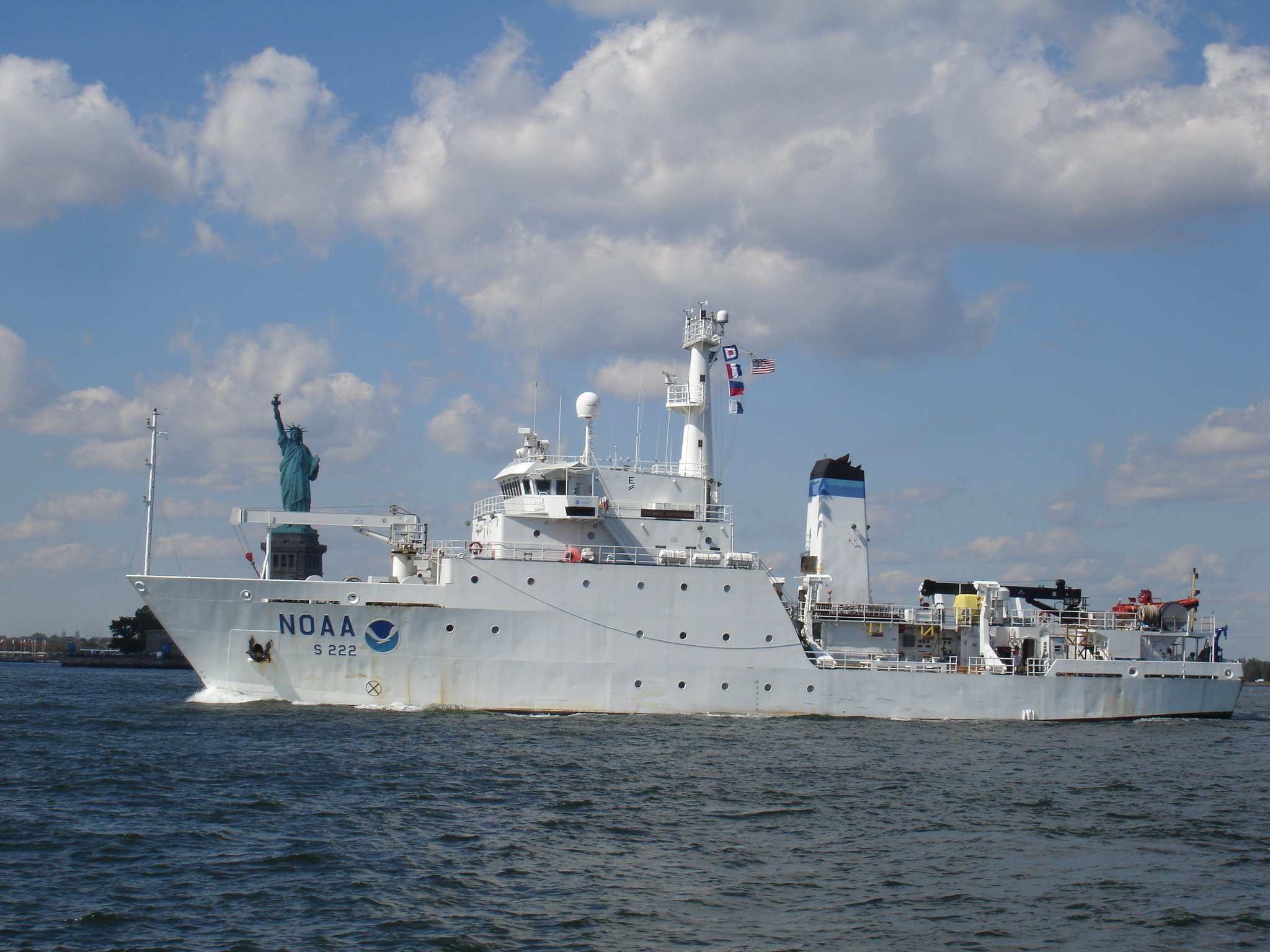
NOAAS Thomas Jefferson (S 222)

==== Past Fleet ====
- NOAAS Albatross IV (R 342) (in service 1970–2008; previously with U.S. Fish and Wildlife Service's Bureau of Commercial Fisheries 1963–1970)
- NOAAS Chapman (R 446) (in service 1980–1998)
- NOAAS David Starr Jordan (R 444) (in service 1970–2010; previously with U.S. Fish and Wildlife Service's Bureau of Commercial Fisheries 1966–1970)
- NOAAS Davidson (S 331) (in service 1970–1989; previously with U.S. Coast and Geodetic Survey 1967–1970)
- NOAAS Delaware II (R 445) (in service 1970–2012; previously with U.S. Fish and Wildlife Service's Bureau of Commercial Fisheries 1968-1970)
- NOAAS Discoverer (R 102) (in service 1970–1996; previously with U.S. Coast and Geodetic Survey 1967–1970)
- NOAAS Ferrel (S 492) (in service 1970–2002; previously with U.S. Coast and Geodetic Survey 1968–1970)
- NOAAS George B. Kelez (R 441) (in service 1970–1980; previously with U.S. Army 1944–1950, U.S. Navy 1950–1961, and U.S. Fish and Wildlife Service's Bureau of Commercial Fisheries 1962–1970)
- NOAAS Heck (S 591) (in service 1970–1995; previously with U.S. Coast and Geodetic Survey 1967–1970)
- NOAAS Hi'ialakai (R 334) (in service 2004–2020; previously with U.S. Navy as USNS Vindicator (T-AGOS-3) 1984–1993 and with U.S. Coast Guard as USCGC Vindicator (WMEC-3) 1994–2001)
- NOAAS John N. Cobb (R 552) (in service 1970–2008; previously with Fish and Wildlife Service 1950–1956 and U.S. Fish and Wildlife Service's Bureau of Commercial Fisheries 1956–1970)
- NOAAS Ka'imimoana (R 333) (in service 1996–2014; previously with U.S. Navy as USNS Titan (T-AGOS-15) 1988–1993)
- NOAAS Malcolm Baldrige (R 103), see NOAAS Researcher (R 103)
- NOAAS McArthur (S 330) (in service 1970–2003; previously with U.S. Coast and Geodetic Survey 1966–1970)
- NOAAS McArthur II (R 330) (in service 2003–2014; previously with U.S. Navy as USNS Indomitable (T-AGOS-7) 1985–2002)
- NOAAS Miller Freeman (R 223) (in service 1975-2013; previously with U.S. Fish and Wildlife Service's Bureau of Commercial Fisheries 1967-1970)
- NOAAS Mount Mitchell (S 222) (in service 1970-1995; previously with U.S. Coast and Geodetic Survey 1968-1970)
- NOAAS Murre II (R 663) (in service 1970-1989; previously with U.S. Army 1943–1949 and Fish and Wildlife Service 1949–1970)
- NOAAS Oceanographer (R 101) (in service 1970–1981, 1986–1989, and ?–1996; previously with U.S. Coast and Geodetic Survey 1966–1970)
- NOAAS Oregon (R 551) (in service 1970–1980; previously with Fish and Wildlife Service 1950–1956 and U.S. Fish and Wildlife Service's Bureau of Commercial Fisheries 1956–1970)
- NOAAS Peirce (S 328) (in service 1970–1992; previously with U.S. Coast and Geodetic Survey 1963–1970)
- MV Pribilof (in service with NOAA's National Marine Fisheries Service 1970–1975; previously with U.S. Fish and Wildlife Service's Bureau of Commercial Fisheries 1963–1970)
- NOAAS Researcher (R 103), renamed NOAAS Malcolm Baldrige (R 103) in 1988 (in service 1970–1996; previously with U.S. Coast and Geodetic Survey in 1970)
- NOAAS Rude (S 590) (in service 1970–2008; previously with U.S. Coast and Geodetic Survey 1967–1970)
- NOAAS Surveyor (S 132) (in service 1970–1995 or 1996; previously with U.S. Coast and Geodetic Survey 1960–1970)
- NOAAS Townsend Cromwell (R 443) (in service 1975–2002; previously with U.S. Fish and Wildlife Service's Bureau of Commercial Fisheries 1964–1975)
- NOAAS Whiting (S 329) (in service 1970–2003; previously with U.S. Coast and Geodetic Survey 1963–1970)

=== Maritime flags and pennants ===
The NOAA flag, flown by commissioned NOAA ships as a distinctive mark.

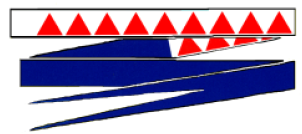
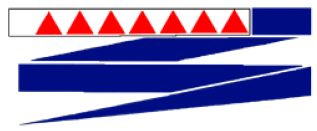
National Oceanic and Atmospheric Administration commission pennants for Class I vessels (top) and for Class II, III, and IV vessels (bottom).

NOAA ships fly the flag of the United States as their ensign. To distinguish them from ships of other United States Government agencies and services that also fly the U.S. flag as their ensign, NOAA ships also fly the NOAA flag as a distinctive mark. This practice carries on the tradition of the U.S. Coast and Geodetic Survey, whose ships flew the Coast and Geodetic Survey flag as a distinctive mark from 1899 until 1970, when the Coast and Geodetic Survey was abolished and its ships were incorporated into the NOAA fleet. The Coast and Geodetic Survey flag included a red triangle to represent the discipline of triangulation used in hydrographic surveys, and the flag of NOAA, in use since 1970, includes a similar red triangle.

NOAA ships also fly a "commission pennant" in a similar manner to U.S. Navy and United States Coast Guard ships. The NOAA fleet has three commission pennants, one for its largest ships (which it deems "Class I" vessels), and two for smaller ships NOAA defines as "Class II," "Class III," or "Class IV" vessels. The pennant for Class I vessels is 15 feet (4.6 m) long and has 13 red triangles on a white background at the hoist, with the remainder of the pennant blue, while the pennants for Class II, III, and IV vessels are 9 and 4 feet (2.7 and 1.2 m) long and have seven red triangles but otherwise are identical in design to the Class I pennant. The pennants also carry forward a tradition of the U.S. Coast and Geodetic Survey fleet, which flew commission pennants identical to those of the NOAA fleet.
