= NOAAS Murre II =

American research vessel

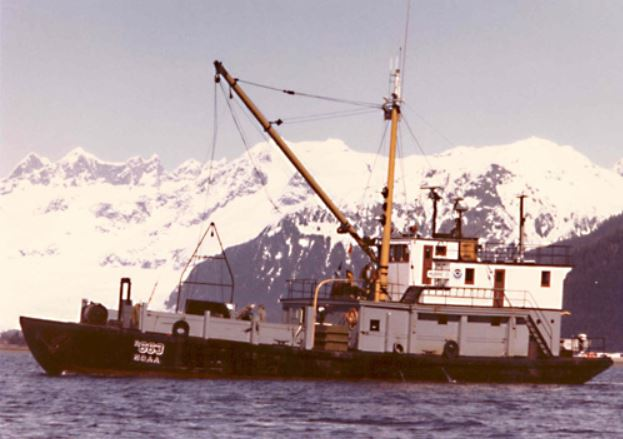
- NOAAS Murre II

History

United States Army
- Name: BSP-1915
- Builder: Maritime Shipyards, United States Army Corps of Engineers, Seattle, Washington
- Launched: 1943
- Fate: Transferred to U.S. Fish and Wildlife Service 14 May 1949

United States Fish and Wildlife Service
- Name: US FWS Murre II
- Namesake: USFS Murre, a U.S. Bureau of Fisheries and Fish and Wildlife Service vessel in commission from 1917 to 1942
- Acquired: Transferred from United States Army 14 May 1949
- Home port: Juneau, Alaska
- Fate: Transferred to National Oceanic and Atmospheric Administration 3 October 1970

National Oceanic and Atmospheric Administration
- Name: NOAAS Murre II (FRV 63)
- Namesake: Previous name retained
- Acquired: Transferred from United States Fish and Wildlife Service 3 October 1970
- Decommissioned: 1989
- Reclassified: From "fisheries research vessel" (FRV 63) to "research ship" (R 663)
- Home port: Juneau, Alaska
- Fate: Sold 1991

General characteristics
- Type: Fisheries research ship
- Tonnage: 95 NT
- Length: 86 ft (26 m)
- Beam: 24 ft (7.3 m)
- Draft: 7.5 ft (2.3 m)
- Propulsion: Twin 115-hp (86-kw) Caterpillar diesel engines
- Speed: 8 knots (15 km/h) (average)
- Range: 2,500 nautical miles (4,600 km)

NOAAS Murre II (R 663), previously NOAAS Murre II (FRV 63), was an American research vessel in commission in the National Oceanic and Atmospheric Administration (NOAA) fleet from 1970 to 1989. Prior to her NOAA career, she operated under the United States Department of the Interior′s Fish and Wildlife Service from 1949 to 1956 and under the United States Fish and Wildlife Service′s Bureau of Commercial Fisheries from 1956 to 1970 as US FWS Murre II.

The ship originally operated as a self-propelled barge, first as BSP-1915 for the United States Army during World War II and then for the Fish and Wildlife Service before undergoing conversion into a research ship in 1963.

== Construction ==
The Maritime Shipyards of the United States Army Corps of Engineers built the vessel at Seattle, Washington. She was launched in 1943.

== Service history ==
=== U.S. Army ===
Upon completion, the vessel entered United States Army service as the self-propelled barge BSP-1915 during World War II. She operated in the Aleutian Islands, hauling passengers, mail, fuel, and freight.

=== Fish and Wildlife Service ===
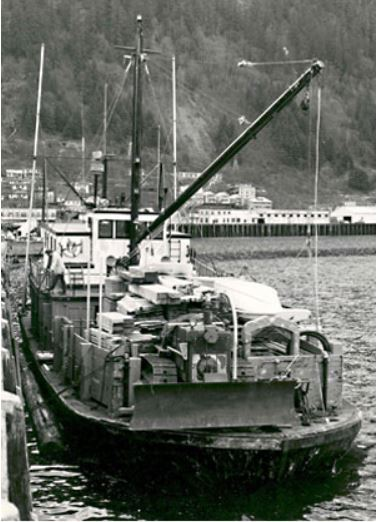
Murre II operating as a self-propelled barge, loaded with lumber and a bulldozer

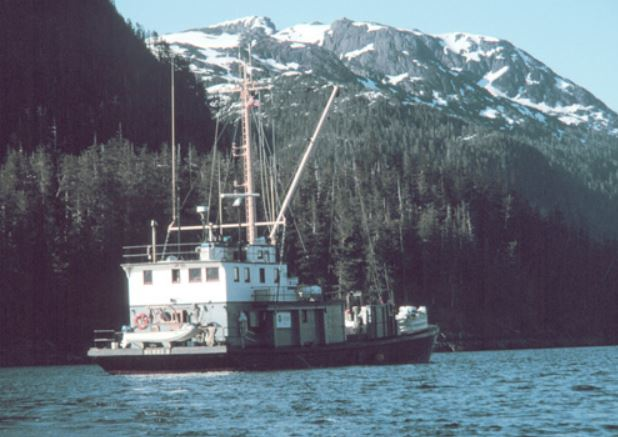
Starboard quarter view of Murre II

On 14 May 1949, the U.S. Army transferred BSP-1915 to the United States Department of the Interior′s Fish and Wildlife Service (FWS) at Kodiak, Alaska. The FWS renamed the barge US FWS Murre II and assigned her Juneau, Alaska, as her home port. The FWS continued to operate her as a self-propelled barge, using her to haul cargo and personnel to stream watchmen at stream guard camps and to the FWS field station at Little Port Walter in Port Walter, Alaska. She also served as a floating base for FWS surveillance aircraft and their crews. In 1956, the Fish and Wildlife Service underwent a major reorganization in which it was renamed the United States Fish and Wildlife Service (USFWS) and its ocean-going ships like Murre II were consolidated under USFWS's new Bureau of Commercial Fisheries (BCF). Later that year, on 11 November 1956, Murre II suffered minor damage due to a blow-back in her engine room furnace which caused an explosion and fire.

As late as 1963, only cursory oceanographic studies of the waters of Southeast Alaska existed. Murre II's shallow draft made her ideal for operating in the region's shallow waters, and in that year the USFWS installed research equipment aboard her to address shortfalls in understanding of the oceanography of Southeast Alaska. In her first assignment in her new role as a multipurpose oceanographic research vessel, Murre II conducted a preliminary survey of Auke Bay. As she continued her work, an estimated 80 percent of Southeast Alaska's first recorded identifications of marine zooplankton came from samples taken by scientists aboard Murre II. In May 1964 a crankshaft broke in one of Murre II's main engines, forcing her to cut short her monthly oceanography cruise – in which plans had called for her to conduct both an oceanographic survey of Traitor's Cove and midwater trawling operations – and return to port. Repairs took several months, during which the USFWS research vessel Heron took over her duties, but Murre II eventually returned to her oceanographic operations.

=== NOAA ===
On 3 October 1970, a major reorganization occurred which formed the National Oceanic and Atmospheric Administration (NOAA) under the United States Department of Commerce. As part of the reorganization, the Bureau of Commercial Fisheries was removed from the U.S. Fish and Wildlife Service and placed under NOAA, and ships of the Bureau of Commercial Fisheries fleet joined those of the United States Coast and Geodetic Survey in forming the new NOAA fleet. At first, the major ships that were to constitute the new fleet reported to separate entities, with former Coast and Geodetic Survey ships subordinate to the National Ocean Survey (the Coast and Geodetic Survey′s successor organization within NOAA), while former BCF ships reported to the BCF's successor within NOAA, the National Marine Fisheries Service. Via a phased process during 1972 and 1973, however, the major ships of the National Ocean Survey and National Marine Fisheries Service, as well as those of the Environmental Research Laboratories, integrated to form a consolidated and unified NOAA fleet, operated and maintained by the National Ocean Survey′s Office of Fleet Operations. With the creation of NOAA, Murre II initially became NOAAS Murre II (FRV 63) and later was redesignated NOAAS Murre II (R 663), but rather than transfer to the consolidated NOAA fleet during 1972 or 1973 she continued to be operated and maintained directly by the NMFS′s Auke Bay Laboratory until 1987.

After the creation of NOAA, Murre II continued her oceanographic activities. In 1972, she supported the NMFS's Marine Resources Monitoring, Assessment, and Prediction (MARMAP) program. In August 1975 she made the first cruise to acquire information on the abundance and distribution of humpback whales in Southeast Alaska. In 1977, she supported a study of the effects of logging on the Porcupine Creek area. In 1977 and 1978, she took part in a long-term study of undisturbed estuarine systems by supporting investigations of the benthic populations of Steamer Bay, and she conducted trawl surveys of the distribution of Alaska pollock, also known as walleye pollock, in nursery areas in Stephens Pass and Tenakee Inlet in 1978 and 1981. In 1981, she also returned to Porcupine Creek to continue her support of the study of the effects of logging on the area. As part of "Plankton Watch 1982" – a cooperative program of the Alaska Department of Fish and Game, Juneau-area nonprofit private fish hatcheries, and Auke Bay Laboratory – she monitored plankton in Auke Bay weekly during 1982. She also conducted many surveys of pink salmon and chum salmon and carried out oceanographic and plankton sampling in many parts of Southeast Alaska during the 1970s and 1980s. During the 1980s, she served as the base of operations for research activities such as the autumn collection of Pacific ocean perch in Southeast Alaska, and in the mid-1980s she took part in United States–Canada transboundary Pacific salmon studies in the Boca de Quadra area of Southeast Alaska.

In 1987, NOAA finally transferred the operation and maintenance of Murre II to the NOAA fleet. She was decommissioned in 1989 and sold in 1991.

According to NOAA, many Auke Bay Laboratory scientists described Murre II as "the ideal vessel for Southeast Alaska coastal operations – supporting research efforts and moving people and supplies when and where needed," and she had completed "35 years of distinguished service supporting fisheries research in Southeast Alaska waters" at the time of her decommissioning. She also proved seaworthy, surviving various encounters with severe weather; on one occasion, while returning from a research project, she encountered a storm in the Gulf of Alaska that ripped some of the wood sheathing off her hull, but the nails securing the wood to the hull remained in place and only a few of her above-water cargo bulkheads suffered damage.

=== Later career ===
After NOAA sold her, Murre II eventually became the property of a community college in Poulsbo, Washington, which used her on Puget Sound as a training vessel for scallop draggers.

== See also ==
- NOAA ships and aircraft
