= NOAAS George B. Kelez =

American research vessel

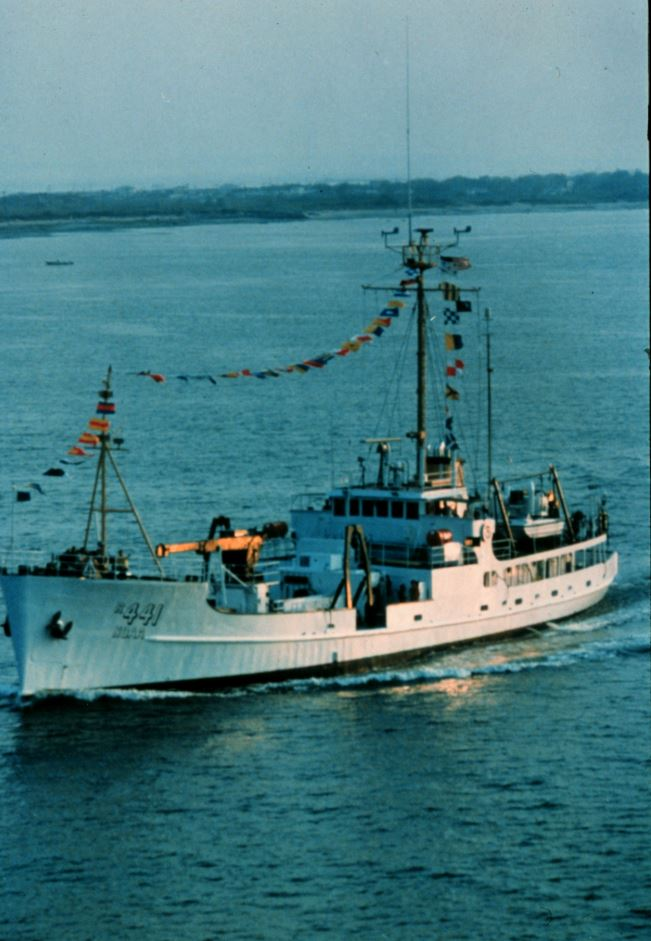
- NOAAS George B. Kelez (R 441) dressed overall.

History

United States Army
- Name: FS-400
- Builder: Ingalls Shipbuilding, Decatur, Alabama
- Launched: 1944
- Fate: Transferred to United States Navy 1 July 1950
- Notes: United States Army Transport in U.S. Army Transportation Corps service

United States Navy
- Name: USNS AKL-30
- Acquired: 1 July 1950
- Stricken: 1961
- Identification: T-AKL-30
- Fate: Transferred to United States Fish and Wildlife Service 1962
- Notes: In non-commissioned service in U.S. Navy Military Sea Transportation Service

United States Fish and Wildlife Service
- Name: George B. Kelez
- Namesake: George Bothwell Kelez (1908–1954), pioneering fisheries scientist in Alaska
- Acquired: Transferred from United States Navy early 1962
- Commissioned: 20 July 1962
- Fate: Transferred to National Oceanic and Atmospheric Administration 3 October 1970

National Oceanic and Atmospheric Administration
- Acquired: Transferred from United States Fish and Wildlife Service 3 October 1970
- Decommissioned: late 1972
- Identification: CRS 41
- Recommissioned: March 1973
- Decommissioned: January 1980
- Reclassified: From "coastal research ship" (CRS 41) to "research ship" (R 441)
- Identification: IMO number: 8942759; MMSI number: 367163370; Callsign: WDD5770
- Fate: Sold 1982
- Status: Extant in commercial service 2016
- Notes: Reported to National Marine Fisheries Service 1970–1972; became part of consolidated NOAA fleet in 1972

General characteristics
- Type: Fisheries research ship
- Tonnage: 550 GT; 216 NT
- Length: 177.5 ft (54.1 m)
- Beam: 32 ft (9.8 m)
- Draft: 10 ft (3.0 m)
- Installed power: 900 bhp (670 kW)
- Propulsion: General Motors engine,
- Speed: 10.5 knots (19 km/h) (average)
- Range: 7,300 nautical miles (13,500 km)

NOAAS George B. Kelez (R 441), previously NOAAS George B. Kelez (CRS 41), was an American research vessel in commission in the National Oceanic and Atmospheric Administration (NOAA) fleet from 1972 to 1980. Prior to her NOAA career, she operated under the United States Fish and Wildlife Service′s Bureau of Commercial Fisheries from 1962 to 1970 as US FWS George B. Kelez and the National Marine Fisheries Service from 1970 to 1972 as NOAAS George B. Kelez (CRS 41).

Before becoming a research vessel, the ship was the United States Army freight and supply vessel U.S. Army FS-400 from 1944 to 1950. On transfer to the Navy the vessel was classified as a "light cargo ship" for the United States Navy′s Military Sea Transportation Service as USNS AKL-30 (T-AKL-30) from 1950 to 1961.

== Construction ==
The ship was built as a U.S. Army freight and supply vessel, Design 381 (officially Vessel, Supply, Diesel, Steel, 177') also called coastal cargo ships. The type was built by several shipbuilders during World War II with FS-400 being the last of a series of the design built by Ingalls Shipbuilding, Decatur, Alabama, in 1944. (Note: Design 381 included FS-253 through FS-554 with a number cancelled late in the war. Ingalls built FS-383 — FS-386 and FS-394 — FS-400 with 401—403 cancelled. The majority of the type, FS-253 — FS-292, were built by Wheeler Shipbuilding, Whitestone, N.Y. with nine other builders also building the type.) NOAA history, primarily concerned with the NOAA operation of the vessel, has design by Sturgeon Bay Shipbuilding and Drydock Company of Wisconsin with Nickum & Sons Consultants of Seattle, Washington but the designs were of U.S. Army origin according to other references. (Note: The NOAA history reference, which also has the Navy designation confused with the original Army designation, is contradicted by other sources regarding the Army design vessels.)

== Service history ==
=== U.S. Army and U.S. Navy ===
FS-400, was placed in service with the United States Army Transportation Corps during World War II with a United States Coast Guard crew. The ship operated in the Central Pacific Area calling at ports such as Noumea, Guadalcanal, and, after the end of the war, Wake Island.

On 1 July 1950, she was transferred from the U.S. Army Transportation Corps to the United States Navy′s Military Sea Transportation Service, entering noncommissioned service in the U.S. Navy as USNS AKL-30 (T-AKL-30). She was stricken from the Naval Register in 1961 and declared excess property at Mare Island Naval Shipyard in Mare Island, California, during the summer of 1961.

=== U.S. Fish and Wildlife Service ===
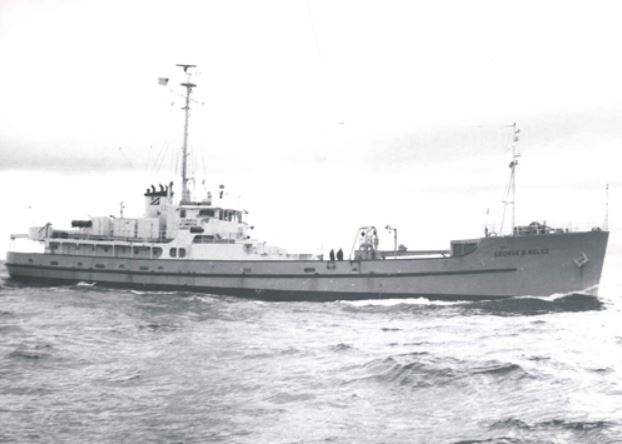
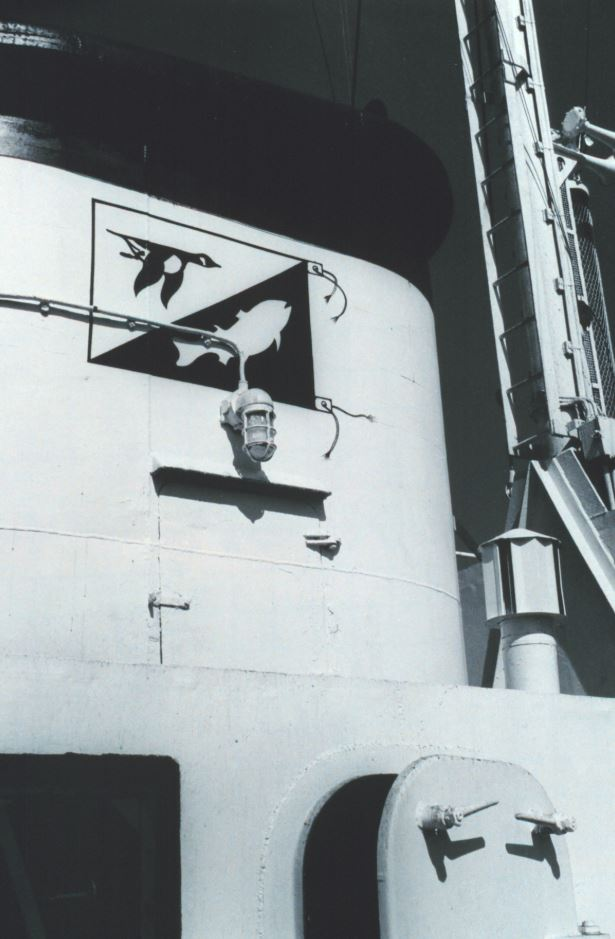
LEFT: US FWS George B. Kelez underway in 1963 while with the U.S. Fish and Wildlife Service′s Bureau of Commercial Fisheries. RIGHT: The U.S. Fish and Wildlife Service logo on US FWS George B. Kelez′s stack in 1963.

In late 1961, the United States Fish and Wildlife Service (USFWS), an agency of the United States Department of the Interior, inspected AKL-30. The USFWS acquired her in 1962 for use as a fisheries research vessel, and in February 1962 towed her from Mare Island to Seattle, Washington, where she underwent conversion into a fisheries research ship over the next four and a half months at a cost of approximately US$100,000. Her USFWS crew did most of the conversion work, purchasing and installing new equipment such as fishing equipment, oceanographic equipment, and specialized electrical and refrigeration systems and modifying the captain's and crew's quarters.

When her conversion was complete, the ship – now named US FWS George B. Kelez – was commissioned in a ceremony at Seattle on 20 July 1962 attended by Kelez's mother and brother. Kelez, a fisheries scientist who was the Assistant Fisheries Administrator for the Territory of Alaska, was one of five Fish and Wildlife Service employees who died on duty in the crash of a Grumman Goose amphibious aircraft in Alaska on 1 September 1954, and the ship carried a plaque – read aloud at the ceremony – that read:

United States Bureau of Commercial Fisheries Motor Ship George B. Kelez

To inspire those who man her and those who follow her course in the great international seas, this research ship is hereby dedicated to the honor of George B. Kelez, Fishery Research Biologist and Alaska Fishery Administrator of the U. S. Bureau of Fisheries and Fish and Wildlife Service from 1930 to 1954. This ship and her scientists will further the research ideals and objectives on the high seas and in Alaskan waters which motivated his entire career. Wherever this living ship goes, there goes also the spirit and faith of George B. Kelez, who dedicated his life to conservation of our fishery resources. We are proud of the name, proud of the vessel and proud of the crew. May our Lord protect and guide you.

Signed by Samuel J. Hutchinson, Regional Director, 20 July 1962.

Assigned to the USFWS's Bureau of Commercial Fisheries (BCF), George B. Kelez gave the BCF a new capability to conduct oceanographic and open-ocean salmon studies during the winter; previously, the BCF had relied on chartered vessels for such studies, but they were too small for safe winter operations in the open ocean and were limited to spring and summer operations. George B. Kelez also provided the BCF with adequate on-board laboratory space and storage space for gear and spare parts for the first time.

George B. Kelez's first cruise for the BCF – a six-week shakedown cruise in the Gulf of Alaska and off the Aleutian Islands – began in late July 1962. During the cruise, she conducted experimental salmon gillnetting. During the 1960s, she made several salmon-fishing cruises in Bristol Bay and other waters off Alaska in support of the BCF's Biological Laboratory. During the mid-1960s, she also participated in several experiments designed to determine ocean current flows, using drift bottles in the subarctic Pacific Ocean and oceanographic data-gathering buoys equipped with radio transmitters released in the Pacific Ocean 300 nautical miles (560 km; 350 mi) off the coast of Washington. In early 1966, she took part in the first winter oceanographic measurement of the Alaskan Stream – a current related closely to the formation of the salmon fishing ground – in the western subarctic region of the North Pacific.

=== NOAA ===
On 3 October 1970, a major reorganization occurred which formed the National Oceanic and Atmospheric Administration (NOAA) under the United States Department of Commerce. As part of the reorganization, the Bureau of Commercial Fisheries was removed from the U.S. Fish and Wildlife Service and placed under NOAA, and ships of the Bureau of Commercial Fisheries fleet joined those of the United States Coast and Geodetic Survey in forming the new NOAA fleet. At first, the major ships that were to constitute the new fleet reported to separate entities, with former Coast and Geodetic Survey ships subordinate to the National Ocean Survey (the Coast and Geodetic Survey's successor organization within NOAA), while former BCF ships like George B. Kelez reported to the BCF's successor within NOAA, the National Marine Fisheries Service. During 1972 and 1973, however, the ships of the National Ocean Survey and National Marine Fisheries Service, as well as those of the Environmental Research Laboratories, integrated to form a consolidated and unified NOAA fleet, operated by the National Ocean Survey's Office of Fleet Operations. George B. Kelez officially became part of the new NOAA fleet in 1972. As a NOAA ship, she at first was redesignated NOAAS George B. Kelez (CRS 41), later becoming NOAAS George B. Kelez (R 441).

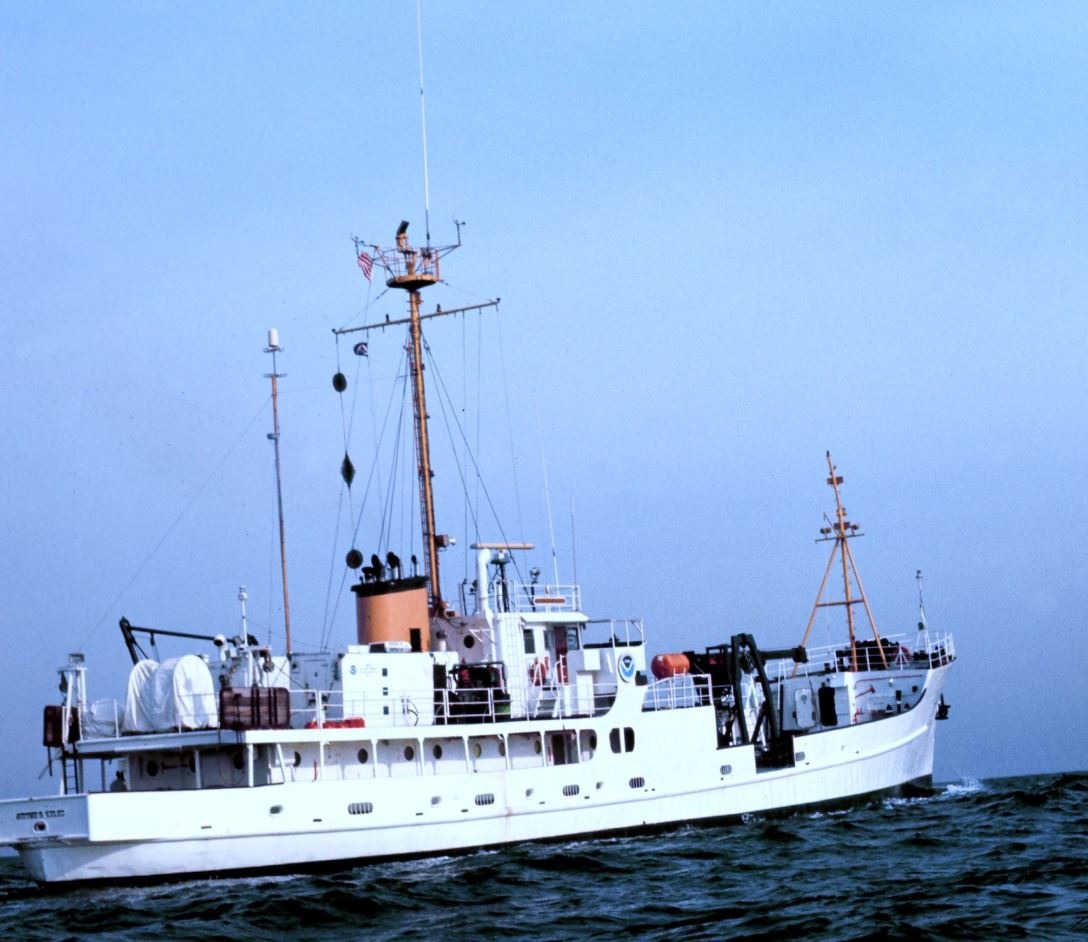
Starboard quarter view of NOAAS George B. Kelez

Meanwhile, George B. Kelez continued her operations. In the summer of 1971, she conducted a cruise in the North Pacific to collect salmon and sea trout samples which were later analyzed in genetic and maturity studies. In the autumn of 1971, she made a 21-day cruise off Washington and British Columbia to sample ichthyoplankton and zooplankton populations and conduct tests in the field of fishing gear, including net systems, on-board larvae-holding facilities, a seawater chemical concentration autoanalyzer, and a method of using computers to process salinity and water temperature data. She made a 39-day cruise off Southeast Alaska in early 1972 in which she tagged 2,400 sablefish. In the spring of 1972, she cruised for 22 days near Kodiak, Alaska, examining oceanographic and environmental conditions and testing the operation of shipboard data acquisition devices. Also that spring, she made a cruise in Puget Sound and in the Pacific Ocean off the coast of Washington to determine the suitable structure, towing speeds, and trajectories for zooplankton sampling gear known as a bongo net, which consists of paired plankton nets mounted side-by-side that a vessel tows horizontally through the water. In the summer of 1972, she made a cruise in the Gulf of Alaska to study the distribution and abundance of Pacific salmon.

NOAA had limited funding during its first three years of existence between 1970 and 1972, forcing it to reduce ship operations and oceanographic studies. This led NOAA to decommission George B. Kelez near the end of 1972, and she never returned to fisheries research work. However, in March 1973 NOAA recommissioned her and loaned her to the United States Geological Survey for use in Southern California. In late 1974, NOAA moved her to a new home port, NOAA's Atlantic Marine Center at Norfolk, Virginia, and on 6 December 1974 opened bids for repair work to the ship.

With her repairs completed, George B. Kelez returned to service, focusing on oceanographic research. She spent the years from 1976 to 1980 primarily operating in connection with the Marine Ecosystems Analysis (MESA) New York Bight Project, which used benthic sampling to monitor and research the short-term ecological effects of ocean dumping. During this time, she was assigned to the support of NOAA's Environmental Research Laboratories from 1976 to 1977 and to the support of NOAA's Office of Marine Pollution Assessment from 1978 to 1979. In January 1980, 35 scientists from 13 countries taking part in an intergovernmental project to gather oceanographic data on the effects of common pollutants conducted open-ocean sampling aboard George B. Kelez in the North Atlantic Ocean off Bermuda. NOAA decommissioned her by the end of January 1980 and eventually put her up for sale.

=== Later career ===
In April 1982 the Seafarers Harry Lundeberg School of Seamanship of Brooklyn, New York, purchased the ship and renamed her MV Earl "Bull" Shepard. The school, which moved to Piney Point, Maryland, in 1991 and simultaneously renamed itself the Paul Hall Center for Maritime Training and Education, used her until February 1994, when it sold her to foreign buyers, who renamed her MV Croyance. She was renamed MV Rest Express in 1997, MV Mon Repos in 1998, and MV Monrepos Express. In 1999, she again was named MV Croyance. In 2005, Croyance was spotted tied up in a rusty condition at Moss Point, Mississippi, bearing a port of registry of San Lorenzo, Honduras. In 2006, the Omega Protein Corporation of Reedville, Virginia, acquired her, registered her in the United States, renovated her for use as a menhaden fishing vessel, and renamed her MV Smuggler's Point. As of 2016, Smuggler's Point remained in commercial service.

== See also ==
- NOAA ships and aircraft
