= Thermosalinograph =

The Thermosalinograph or TSG is an measuring instrument mounted near the water intake of ships to continuously measure sea surface temperature and conductivity while the ship is in motion. Various programs have been developed to assist in the collection and analysis of data from a TSG. The data can be used to calculate salinity, density, sound velocity within the water, and other parameters. There are various types of thermosalinographs available on the market today.

== Programs collecting TSG data ==
NOAA fleet
Ship of Opportunity Program (SOOP)
Global Ocean Observing System (GOOS)
GOSUD Global Ocean Surface Underway Data (http://www.gosud.org)

== Measurement devices ==
The thermosalinograph uses a conductivity cell to measure conductivity, which can then be translated into a value of salinity. Also a thermistor cell measures the temperature of the surface water, which when combined with the conductivity can be used calculate the density of the water and the sound velocity within it.

== Types ==
Model	Applications
SBE 21 SeaCAT Thermosalinograph	real-time sea surface temperature and conductivity
SBE 45 MicroTSG (Thermosalinograph)	shipboard determination of sea surface (pumped-water) conductivity, temperature, salinity, and sound velocity

== Sources of error ==
Water is measured in the engine room, which can cause biases from heat in the room.
