= Scientific echosounder =

Device using sonar for underwater measurements

A scientific echosounder is a device which uses sonar technology for the calibrated backscatter measurement of underwater physical and biological components—this device is also known as scientific sonar. Applications include bathymetry, substrate classification, studies of aquatic vegetation, fish, and plankton, and differentation of water masses.

== Technology ==
Scientific echosounder equipment is built to exacting standards and tested to be stable and reliable in the transmission and receiving of sound energy under the water. Recent advances have led to the development of the digital scientific echosounder, further enhancing the reliability and precision with which these systems operate. Modern scientific echosounders are reliable, portable, and relatively easy to use.

Collected acoustic data is "stamped" with geographic information for precise positional information (coordinates and time). This enables analysis and incorporation of the results into a Geographic Information System (GIS) for further analysis, correlation with other variables, mapping, and display.

Currently, the only three manufacturers of scientific-quality digital echosounders commonly used for resource assessment are BioSonics, HTI (Hydroacoustic Technology, Inc.) and Simrad. Other specialty manufacturers of scientific quality echosounders exist.

Features of modern digital scientific echosounder technology include:

- Low side-lobe transducers
- Simple data collection
- Low system noise
- Wide dynamic range
- High system stability
- High accuracy
- Easy system expansion
- Multiplexing systems (multiple transducers can operate simultaneously on the same system)

== Scientific software for analysis of hydroacoustic data ==
Specially written software is available for analysis of hydroacoustic data for assessment of underwater physical and biological characteristics. "Fish" here can apply to any "target" in the water column, e.g., fish, plankton, squid, mammal. All results can be imported into a GIS for additional analysis, correlation with other variables, mapping, and display.

Bathymetry
the depth (range) of the bottom of the river, lake, or ocean below the transducer.
Range
the distance between the transducer and the "target" (fish, zooplankton, vegetation, bottom). This is determined by precise timing from sound generation to sound reception (by the transducer).
Bottom type; Seabed type; Substrate type; or Sediment type
can be assessed and classified (e.g., sand, rock, soft mud, hard mud).
Fish quantity
can be estimated and reported as numbers of fish or biomass.
Fish size
can be determined in a relative manner, based on acoustic "target size".
Fish behavior
can be assessed through a combination of instantaneous and temporal measures and observations. Spatial distribution, size distributions, diurnal activity, predator-prey relationships, migration rates, temporal activity, etc. can be observed and quantified.
Submersed aquatic vegetation; Submerged aquatic vegetation; or SAV
can be detected and assessed for location, density, and height.
Fish passage
can be quantified for fish movement past a fixed-location hydroacoustic monitoring system. Examples include: Migrating salmon or fish entrained by water intakes.

Data collected with a scientific echosounder can be analyzed for the presence, abundance, distribution and acoustic characteristics of such variables as: depth (bathymetry), bottom substrate class (e.g., sand, mud, rock), submersed aquatic vegetation (SAV), and water column scattering (fish and plankton). Resulting analysis can be used to generate GIS data layers for these variables.

== Applications ==
Scientific echosounders are commonly used by International, Federal, State and Local government and management agencies, as well as private-sector consultants working for these public agencies. Academic institutions have realized and are teaching the value of sampling non-invasively with sound to enhance both the spatial coverage and objectivity of fisheries sampling. Fisheries management agencies such as the membership of ICES and the United States National Marine Fisheries Service (NMFS) commonly use scientific sonar for stock assessment purposes, such as herring biomass assessment for resource management purposes.

More recently, the acoustic data collected has been valuable in underwater habitat assessment and classification for the variables; seabed type (e.g. rock, mud, sand) and submersed aquatic vegetation and algae - with the appropriate software.

== See also ==
- Echo sounding – Measuring the depth of water by transmitting sound waves into water and timing the return
- Fishfinder – Sonar instrument used to detect aquatic animals and the bottom and measure their depth
- Hydroacoustics – Study of the propagation of sound in water
- Sonar – Acoustic sensing method
- Underwater acoustics – Study of the propagation of sound in water
