= Nygren =

Nygren is a surname. Notable people with the surname include:

- Anders Nygren (1890–1978), Swedish Lutheran theologian
- Benjamin Nygren (born 2001), Swedish footballer
- Bud Nygren (1918–1984), American football player and coach
- Buu Nygren (born 1986), 10th President of the Navajo Nation
- Carl S. Nygren (1873–1941), American farmer and politician
- David R. Nygren (born 1938), American particle physicist, inventor of the Time projection chamber
- Erik Nygren (1923–1999), Swedish Air Force major general
- Harley D. Nygren (1924–2019), American admiral and engineer, first Director of the National Oceanic and Atmospheric Administration Commissioned Officer Corps
- Hildur Nygren (1896–1962), Swedish teacher and politician
- Jan Nygren (1934–2019), Swedish actor
- John Nygren (born 1964), American insurance and financial services agent and Republican politician
- Magnus Nygren (born 1990), Swedish ice hockey defenceman
- Nicklas Nygren (born 1983), Swedish video game developer
- Nils Nygren (fl. 1920s), American soccer player
- Olle Nygren (born 1929), Swedish international speedway rider
- Oscar Nygren (1872–1960), Swedish Army general
- Wollert Nygren (1906–1988), Norwegian Olympic speed skater

== See also ==
- Mount Nygren, a mountain in Antarctica
- Negreni (disambiguation)
- Nygren Point, a point on James Ross Island, Antarctica
- Nygrenda, village in Norway
- Nygränd, street in Stockholm
