= Harley D. Nygren =

Former NOAA Corps Director

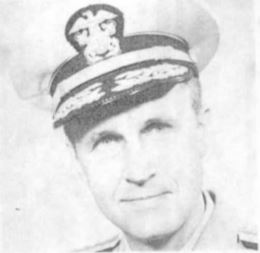
- Born: Harley Dean Nygren; December 12, 1924; Seattle, Washington, US
- Died: November 17, 2019 (aged 94)
- Burial place: Indiantown Gap National Cemetery, Annville, Pennsylvania, US
- Military career
- Branch: United States Naval Reserve (1942–1947); United States Coast and Geodetic Survey Corps (1948–1965); Environmental Science Services Administration Corps (1965–1970); NOAA Commissioned Officer Corps (1970–1981)
- Rank: Rear Admiral
- Commands: USC&GS Surveyor (OSS 32); NOAA Commissioned Officer Corps
- Conflicts: World War II; Cold War
- Awards: Department of Commerce Gold Medal (1975); Department of Commerce Bronze Medal; Karo Award (1961); NOAA Unit Citation Award

Rear Admiral Harley Dean Nygren (December 12, 1924 – November 17, 2019) was an American military officer who served in the United States Coast and Geodetic Survey Corps, its successor, the Environmental Science Services Administration Corps (ESSA Corps), and the ESSA Corps's successor, the National Oceanic and Atmospheric Administration Commissioned Officer Corps (NOAA Corps). He served as the first Director of the NOAA Corps.

During his career, Nygren served on numerous geodetic field parties and aboard survey ships of the Coast and Geodetic Survey fleet, seeing service as far north as the Arctic and as far south as Antarctica. He also participated in many of the negotiations that resulted in the creation of the Environmental Science Services Administration (ESSA) and its successor, the National Oceanic and Atmospheric Administration.

== Early life ==
Harley D. Nygren was born in Seattle, Washington in 1924. He began his career in the United States Government as a laborer in a United States Army warehouse.

== United States Naval Reserve ==
The United States entered World War II as a result of the Japanese attack on Pearl Harbor on 7 December 1941, and Nygren enlisted in the United States Naval Reserve in 1942 at the age of 17. The Naval Reserve made him a seaman apprentice and assigned him to the Navy College Training Program. As a participant in the program, he attended the University of Washington, from which he graduated in 1945 with a Bachelor of Science degree. Upon graduation, he was commissioned as an ensign in the Naval Reserve.

Nygren served as damage control officer aboard the destroyer USS Hughes (DD-410) in 1946 as she was prepared for use as a target in the Operation Crossroads atomic bomb tests at Bikini Atoll later that year. He then returned to Seattle, where he was assigned to the Submarine Battalion of the Organized Reserve while he spent a year pursuing a Bachelor of Science degree in mechanical engineering at the University of Washington. He received the degree in 1947.

== Coast and Geodetic Survey Corps, ESSA Corps, and NOAA Corps career ==
=== Coast and Geodetic Survey Corps ===
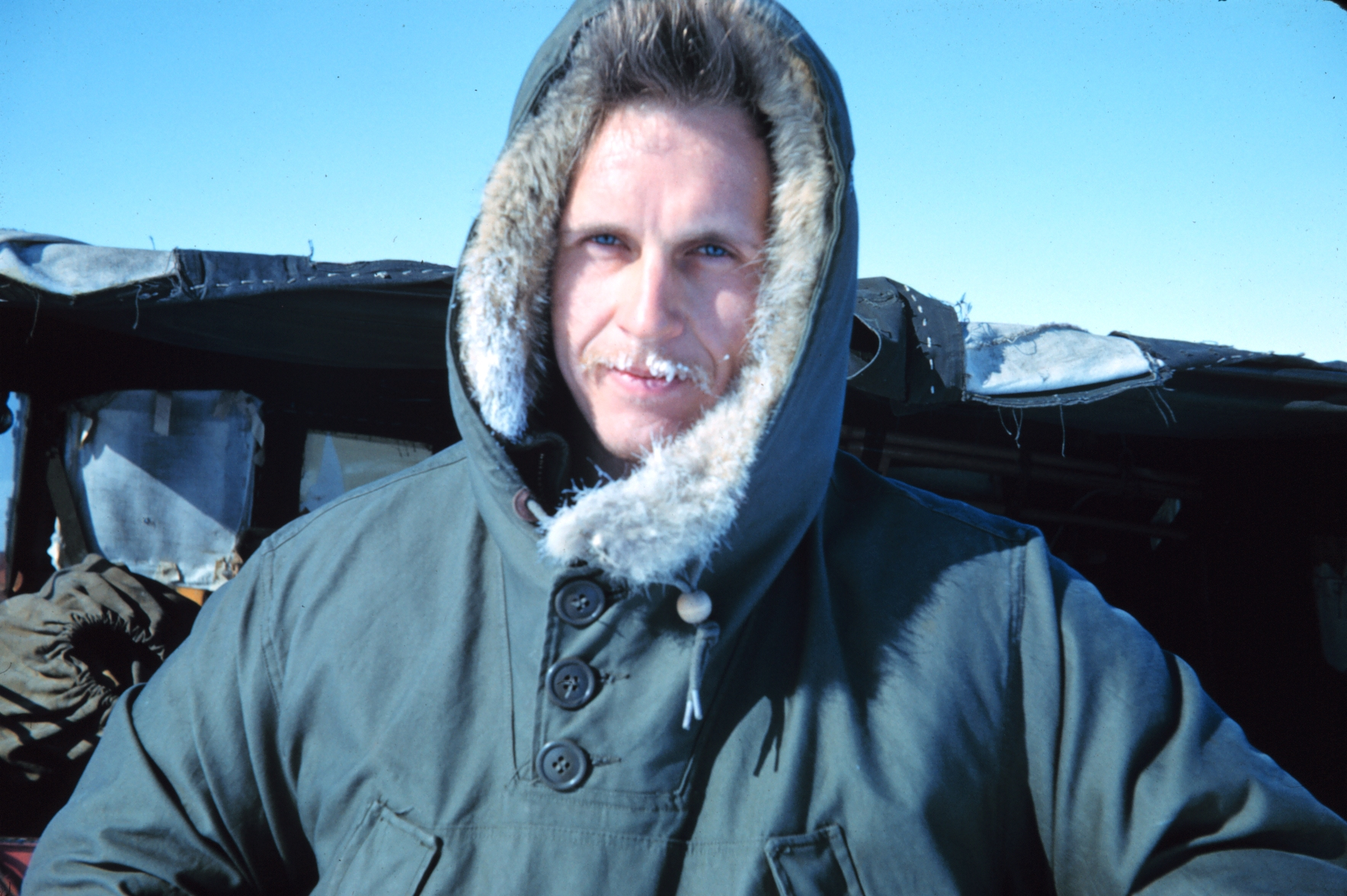
Nygren's photograph of himself while working with a U.S. Coast and Geodetic Survey field party on the Alaska North Slope in the winter of 1950.

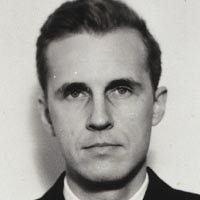
Nygren as a junior officer aboard the U.S. Coast and Geodetic Survey ocean survey ship USC&GS Pathfinder (OSS 30) in 1953.

Leaving the Naval Reserve, Nygren began his career in the United States Coast and Geodetic Survey in September 1947 as a civilian deck officer. He received training as an astronomic observer in 1948, and that year was commissioned as an ensign in the United States Coast and Geodetic Survey Corps. In early 1948 he was assigned to the ocean survey ship USC&GS Explorer (OSS 28) and spent six months on surveying activity in the Aleutian Islands, including significant time ashore on Kiska and on Rat Island. In 1949, he was assigned to the Coast and Geodetic Survey's Arctic Field Party, and spent February or March to September of each year from 1949 to 1951 operating in the Territory of Alaska surveying the Alaska North Slope. Surveying the coastline and the offshore area from Point Lay to Barter Island, the field party made the first accurate survey of the North Slope area. As a lieutenant (junior grade), Nygren used this newfound knowledge to serve as a maritime pilot for a convoy of United States Navy tank landing ships (LSTs) as it voyaged along the Alaska North Slope.

Leaving the Arctic Field Party in 1952, Nygren became executive officer of the Coast and Geodetic Survey coastal survey ship USC&GS Hodgson (CSS 26), operating in Oregon's Depoe Bay and Washington's Puget Sound. In 1953, he transferred to the ocean survey ship USC&GS Pathfinder (OSS 30), conducting hydrographic surveys in the western Aleutian Islands, Bering Sea, and Cook Inlet. By the end of 1953 he was Pathfinder's operations officer.

In 1954, Nygren left Pathfinder for over three years of duty as head of a Coast and Geodetic Survey Division of Geodesy field party measuring the acceleration of gravity. The project took him to the Midwestern United States for work similar to geophysical surveys and elsewhere in the world to establish gravity base stations. In 1957, he was assigned to a second tour aboard Explorer, but before she sailed he was transferred to Pathfinder as operations officer. During his tour, Pathfinder operated in the Bering Sea, in Cook Inlet, in the Seward, Alaska, area, and along the coast of Southeast Alaska. He transferred off Pathfinder in 1960 and attended the University of Washington for a year, completing a course in oceanography and making a research trip aboard the university's research ship Brown Bear that took him as far north as the Arctic Ocean off Point Barrow, Alaska. After completing the course, he reported aboard the ocean survey ship USC&GS Pioneer (OSS 31) to serve as her assistant operations officer and later her operations officer as she operated in the North Pacific Ocean, conducting surveys that kept her almost constantly underway between Hawaii and Alaska for 30-day stretches of time. Pioneer discovered a number of seamounts during Nygren's tour.

In January 1962, after his tour aboard Pioneer ended, Nygren was originally scheduled for a tour in Washington, D.C., but instead was transferred on short notice to duty with the United States Department of State, which was just starting to fulfill Antarctic Treaty requirements to send U.S. representatives with foreign expeditions to Antarctica. He boarded the Danish ship Kista Dan at Montevideo, Uruguay, for transportation to the Falkland Islands (also known as the Malvinas), where he transferred to the British research ship RRS Shackleton. He served aboard Shackleton and the British research ship RRS John Biscoe as U.S. representative to the British Antarctic Survey until May 1962, visiting all the bases along the coast of West Antarctica as well as the Argentine Islands, South Georgia Island, and the Falklands (or Malvinas).

Nygren then returned to the United States for duty as Assistant Chief of the Coast and Geodetic Survey's planning staff in 1962, and in 1964 he became the chief of the planning staff. During his time on the planning staff, he was involved in many of the negotiations that led to the creation of a new United States Government scientific organization, the Environmental Science Services Administration (ESSA).

=== ESSA Corps ===
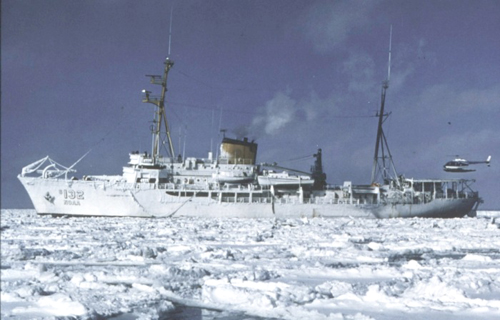
The ocean survey ship USC&GS Surveyor (OSS 32) conducting helicopter operations in the Bering Sea. Nygren was her commanding officer in 1968.

On 13 July 1965, ESSA was created. Under the reorganization that created ESSA, both the Coast and Geodetic Survey and the United States Weather Bureau, although retaining their independent identities, came under the control of ESSA, and the Coast and Geodetic Survey Corps was removed from the Coast and Geodetic Survey and subordinated directly to ESSA, becoming the Environmental Science Services Administration Corps (ESSA Corps). As of that date, Nygren became an officer of the new ESSA Corps. Under the reorganization, he also became Deputy Director and Chief Planning Analyst for Service Programs in the Office of Planning and Program Evaluation.

By August 1966, Nygren was a captain, but that month he voluntarily accepted a reduction in rank to commander so that he could go back to sea. That month, he reported aboard the ocean survey ship USC&GS Surveyor (OSS 32) as her executive officer. She operated in the North Pacific Ocean, conducted experiments in the Line Islands, carried out a project around islands off Mexico with Mexican scientists embarked, and worked in the Bering Sea, along the southeast coast of Alaska, and in the Aleutian Islands. In 1968, Nygren became the commanding officer of Surveyor while she was operating in Cook Inlet, and with him in command, she conducted pioneering geophysical surveys of gravity and magnetism – prototypes for future studies of the continental shelf – between Hawaii and the United States West Coast before returning to the Bering Sea, where she conducted operations as far north as Cape Prince of Wales. Promoted to the permanent rank of captain while in command of Surveyor, he turned over command of her to his successor in August 1968 in Nome, Alaska.

Promoted to rear admiral, Nygren became Associate Administrator of ESSA in October 1968. In his new position, he became involved in the organization of the new National Oceanic and Atmospheric Administration (NOAA).

=== Director, NOAA Corps ===
On 3 October 1970, ESSA was abolished and replaced by NOAA. Under the reorganization that accompanied the creation of NOAA, the Coast and Geodetic Survey was abolished and its functions were transferred to various parts of the new NOAA organization. The ESSA Corps became the new National Oceanic and Atmospheric Administration Commissioned Officer Corps (NOAA Corps), and Nygren became a NOAA Corps officer. On 27 October 1970, he became Acting Director of the NOAA Corps, and the United States Senate confirmed President Richard Nixon's appointment of him to this position on 19 February 1971, making him the first Director of the NOAA Corps.

As NOAA Corps director, Nygren represented NOAA on multidisciplinary projects, commissions, and task forces, usually involving maritime issues. He participated in a demonstration project testing methods for operating in ice to extend the navigation season on the Great Lakes, the committee on the delimitation of the coast line of the United States and issues related to U.S. control of the economic exploitation of the continental shelf, a task force on the United Nations Convention on the Law of the Sea, a task force on oil spills, an interagency committee on oceanography, the Interagency Arctic Research Committee, the Intergovernmental Oceanographic Commission, and an inspection team for U.S. bases in Antarctica. His duties took him on visits to Alaska, Antarctica, the International Hydrographic Bureau in Monaco, and the World Meteorological Organization in Geneva, Switzerland.

In 1972, under Nygren's direction, the NOAA Corps became the first of the then-seven uniformed services of the United States to recruit women on the same basis as men. He also directed the expansion of the NOAA Corps training program and arranged for it to be located at the United States Merchant Marine Academy in Kings Point, New York.

After over ten years as NOAA Corps director, Nygren retired on 1 January 1981.

== Professional life ==
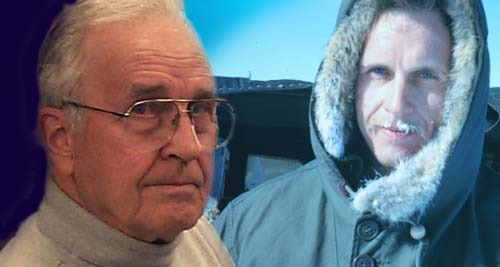
In retirement, Nygren poses before the photograph he took of himself while working with a Coast and Geodetic Survey field party on the Alaska North Slope in the winter of 1950.

Nygren was a prolific photographer during his Coast and Geodetic Survey Corps, ESSA Corps, and NOAA Corps career, and the NOAA Photo Library includes many photographs credited to him.

Nygren was a member of the Marine Technology Society.

== Awards ==
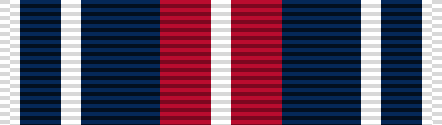
- Department of Commerce Gold Medal, 1975
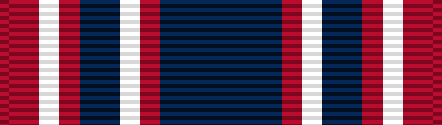
- Department of Commerce Bronze Medal
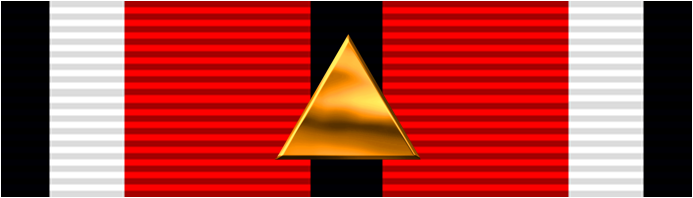
- Karo Award, 1961
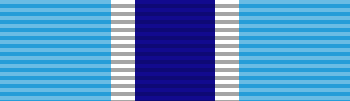
- NOAA Unit Citation Award

In a ceremony on 21 October 1975 in Washington, D.C., Nygren was awarded the Department of Commerce Gold Medal while serving as the Director of the NOAA Corps. The program for the award ceremony cited his achievements as follows:

Rear Admiral Nygren has provided distinguished direction to the NOAA Corps through outstanding professional competence and leadership. His highly effective guidance, insight, and management are directly responsible for the necessary expansion, development, and adaptation of the Corps to best serve the public interest and to support the diverse missions of the National Oceanic and Atmospheric Administration (NOAA) and the Department. His success in meeting the program needs of NOAA is evidenced by an ever-increasing demand for officer assignments by all of its major entities. He was mostly responsible for the expansion of the NOAA Corps training program and for its location at the United States Merchant Marine Academy, Kings Point, New York. Studies for personnel analysis and evaluation which he initiated resulted in increased strength and stability of the Corps. Rear Admiral Nygren has given special attention to the concerns of minority groups, including the commissioning of women into the Corps to serve in the field on an equal basis with men.

Nygren received the Society of American Military Engineers Karo Award in 1961. In addition, Nygren received the Department of Commerce Bronze Medal, a NOAA Unit Citation Award, and commendations from the United States Navy and the United States Air Force during his career.

== Death ==
Nygren died on 17 November 2019 at the age of 94. He was buried at Indiantown Gap National Cemetery in Annville, Pennsylvania.

== Commemoration ==
Mount Nygren on Kyiv Peninsula in western Graham Land on Antarctica at 65°9′S 63°48′W is named for Nygren.

Nygren Canyon, an underwater canyon in the Atlantic Ocean along the continental shelf of North America about 150 nautical miles (278 km; 173 mi) off Cape Cod, Massachusetts, at 40°39′N 66°30′W also is named for Nygren.

Military offices
Preceded by none	Director, National Oceanic and Atmospheric Administration; Commissioned Officer Corps; 1970–1981	Succeeded by Kelly E. Taggart
