= Atlantic War Zone Medal =

Atlantic War Zone Medal may refer to:

- Coast and Geodetic Survey Atlantic War Zone Medal, an award of the United States Coast and Geodetic Survey
- Merchant Marine Atlantic War Zone Medal, an award of the United States Merchant Marine
