= Kelly E. Taggart =

Former NOAA Corps Director

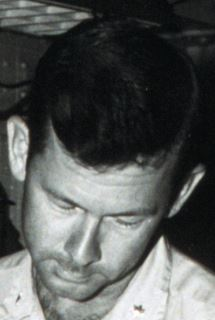
- Kelly E. Taggart as a lieutenant commander, serving as field operations officer aboard the medium survey ship USC&GS Hydrographer (MSS 19).
- Born: 17 December 1932; Cairo, Illinois
- Died: 7 May 2014 (aged 81); Centertown, Missouri
- Burial place: St. Paul's Evangelical Church; Jamestown, Missouri
- Military career
- Allegiance: United States of America
- Branch: United States Coast and Geodetic Survey Corps (1955–1965); Environmental Science Services Administration Corps (1965–1970); NOAA Commissioned Officer Corps (1970–1986)
- Rank: Rear Admiral
- Commands: NOAAS Oceanographer (R 101); NOAA Commissioned Officer Corps
- Conflicts: Cold War
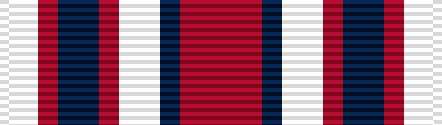
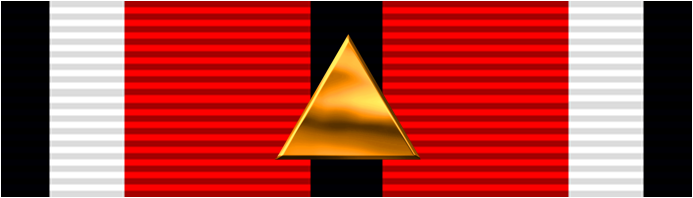
- Awards: Department of Commerce Silver Medal; Karo Award

Rear Admiral Kelly E. Taggart (17 December 1932 – 7 May 2014) was a career officer who served in the United States Coast and Geodetic Survey Corps, its successor, the Environmental Science Services Administration Corps (ESSA Corps), and the ESSA Corps's successor, the National Oceanic and Atmospheric Administration Commissioned Officer Corps (NOAA Corps). He served as the second Director of the NOAA Corps.

== Early life ==
Kelly Edward Taggart was born in Cairo, Illinois, on 17 December 1932, the son of Curtis A. Taggart (1908–1965) and the former Bernice K. Garnett (1910–2000). He attended Centertown High School in Centertown, Missouri, and graduated from Jefferson City High School in Jefferson City, Missouri. After high school, he attended Jefferson City Junior College in Jefferson City before transferring to the University of Missouri, from which he graduated with a Bachelor of Science degree in civil engineering in 1955. He later received a master's degree from the School of Public Affairs and Institute of Marine Affairs at the University of Washington.

== Career ==
In 1955, Taggart joined the United States Coast and Geodetic Survey, accepting a commission as an ensign in the United States Coast and Geodetic Survey Corps, beginning a career of surveying, charting, and geophysical research. He rose through the ranks of the Coast and Geodetic Survey Corps over the next ten years.

On 13 July 1965, a new United States Government scientific agency, the Environmental Science Services Administration (ESSA), was created. Under the reorganization that created ESSA, both the Coast and Geodetic Survey and the United States Weather Bureau, although retaining their independent identities, came under the control of ESSA, and the Coast and Geodetic Survey Corps was removed from the Coast and Geodetic Survey and subordinated directly to ESSA, becoming the Environmental Science Services Administration Corps (ESSA Corps). As of that date, Taggart became an officer of the new ESSA Corps. On 3 October 1970, ESSA was abolished and replaced by the National Oceanic and Atmospheric Administration (NOAA). Under the reorganization that accompanied the creation of NOAA, the Coast and Geodetic Survey was abolished and its functions were transferred to various parts of the new NOAA organization. The ESSA Corps became the new National Oceanic and Atmospheric Administration Commissioned Officer Corps (NOAA Corps), and Taggart became a NOAA Corps officer.

During his career, Taggart served for a combined seven years aboard five survey ships. At sea, he served as the co-director of geophysical studies of plate tectonics that determined how the crustal plates of North America, the Pacific Ocean, and Asia are connected. He also served in the Gulf of Mexico where he conducted geophysical surveys that identified underwater salt domes for the stocking of U.S. strategic oil reserves. He was the operations officer for the International Air-Sea Interaction Project in the tropical Atlantic Ocean, coordinating the activities of six research ships, 15 aircraft, and 20 university and government research agencies from three countries. While serving as commanding officer of the research ship NOAAS Oceanographer (R 101) during the 1970s, he oversaw research studies of the physical, biological, and benthic region in the tropical Pacific Ocean to determine its biological productivity and the potential damage to the area from deep-ocean mining of manganese nodules.

For nine years, Taggart served in a flight status, flying both helicopters and fixed-wing aircraft on mapping missions. He also served in Washington, D.C., in the Office of Congressional and Legislative Affairs on Capitol Hill and as director of the National Ocean Service. He was deputy associate director of NOAA's Office of Fleet Operations when, in 1980, he was appointed Director of the National Oceanic and Atmospheric Administration Commissioned Officer Corps. In 1986 he retired from that position with the rank of rear admiral.

== Personal and professional life ==
Taggart married the former Jenice Haldiman on 4 June 1960. He was a member of the University of Missouri's Academy of Distinguished Alumni.

== Awards ==
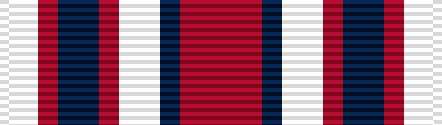
- Department of Commerce Silver Medal
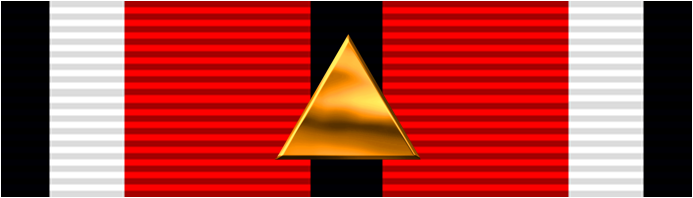
- Karo Award

Taggart received the Department of Commerce Silver Medal, the Society of American Military Engineers Karo Award, the Distinguished Engineer Award from the University of Missouri, and many other honors and awards.

Military offices
Preceded by Harley D. Nygren	Director, National Oceanic and Atmospheric Administration; Commissioned Officer Corps; 1981–1986	Succeeded by Francis D. "Bill" Moran
