= Meritorious Service Medal (United States) =

United States Armed Forces military award

- Type: Military medal
- Awarded for: Outstanding meritorious achievement or service to the United States
- Presented by: United States Department of the Army; United States Department of the Navy; United States Department of the Air Force; United States Department of Homeland Security
- Eligibility: Military Personnel Only
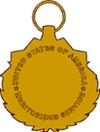
- Reverse
- Status: Currently Awarded
- Established: 1969; 57 years ago
- Meritorious Service ribbon

Precedence
- Next (higher): Defense Meritorious Service Medal
- Next (lower): Air Medal

The Meritorious Service Medal (MSM) is a military award presented to members of the United States Armed Forces who distinguish themselves with outstanding meritorious achievement or service to the United States.

Introduced in 1969, the MSM was long awarded as a decoration for peacetime achievement. Since 2004, it has also been bestowed in lieu of the Bronze Star Medal for meritorious achievement in a designated combat theater. Normally, the acts or services rendered must be comparable to that required for the Legion of Merit but in a duty of lesser, though considerable, responsibility.

A higher award and decoration, the Defense Meritorious Service Medal (DMSM), is intended for similar services performed under joint duty within the United States Department of Defense, including the Joint Staff, the Unified Combatant Commands, and joint task forces under their cognizance.

== Recipients ==
The Meritorious Service Medal is given to all ranks for meritorious service in the U.S. Army, U.S. Air Force, and U.S. Space Force. It may be awarded for meritorious performance while serving in a staff position as a field grade officer, senior chief warrant officer, or senior non-commissioned officer, or, in the case of field grade officers, for successful completion of a command tour at the battalion (Army) or squadron (Army, Air Force, or Space Force) level. It is rarely awarded to officers in pay grades O-1 through O-3 (second lieutenant, first lieutenant, captain), junior warrant officers and chief warrant officers in pay grades W-1 and W-2 (WO1 and CW2, Army only), and junior NCOs in pay grades E-6 and below.

Within the U.S. Army, according to AR 600-8-22, Paragraph 3-17, the MSM may not be upgraded to or downgraded from a recommended Bronze Star Medal. In the Army, an MSM recommendation that is downgraded will be approved as an Army Commendation Medal (ARCOM).

Awarding authority in the Army, Air Force, and Space Force is typically the first O-6 or above in the recipient's chain of command.

The U.S. Navy, U.S. Marine Corps, and U.S. Coast Guard subscribe to a slightly different philosophy from the Army, Air Force, and Space Force in awarding the MSM, typically reserving it for senior Navy and Coast Guard officers in pay grades O-5 to O-6 (commander and captain) and Marine Corps field grade officers in pay grades O-5 and O-6 (lieutenant colonel and colonel), with the first award of the MSM typically occurring after completion of a successful commanding officer assignment at the O-5 level. It is also typically given to those retiring after 20 years or more honorable service.

Award of the MSM to USN, USMC, and USCG officers in pay grade O-4 (USN & USCG lieutenant commander / USMC major) and below, including chief warrant officers and below (other than as an award at retirement) is typically by exception and normally limited to those who have held a commanding officer assignment such as one of the U.S. Navy's handful of O-4 level commanding officer assignments (e.g., Avenger-class mine countermeasures ship). Other instances may be those serving on a USN or USCG flag officer staff or USMC general officer staff.

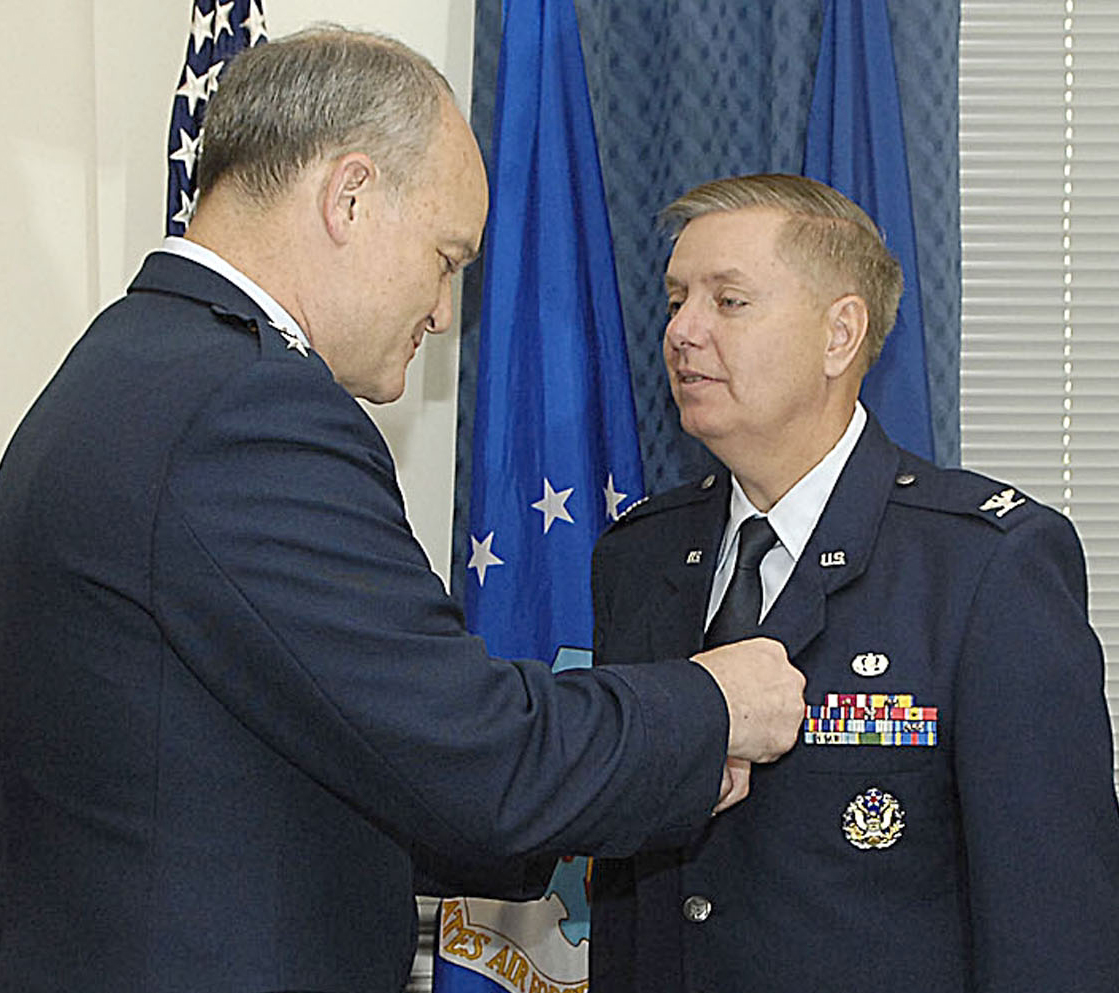
Lt. Gen. Jack L. Rives pins the Meritorious Service Medal on Colonel Lindsey Graham, April 2009

For enlisted ranks, the Navy, Marine Corps, and Coast Guard typically limit the award of the MSM to pay grades E-8 (e.g., USN/USCG senior chief petty officer and USMC master sergeant or first sergeant) and E-9 (e.g., USN/USCG master chief petty officer and USMC sergeant major or master gunnery sergeant). Awarding the MSM to pay grade E-7 (e.g., USN/USCG chief petty officer and USMC gunnery sergeant) and below is very rare and by exception.

In the Navy, Marine Corps, and Coast Guard, the awarding authority for the MSM must be either a flag officer or general officer holding the pay grade of O-7 or above. It is most common for Navy and Coast Guard master chief petty officers (typically command master chief petty officers) and Marine Corps master gunnery sergeants and sergeants major to receive the MSM as an end-of-tour award and/or upon retirement.

Foreign military personnel in the ranks of NATO OF-5 (US O-6 equivalent) and below and people who have displayed a level of service that warrants an award of such magnitude may also be eligible to be awarded the MSM, if approved by a U.S. flag officer or general officer. To receive this medal, the individual must exhibit exceptionally meritorious service at that level of responsibility.

== Design and devices ==
The Meritorious Service Medal is a bronze medal, 1.5 inches in diameter overall, consisting of six rays issuant from the upper three points of a five-pointed star with beveled edges and containing two smaller stars defined by incised outlines; in front of the lower part of the star an eagle with wings upraised standing upon two upward curving branches of laurel tied with a ribbon between the feet of the eagle. The reverse has the encircled inscriptions "UNITED STATES OF AMERICA" and "MERITORIOUS SERVICE". The suspension ribbon is 1 3/8 inches wide and consists of the following stripes: 1/8 inch Crimson 67112; 1/4 inch White 67101; center 5/8 inch Crimson; 1/4 inch White; and 1/8 inch Crimson.

The medal was designed by Jay Morris of the Institute of Heraldry, and the design was approved on March 20, 1969, by the medal committee appointed by the defense secretary. The ribbon design follows the colors used for the Legion of Merit to reflect the parallel between the two medals. The eagle, symbol of the United States, stands on laurel branches denoting achievement. The star is used to represent the military service and the rays emanating therefrom denote the constant efforts of individuals to achieve through excellent and meritorious service.

Additional awards of the Meritorious Service Medal are denoted by bronze oak leaf clusters in the Army, Air Force, and Space Force, with one silver oak leaf cluster denoting five additional awards. (1 silver OLC plus the medal itself represents six) and gold 5/16 inch stars in the U.S. Navy, U.S. Marine Corps and U.S. Coast Guard (with a 5/16 inch silver star denoting five additional awards). These devices are also authorized for wear on the suspension and service ribbon of the medal. In certain instances, the U.S. Coast Guard also authorizes an Operational Distinguishing Device for the medal.

== History ==
At the Tri-Department Awards Conference (February 5, 1968), there was a discussion about the need for a third meritorious award to provide appropriate recognition for non-combat achievement or service comparable to that of the Bronze Star Medal for combat achievement or service. It was felt that the Legion of Merit's prestige was slipping because it was being used with increasing frequency to reward service below the Legion of Merit's intended standard, but higher than that required for the Commendation Medals of the various military services.

An ad hoc committee was formed by the Secretary of Defense (M&RA) to select a name. On November 8, 1968, the committee unanimously approved the name "Meritorious Service Medal". President Lyndon B. Johnson established the MSM in Executive Order 11448, dated January 16, 1969. The Executive Order was amended by President Ronald Reagan per Executive Order 12312, dated July 2, 1981, to authorize the award for members of the armed forces of friendly foreign nations.

Until 2003, the MSM could only be awarded for peacetime service and could not be awarded in a combat zone; the MSM equivalent for those zones was the Bronze Star Medal (BSM). As in 1968 when the MSM was created, there were concerns that the prestige of the BSM was also slipping during combat operations in Southwest Asia that had essentially been continuous since 1990. In 2003, authority to award the MSM for combat zone service was authorized, retroactive to September 11, 2001.

== See also ==
- Coast and Geodetic Survey Meritorious Service Medal, an award of the United States Coast and Geodetic Survey
- Merchant Marine Meritorious Service Medal, an award of the United States Merchant Marine
- Meritorious Civilian Service Award – a comparable award given to civilian employees of the United States Departments of Defense and its agencies.
