= Defense Service Medal =

Defense Service Medal may refer to:

- American Defense Service Medal, a U.S. military award
- Coast and Geodetic Survey Defense Service Medal, an award of the United States Coast and Geodetic Survey
- Korea Defense Service Medal, a U.S. military award
- National Defense Service Medal, a U.S. military award

== See also ==
- Defense Distinguished Service Medal
- Defense Meritorious Service Medal
- Defense Superior Service Medal
