= Negreni =

Negreni may refer to several places in Romania:

- Negreni, a commune in Cluj County
- Negreni, a village in Dârmănești Commune, Argeș County
- Negreni, a village in Poduri Commune, Bacău County
- Negreni, a village in Știubieni Commune, Botoșani County
- Negreni, a village in Licurici Commune, Gorj County
- Negreni, a village in Scornicești town, Olt County
- Negreni, a village in Ileanda Commune, Sălaj County
- Negreni, a village in Tătărăștii de Jos Commune, Teleorman County
- Negreni, a village in Mihăești Commune, Vâlcea County
- Negreni (river), a tributary of the Amaradia in Gorj County

and to:

- Negrenii-Osebiți, a village in Tătărăștii de Jos Commune, Teleorman County
- Negrenii de Câmpie, a village in Band Commune, Mureș County
- Negrenii de Sus, a village in Tătărăștii de Jos Commune, Teleorman County

and to:

- Negreni, the Romanian name for Negrintsi village, Dranytsia Commune, Novoselytsia Raion, Ukraine
