= Asiatic–Pacific Campaign Medal =

American campaign medal

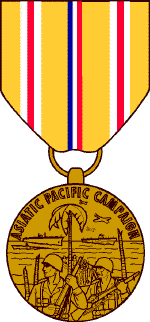
- Obverse
- Type: Military medal Campaign medal
- Presented by: Department of War and Department of the Navy
- Eligibility: Served in the U.S. armed forces for at least 30 days in the Asiatic-Pacific Theater between December 7, 1941, and March 2, 1946
- Status: Inactive
- First award: December 7, 1941
- Final award: March 2, 1946
- Service ribbon and campaign streamer.

Precedence
- Next (higher): American Defense Service Medal
- Equivalent: American Campaign Medal; European-African-Middle Eastern Campaign Medal
- Next (lower): World War II Victory Medal

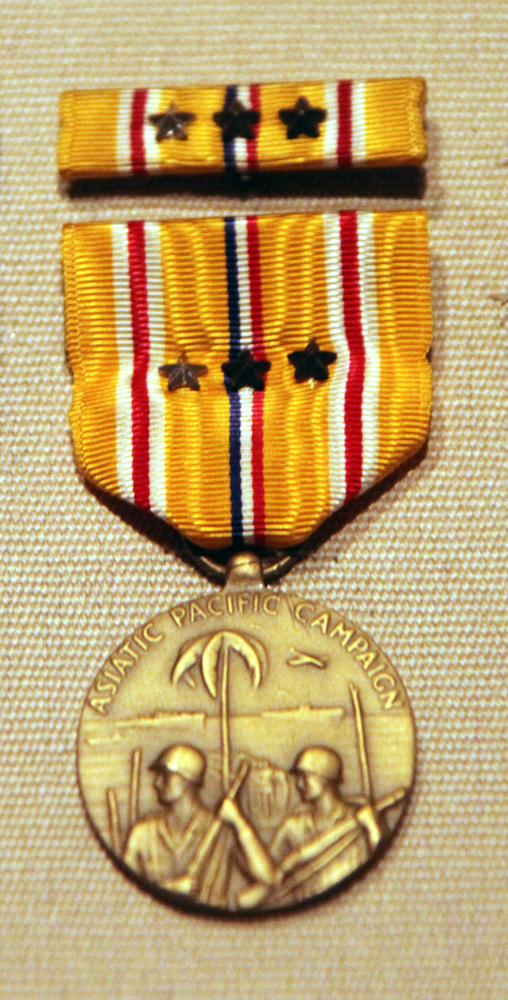
Photograph of an Asiatic–Pacific Campaign Medal with one silver campaign star and two bronze campaign stars, representing seven campaigns.

The Asiatic–Pacific Campaign Medal was a United States military award of the Second World War, which was awarded to any member of the United States Armed Forces who served in the Asiatic-Pacific Theater from 1941 to 1945. The medal was created on November 6, 1942, by Executive Order 9265 issued by President Franklin D. Roosevelt. The medal was designed by Thomas Hudson Jones; the reverse side was designed by Adolph Alexander Weinman which is the same design as used on the reverse of the American Campaign Medal and European-African-Middle Eastern Campaign Medal.

There were 21 Army and 48 Navy-Marine Corps official campaigns of the Pacific Theater, denoted on the suspension and service ribbon of the medal by service stars which also were called "battle stars"; some Navy construction battalion units issued the medal with Arabic numerals. The Arrowhead device is authorized for those campaigns which involved participation in amphibious assault landings. The Fleet Marine Force Combat Operation Insignia is also authorized for wear on the medal for Navy service members who participated in combat while assigned to a Marine Corps unit. The flag colors of the United States and Japan are visible in the ribbon.

The Asiatic–Pacific Campaign Medal was first issued as a service ribbon in 1942. A full medal was authorized in 1947, the first of which was presented to General of the Army Douglas MacArthur. The European Theater equivalent of the medal was known as the European-African-Middle Eastern Campaign Medal.

Boundaries of Asiatic-Pacific Theater. (1) The eastern boundary is coincident with the western boundary of the American Theater. (2) The western boundary is from the North Pole south along the 60th meridian east longitude to its intersection with the east boundary of Iran, then south along the Iran boundary to the Gulf of Oman and the intersection of the 60th meridian east longitude, then south along the 60th meridian east longitude to the South Pole.

== US Army campaigns ==
The 16 officially recognized US Army campaigns in the Asiatic-Pacific Theater of Operations are:

- Pacific Ocean Areas Command:
  - Central Pacific: 7 December 1941 – 6 December 1943, allied landings on Tarawa and Makin during the Gilbert and Marshall Islands campaign
  - Air Offensive Japan: 17 April 1942 – 2 September 1945
  - Aleutian Islands: 3 June 1942 – 24 August 1943, the Aleutian Islands campaign
  - Northern Solomons: 22 February 1943 – 21 November 1944, part of the Solomon Islands campaign
  - Eastern Mandates: 31 January - 14 June 1944, allied landings on Kwajalein and Eniwetok during the Gilbert and Marshall Islands campaign
  - Western Pacific: 15 June 1944 – 2 September 1945, the Mariana and Palau Islands campaign
  - Ryukyus: 26 March - 2 July 1945, the allied landings on Okinawa
- South West Pacific Areas Command:
  - Philippine Islands: 7 December 1941 – 10 May 1942, the Japanese conquest Philippines
  - East Indies: 1 January - 22 July 1942, Japanese conquest of the Dutch East Indies
  - Papua: 23 July 1942 – 23 January 1943, part of the New Guinea campaign
  - Guadalcanal: 7 August 1942 – 21 February 1943, the Guadalcanal campaign
  - New Guinea: 24 January 1943 – 31 December 1944, the New Guinea campaign
  - Bismarck Archipelago: 15 December 1943 – 27 November 1944
  - Leyte: 17 October 1944 – 1 July 1945, allied landings and liberation of Leyte
  - Luzon: 15 December 1944 – 4 July 1945, allied landings and liberation of Luzon
  - Southern Philippines: 27 February - 4 July 1945, allied liberation of the Southern Philippines during the Philippines campaign

== US Navy - Marine Corps campaigns ==
The 43 officially recognized US Navy campaigns in the Pacific Theater of Operations are:

- Pearl Harbor: Pearl Harbor-Midway: 7 December 1941
- Wake Island: 8–23 December 1941
- Philippine Islands operation: 8 December 1941 – 6 May 1942
- Netherlands East Indies engagements: 23 January – 27 February 1942
- Pacific raids (1942): 1 February – 10 March 1942
- Coral Sea: 4–8 May 1942
- Midway: 3–6 June 1942
- Guadalcanal-Tulagi landings: 7–9 August 1942 (First Savo)
- Capture and defense of Guadalcanal: 10 August 1942 – 8 February 1943
- Makin Raid: 17–18 August 1942
- Eastern Solomons: 23–25 August 1942
- Buin-Faisi-Tonolai raid: 5 October 1942
- Cape Esperance: 11–12 October 1942 (Second Savo)
- Santa Cruz Islands: 26 October 1942
- Guadalcanal: 12–15 November 1942 (Third Savo)
- Tassafaronga: 30 November – 1 December 1942 (Fourth Savo)
- Eastern New Guinea operation: 17 December 1942 – 24 July 1944
- Rennel Island: 29–30 January 1943
- Consolidation of Solomon Islands: 8 February 1943 – 15 March 1945
- Aleutians operation: 26 March – 2 June 1943
- New Georgia Group operation: 20 June – 16 October 1943
- Bismarck Archipelago operation: 25 June 1943 – 1 May 1944
- Pacific raids (1943): 31 August – 6 October 1943
- Treasury-Bougainville operation: 27 October – 15 December 1943
- Gilbert Islands operation: 13 November – 8 December 1943
- Marshall Islands operation: 26 November 1943 – 2 March 1944
- Asiatic-Pacific raids (1944): 16 February – 9 October 1944
- Western New Guinea operations: 21 April 1944 – 9 January 1945
- Marianas operation: 10 June – 27 August 1944
- Western Caroline Islands operation: 31 August – 14 October 1944
- Leyte operation: 10 October – 29 November 1944
- Luzon operation: 12 December 1944 – 1 April 1945
- Iwo Jima operation 15 February – 16 March 1945
- Okinawa Gunto operation: 17 March – 30 June 1945
- Third Fleet operations against Japan: 10 July – 15 August 1945
- Kurile Islands operation: 1 February 1944 – 11 August 1945
- Borneo operations: 27 April – 20 July 1945
- Tinian capture and occupation: 24 July – 1 August 1944
- Consolidation of the Southern Philippines: 28 February – 20 July 1945
- Hollandia operation: 21 April – 1 June 1944
- Manila Bay-Bicol operations: 29 January – 16 April 1945
- Escort, antisubmarine, armed guard and special operations: 7 December 1941 – 2 September 1945
- Submarine War Patrols (Pacific): 7 December 1941 – 2 September 1945

== Other campaigns ==
For members of the U.S. military who did not receive campaign credit, but still served on active duty in the Pacific Theater, the following “blanket” campaigns are authorized for which the Asiatic–Pacific Campaign Medal is awarded without service stars.

- Antisubmarine December 7, 1941 – September 2, 1945
- Ground Combat: December 7, 1941 – September 2, 1945
- Air Combat: December 7, 1941 – September 2, 1945

== Notable recipients ==
- Lieutenant Gerald Ford, USNR: US President
- Lieutenant John F. Kennedy, USNR: US President
- Lieutenant (junior grade) George H.W. Bush, USNR: US President
- General of the Army Douglas MacArthur
- Fleet Admiral Chester W. Nimitz, USN: Commander of United States Pacific Fleet
- Fleet Admiral William F. Halsey, USN: Commander of United States Third Fleet
- Admiral Raymond Spruance, USN: Commander of United States Fifth Fleet
- Admiral Hyman Rickover, USN: Father of the Nuclear Navy
- General Jonathan Wainwright, USA: Medal of Honor recipient
- General Jimmy Doolittle: Medal of Honor recipient
- General Alexander Vandergrift, USMC: Medal of Honor recipient and Commandant of the United States Marine Corps
- General David Shoup, USMC: Medal of Honor recipient and Commandant of the United States Marine Corps
- General Louis H. Wilson, Jr., USMC: Medal of Honor recipient and Commandant of the United States Marine Corps
- Lieutenant General Lewis "Chesty" Puller, USMC: Legendary Marine
- Rear Admiral Richard O'Kane, USN: Medal of Honor recipient
- Brigadier General Joseph Foss, ANG: Medal of Honor recipient and Governor of South Dakota
- Captain Harold Stassen, USNR: Governor of Minnesota
- Lieutenant Colonel Pappy Boyington, USMC: Medal of Honor recipient
- Major Richard Bong, USAAF: Medal of Honor recipient
- Captain John H. Chafee, USMC: US Senator, Governor of Rhode Island and Secretary of the Navy
- Lieutenant L. Ron Hubbard, USNR: Founder of Scientology
- Petty Officer Third Class Doris Miller, USN: Navy Cross recipient

== See also ==
- Service Star
- Arrowhead device
- Awards and decorations of the United States military
- Coast and Geodetic Survey Pacific War Zone Medal
- Merchant Marine Pacific War Zone Medal
