= Sigmund R. Petersen =

Former NOAA Corps Director

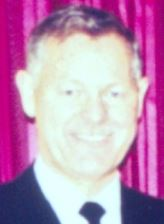
- Born: 22 November 1936; Haugesund, Norway
- Died: 24 January 2024 (aged 87); Everett, Washington, United States
- Military career
- Allegiance: United States of America
- Branch: United States Coast and Geodetic Survey Corps (1961–1965); Environmental Science Services Administration Corps (1965–1970); NOAA Commissioned Officer Corps (1970–1995)
- Service years: 1961–1995
- Rank: Rear Admiral
- Commands: NOAAS Miller Freeman (R 223); NOAAS Discoverer (R 102); NOAA Commissioned Officer Corps
- Conflicts: Cold War
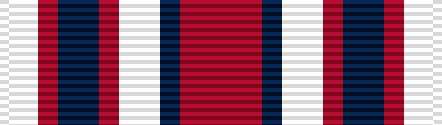
- Awards: Department of Commerce Silver Medal

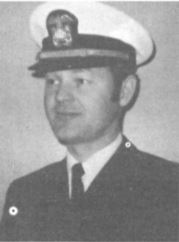
Petersen as a lieutenant commander.

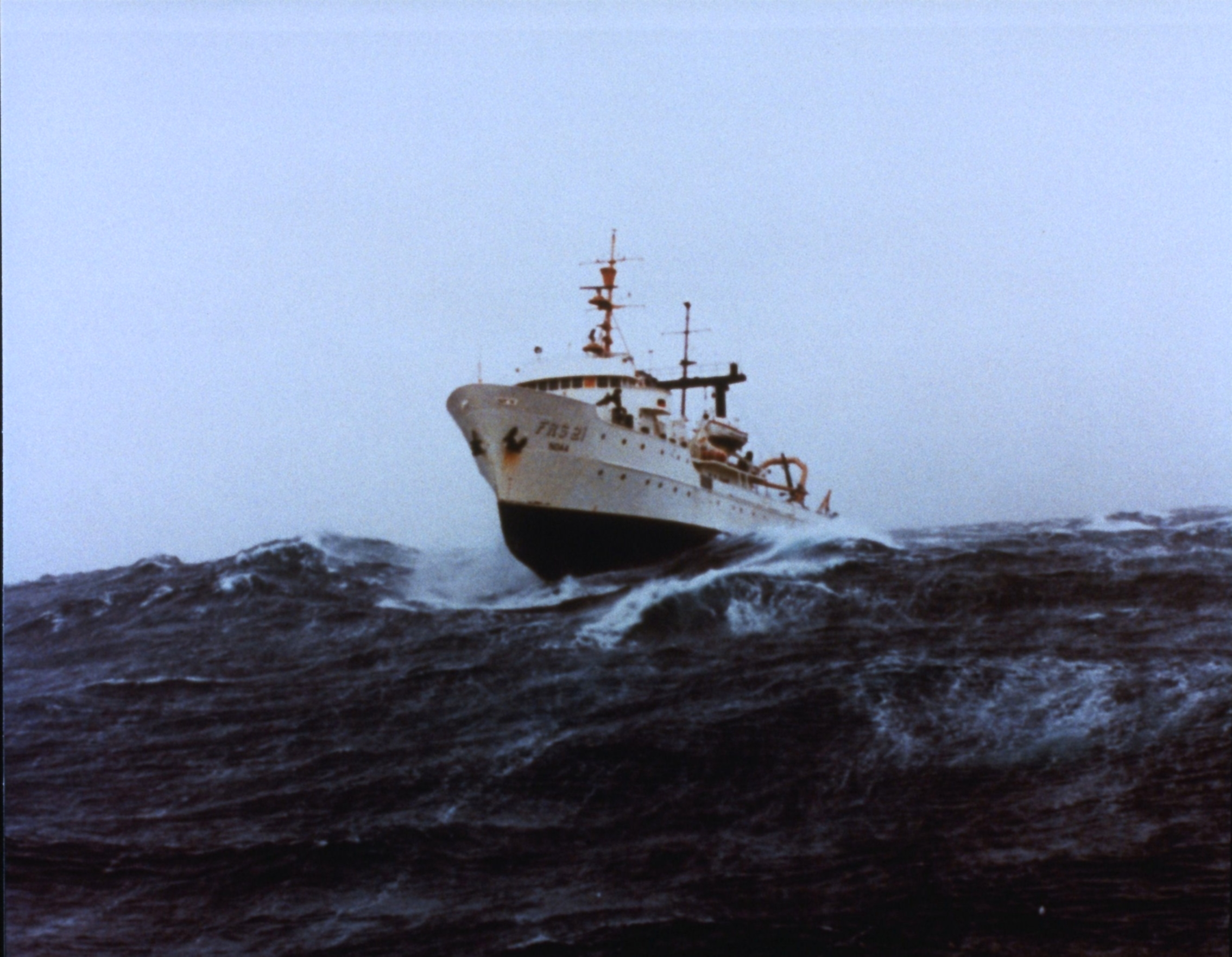
Under Petersen's command, NOAAS Miller Freeman (R 223) approaches a disabled vessel in heavy seas in the Bering Sea.

Rear Admiral Sigmund Rorgard Petersen (22 November 1936 – 24 January 2024) was a career officer who served in the United States Coast and Geodetic Survey Corps, its successor, the Environmental Science Services Administration Corps (ESSA Corps), and the ESSA Corps's successor, the National Oceanic and Atmospheric Administration Commissioned Officer Corps (NOAA Corps). He served as the fourth Director of the NOAA Corps.

== Early life ==
Petersen was born in Haugesund, Norway, on 22 November 1936. He and his family lived under the German occupation of Norway during World War II from 1940 to 1945. In 1948 he emigrated at the age of 11 with his parents to the United States, where his family settled in Everett, Washington. He worked as a paperboy for the Everett newspaper, The Daily Herald, and took pride in becoming the first member of his family to return to Norway to visit relatives there, using the money he saved from his newspaper delivery job.

Petersen graduated from Everett High School in 1956, and from Everett Community College in 1958. He then attended Washington State University, from which he graduated in 1961 with a Bachelor of Science degree in civil engineering.

== Career ==
In 1961, Petersen joined the United States Coast and Geodetic Survey, accepting a commission as an ensign in the United States Coast and Geodetic Survey Corps. On 13 July 1965, a new United States Government scientific agency, the Environmental Science Services Administration (ESSA), was created. Under the reorganization that created ESSA, both the Coast and Geodetic Survey and the United States Weather Bureau, although retaining their independent identities, came under the control of ESSA, and the Coast and Geodetic Survey Corps was removed from the Coast and Geodetic Survey and subordinated directly to ESSA, becoming the Environmental Science Services Administration Corps (ESSA Corps). As of that date, Petersen became an officer of the new ESSA Corps. On 3 October 1970, ESSA was abolished and replaced by the National Oceanic and Atmospheric Administration (NOAA). Under the reorganization that accompanied the creation of NOAA, the Coast and Geodetic Survey was abolished and its functions were transferred to various parts of the new NOAA organization. The ESSA Corps became the new National Oceanic and Atmospheric Administration Commissioned Officer Corps (NOAA Corps), and Petersen became a NOAA Corps officer.

Early in his career, Petersen was a junior officer aboard the Coast and Geodetic Survey ocean survey ship USC&GS Pathfinder (OSS 30) and with hydrographic survey field parties. He served a tour as a recruiting officer in Kansas City, Missouri, and as executive officer of the survey ship NOAAS McArthur (S 330), as acting chief of a special projects group in hydrography and oceanography, and as a liaison officer and operations control center leader for the 1969 interagency Barbados Oceanographic and Meteorological Experiment (BOMEX). In 1971, he received a master's degree in marine affairs from the University of Rhode Island. In July 1971, as a commander, he became the deputy director of the Lake Survey Center in Detroit, Michigan, serving there until March 1973. In 1974, he was operations officer of the Global Atmospheric Research Project's Atlantic Tropical Experiment in Senegal, which deployed an international force of 40 ships across the Atlantic Ocean. In a ceremony on 21 October 1975 in Washington, D.C., he was among a group of four NOAA personnel who received the Department of Commerce Silver Medal for their work in planning and implementing the Tropical Atlantic Experiment.

During his career, Petersen served aboard five different ships of the Coast and Geodetic Survey fleet and later the NOAA fleet, and during the 1970s and 1980s he served tours as commanding officer of the research ships NOAAS Miller Freeman (R 223) — the first NOAA Corps officer to command her — and NOAAS Discoverer (R 102). While he was in command of Miller Freeman, he and his ship came to the assistance of disabled fishing vessel in the Bering Sea during a storm, and a crew member took a dramatic photograph of Miller Freeman cresting a large wave as she approached the fishing vessel.

Petersen was Director of the NOAA Office of Marine Operations from January to September 1988. He then became Director of NOAA's Pacific Marine Center, in charge of NOAA's fleet of survey and research ships in the Pacific Ocean, remaining in the position until 1990. Early in his tour at the Pacific Marine Center, he was the operational coordinator of the United States Government's participation in Operation Breakthrough, an international effort in October 1988 to free three gray whales from pack ice in the Beaufort Sea near Point Barrow, Alaska. In 1989, he received the NOAA Administrator's Award for his achievements in Operation Breakthrough.

On 26 July 1990, President George H. W. Bush nominated Petersen to succeed Rear Admiral Francis D. "Bill" Moran as Director of the NOAA Corps. The United States Senate confirmed Petersen's appointment on 4 October 1990. Petersen was himself promoted to rear admiral and was sworn in as NOAA Corps Director on 23 October 1990. He served as director until 22 May 1995, when he was succeeded by Rear Admiral William L. Stubblefield and retired from NOAA.

Petersen's career had included stints in the pre-NOAA Coast and Geodetic Survey and in NOAA's National Ocean Service, Office of Oceanic and Atmospheric Research, National Marine Fisheries Service, and Office of Marine and Aviation Operations, with assignments in many locations in the continental United States, Hawaii, and England and a wide variety of duties that at various times included cartographic, geodetic, hydrographic, meteorological, oceanographic, and operational positions. During his career, he established a reputation as a self-effacing leader who was quick to defer credit for success to his subordinates. He was known for his passion for and vocal advocacy of NOAA science.

== Personal life ==
Petersen married Rebecca Ann Albritton in 1963. They had three daughters and a son.

== Later life ==
Throughout his retirement, Petersen maintained contact with his former colleagues at NOAA and accepted occasional brief recalls to active duty in the NOAA Corps to handle various administrative functions. His wife Rebecca died on 5 September 2023 after a 60-year marriage. He was residing with his daughters in Kent, Washington, when he died in Everett on 24 January 2024 after a brief stay in hospice care.

== Awards ==
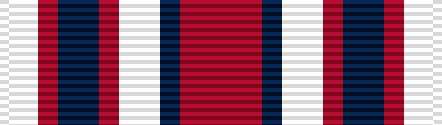
- Department of Commerce Silver Medal
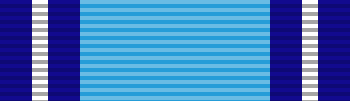
- NOAA Administrator's Award (1989)
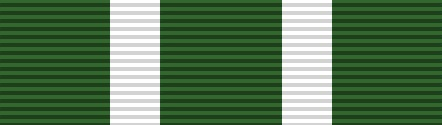
- NOAA Corps Commendation Medal (two awards)

Military offices
| Preceded by Francis D. "Bill" Moran | Director, National Oceanic and Atmospheric Administration; Commissioned Officer Corps; 1990–1995 | Succeeded by William L. Stubblefield |
