= Francis D. Moran =

Former NOAA Corps Director

Francis D. "Bill" Moran
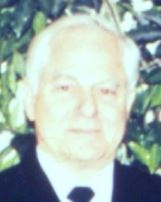
- Born: 8 May 1935 (age 91); Biloxi, Mississippi
- Military career
- Allegiance: United States of America
- Branch: United States Coast and Geodetic Survey Corps (1961–1965); Environmental Science Services Administration Corps (1965–1970); NOAA Commissioned Officer Corps (1970–1990)
- Rank: Rear Admiral
- Commands: NOAA Commissioned Officer Corps
- Conflicts: Cold War
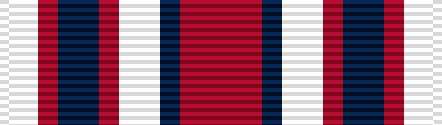
- Awards: Department of Commerce Silver Medal

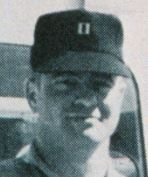
Moran as a lieutenant in the ESSA Corps.

Rear Admiral Francis D. "Bill" Moran (born 8 April 1935) is a retired career officer who served in the United States Coast and Geodetic Survey Corps, its successor, the Environmental Science Services Administration Corps (ESSA Corps), and the ESSA Corps's successor, the National Oceanic and Atmospheric Administration Commissioned Officer Corps (NOAA Corps). He served as the third Director of the NOAA Corps.

During his career, Moran created and led two new National Oceanic and Atmospheric Administration (NOAA) aviation units, and also established the first fisheries program for NOAA personnel.

== Early life ==
Moran was born in Biloxi, Mississippi, on 8 April 1935. He graduated from the University of Southern Mississippi in 1960 with a Bachelor of Science degree in mathematics and geology. After graduating, he was awarded an assistantship at the University of Tennessee.

== Career ==
In 1961, Moran joined the United States Coast and Geodetic Survey, accepting a commission as an ensign in the United States Coast and Geodetic Survey Corps. In the following years, he served on five survey ships of the Coast and Geodetic Survey fleet.

On 13 July 1965, a new United States Government scientific agency, the Environmental Science Services Administration (ESSA), was created. Under the reorganization that created ESSA, both the Coast and Geodetic Survey and the United States Weather Bureau, although retaining their independent identities, came under the control of ESSA, and the Coast and Geodetic Survey Corps was removed from the Coast and Geodetic Survey and subordinated directly to ESSA, becoming the Environmental Science Services Administration Corps (ESSA Corps). As of that date, Moran became an officer of the new ESSA Corps. On 3 October 1970, ESSA was abolished and replaced by the National Oceanic and Atmospheric Administration (NOAA). Under the reorganization that accompanied the creation of NOAA, the Coast and Geodetic Survey was abolished and its functions were transferred to various parts of the new NOAA organization. The ESSA Corps became the new National Oceanic and Atmospheric Administration Commissioned Officer Corps (NOAA Corps), and Moran became a NOAA Corps officer.

Moran served as chief of NOAA's Pacific Tides Party and as NOAA liaison to the United States Navy from 1970 to 1973. In 1974, he attended the University of Rhode Island full-time, graduating that year with a master's degree in marine affairs; during his time at the university, he established and attended the first fisheries program for NOAA personnel. From 1975 to 1981, he was assigned to the NOAA Research Facilities Center, where he established and served as chief of the Helicopter Operations Group, which supported the Outer Continental Shelf Energy Assessment Program. From 1982 to 1983, Moran was the executive assistant in the Office of the Deputy Administrator of NOAA. From 1983 to 1986, he was the first director of NOAA's new Office of Aircraft Operations, bringing together five semi-autonomous NOAA aviation units to create the new office, and by the end of that tour was a rear admiral who had amassed over 6,000 hours in flight time and was the only NOAA Corps officer qualified in every type of helicopter and fixed-wing aircraft in the NOAA inventory.

On 17 June 1986, President Ronald Reagan nominated Moran to succeed Rear Admiral Kelly E. Taggart as Director of the NOAA Corps. Confirmed by the United States Senate that year, he served as director until his retirement in 1990.

== Personal life ==
Moran and his wife have two children.

== Awards ==
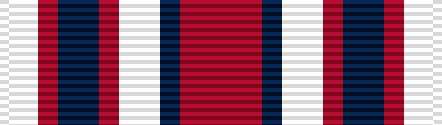
Department of Commerce Silver Medal

In a ceremony on 20 November 1986 in Washington, D.C., Moran received the Department of Commerce Silver Medal for his work during his 1983–1986 tour as director of the new Office of Aviation Operations.

Military offices
Preceded by Kelly E. Taggart	Director, National Oceanic and Atmospheric Administration; Commissioned Officer Corps; 1986–1990	Succeeded by Sigmund R. Petersen
