= Mount Nygren =

Mountain in Graham Land, Antarctica

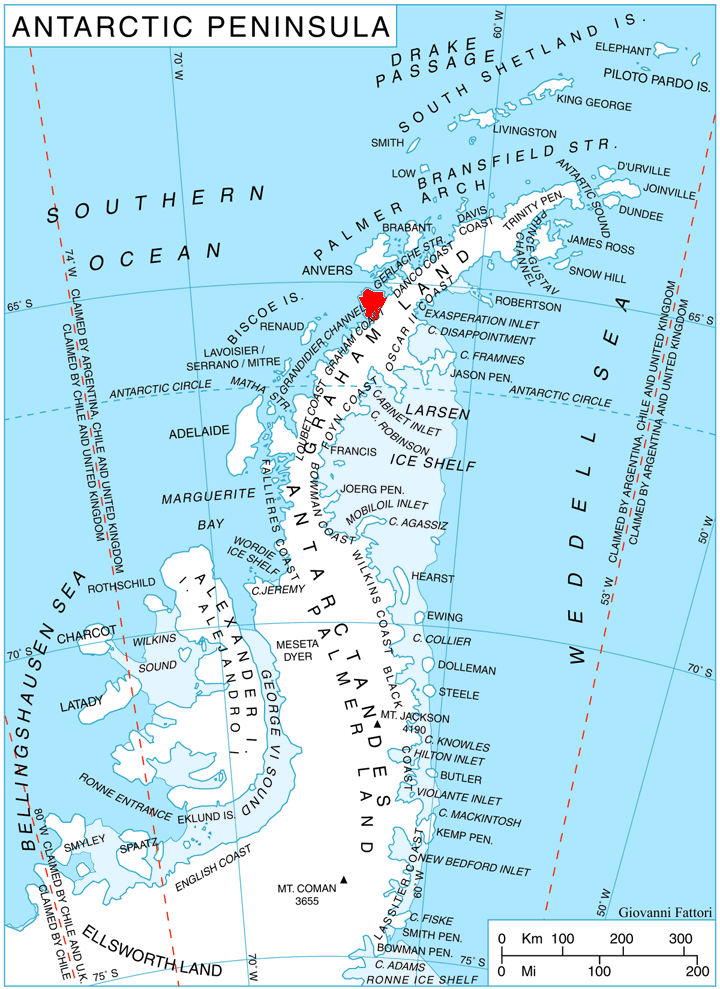
Location of Kyiv Peninsula in Graham Land, Antarctic Peninsula.

Mount Nygren (65°9′S 63°48′W) is an outstanding pointed mountain, bearing the aspect of a stark rock nunatak of pyramidal shape, which rises sharply above the middle of Hotine Glacier on Kyiv Peninsula in western Graham Land, Antarctica.

== History ==
Aircraft crews of the United States Navy's Antarctic Development Squadron Six (VXE-6) photographed the mountain in 1969.

The Advisory Committee on Antarctic Names (US-ACAN) named the mountain for Rear Admiral Harley D. Nygren, who was the Director of the National Oceanic and Atmospheric Administration Commissioned Officer Corps from 1970 to 1980. He previously had served as U.S. observer with the British Antarctic Survey in 1962, when as an officer of the NOAA Corps' predecessor, the United States Coast and Geodetic Survey Corps, he conducted oceanographic research aboard the British research ships RRS Shackleton and RRS John Biscoe.
