= USS PCS-1450 =

Minesweeper of the United States Navy

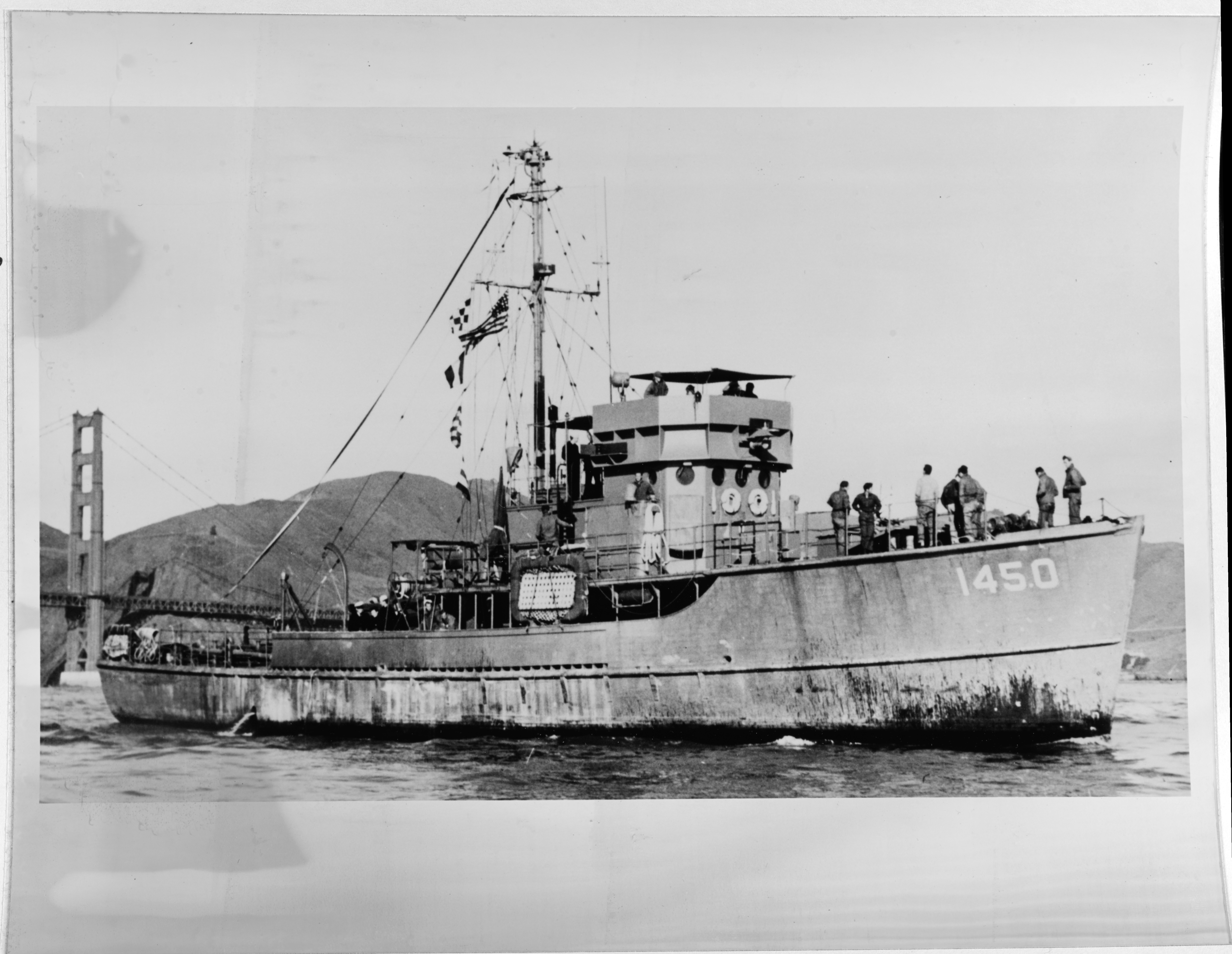
- USS PCS-1450 in San Francisco Bay, California, c. 1945-46

History

United States Navy
- Name: USS PC-1450
- Builder: Burger Boat Company, Manitowoc, Wisconsin
- Laid down: 16 February 1943
- Renamed: USS PCS-1450, April 1943
- Reclassified: Patrol craft sweeper (PCS), April 1943
- Launched: 14 August 1943
- Acquired: January 1944 (delivered)
- Commissioned: 3 February 1944
- Decommissioned: August 1946
- Stricken: February 1947
- Fate: Transferred to U.S. Coast and Geodetic Survey August 1946

History

U.S. Coast and Geodetic Survey
- Name: USC&GS Hodgson (CSS 26)
- Namesake: Commander Carey V. Hodgson (1880–1929), U.S. Coast and Geodetic Survey Corps officer
- Acquired: August 1946
- Fate: Sold 1967

General characteristics
- Class & type: PCS-1376-class minesweeper
- Displacement: 320 t.
- Length: 136 ft (41 m)
- Beam: 24 ft 6 in (7.47 m)
- Draft: 8 ft 7 in (2.62 m)
- Propulsion: 2 × 880 bhp General Motors 8-268A diesel engines, Knobstedt single reduction gear; 2 shafts
- Speed: 14.1 knots (26.1 km/h)
- Complement: 57
- Armament: 1 × 3"/50 caliber gun mount; 1 × 20 mm gun mount; 4 × depth charge projectors; 4 × Hedgehog; 2 × depth charge tracks

USS PCS-1450, ex-PC-1450, was a United States Navy minesweeper in commission from 1944 to 1946. She saw service in the latter stages of World War II.

After her Navy service, PCS-1450 was transferred to the United States Coast and Geodetic Survey, where she saw service as the coastal survey ship USC&GS Hodgson (CSS 26) from 1946 to 1967.

== Construction and commissioning ==
The ship was laid down as PC-1450 on 16 February 1943 by the Burger Boat Company in Manitowoc, Wisconsin. Reclassified as a "patrol craft sweeper" (PCS) in April 1943 and redesignated PCS-1450, she was launched on 14 August 1943 and commissioned as USS PCS-1450 on 3 February 1944.

== United States Navy service ==
PCS-1450 made a shakedown cruise in the Caribbean Sea, then operated between Key West, Florida, and Guantanamo Bay, Cuba, as a patrol and escort ship until June 1945. She then was transferred to the Hawaiian Islands, where she served from late July 1945 until February 1946 before returning to the United States.

After undergoing conversion into a survey ship, PCS-1450 was decommissioned in August 1946 and transferred to the United States Coast and Geodetic Survey the same month. She was stricken from the Naval Vessel Register in February 1947.

== United States Coast and Geodetic Survey service ==
The U.S. Coast and Geodetic Survey commissioned the vessel in August 1946 as the coastal survey ship USC&GS Hodgson (CSS 26). Hodgson served on hydrographic survey duties along the United States West Coast and in Alaska until 1967, when she was decommissioned and sold.

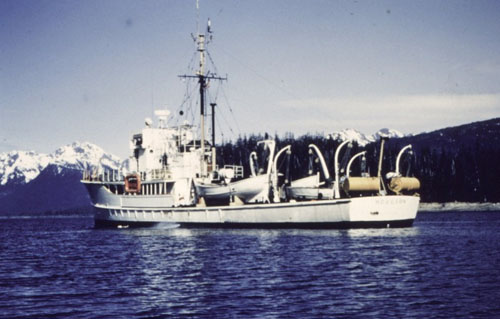
USC&GS Hodgson (CSS 26)
