= Tătărăștii de Jos =

- Commune
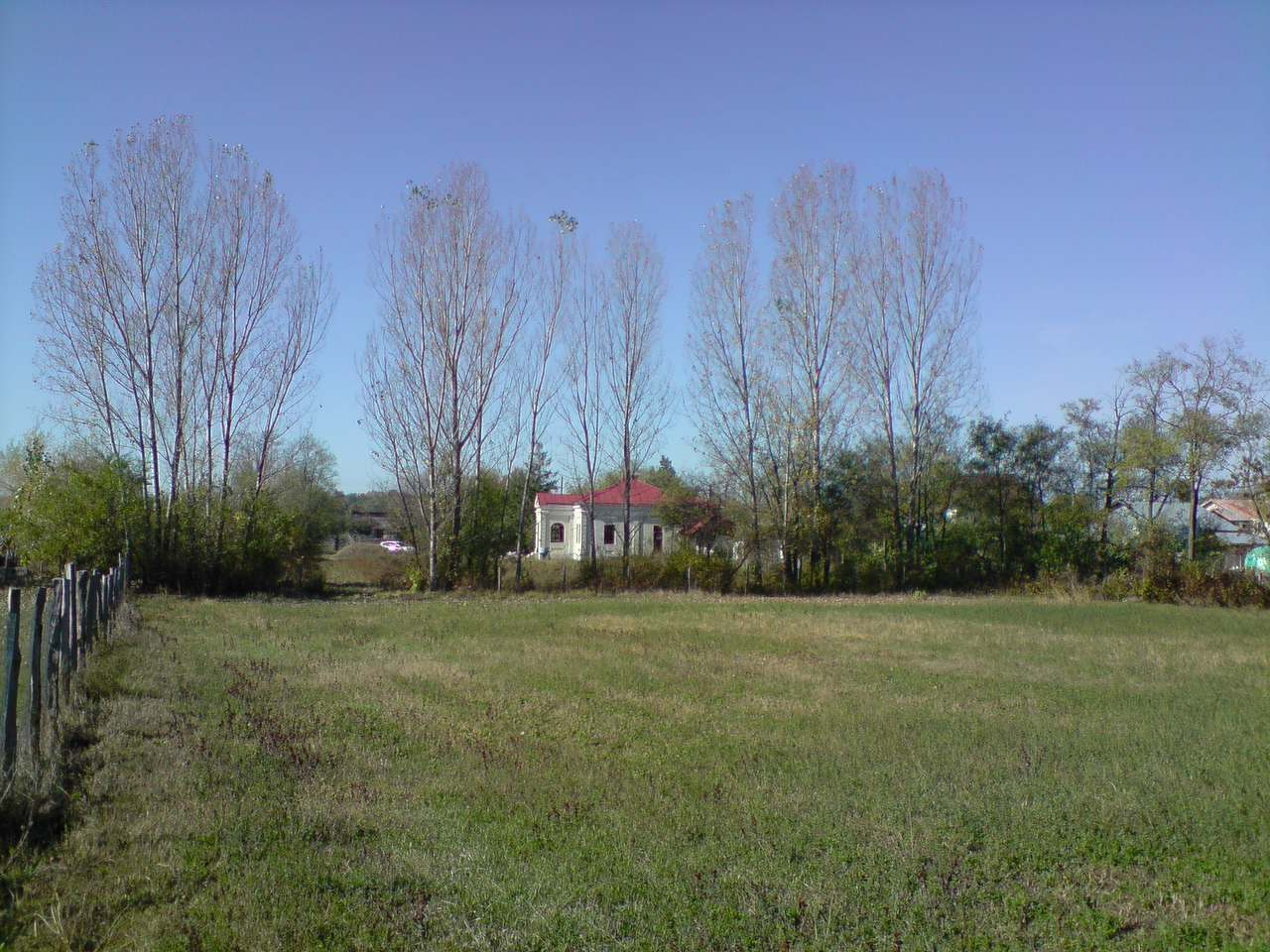
- Aurel Popescu mansion in Tătărăștii de Jos

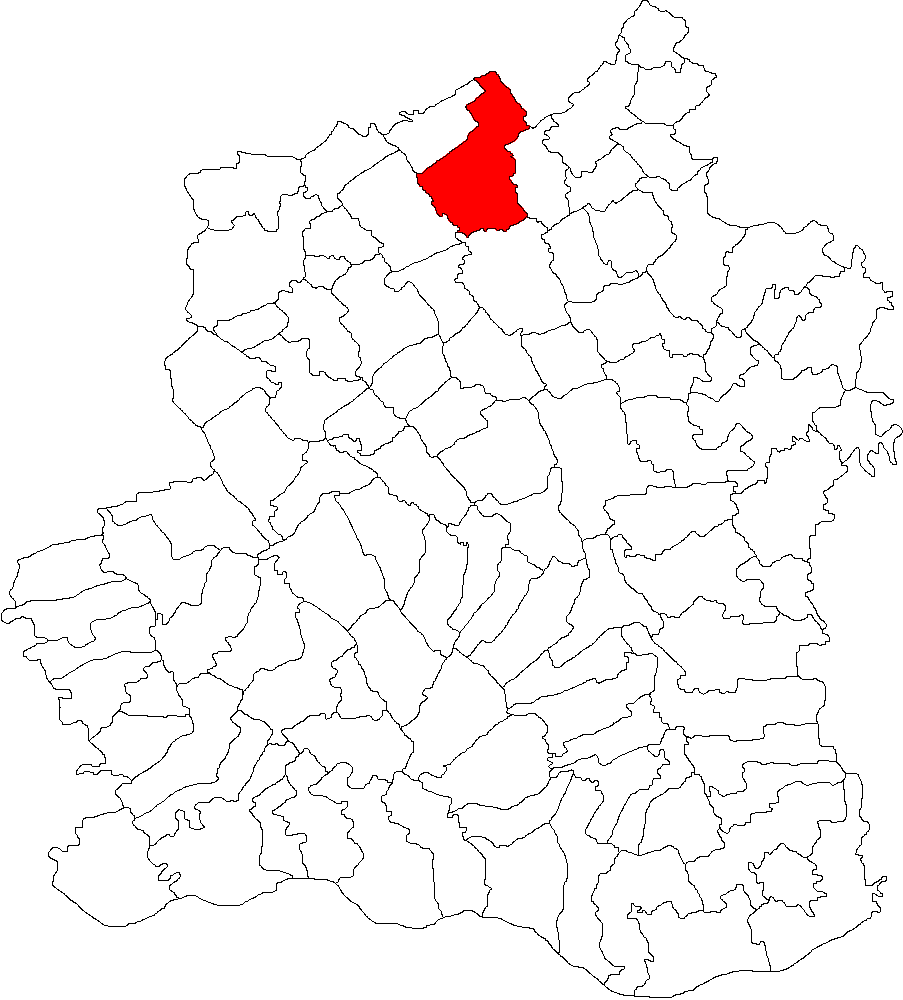
- Location in Teleorman County

- Location in Romania
- Coordinates: 44°22′N 25°11′E
- Country: Romania
- County: Teleorman
- Subdivisions: Lada, Negreni, Negrenii de Sus, Negrenii-Osebiți, Obârtu, Slăvești, Tătărăștii de Jos

Government
  - Mayor (2020–2024): Aurelian Neagoe (PSD)
- Elevation: 116 m (381 ft)
- Population (2021-12-01): 3,162
- Time zone: UTC+02:00 (EET)
  - Summer (DST): UTC+03:00 (EEST)
- Postal code: 147390
- Area code: +(40) 247
- Vehicle reg.: TR
- Website: www.tatarastidejos.ro

Tătărăștii de Jos is a commune in Teleorman County, Muntenia, Romania. It is composed of seven villages: Lada, Negreni, Negrenii de Sus, Negrenii-Osebiți, Obârtu, Slăvești, and Tătărăștii de Jos.

The commune is located in the northern part of Teleorman County, 50 km (31 mi) from the county seat, Alexandria, on the border with Argeș County.
