= Awards and decorations of the National Oceanic and Atmospheric Administration =

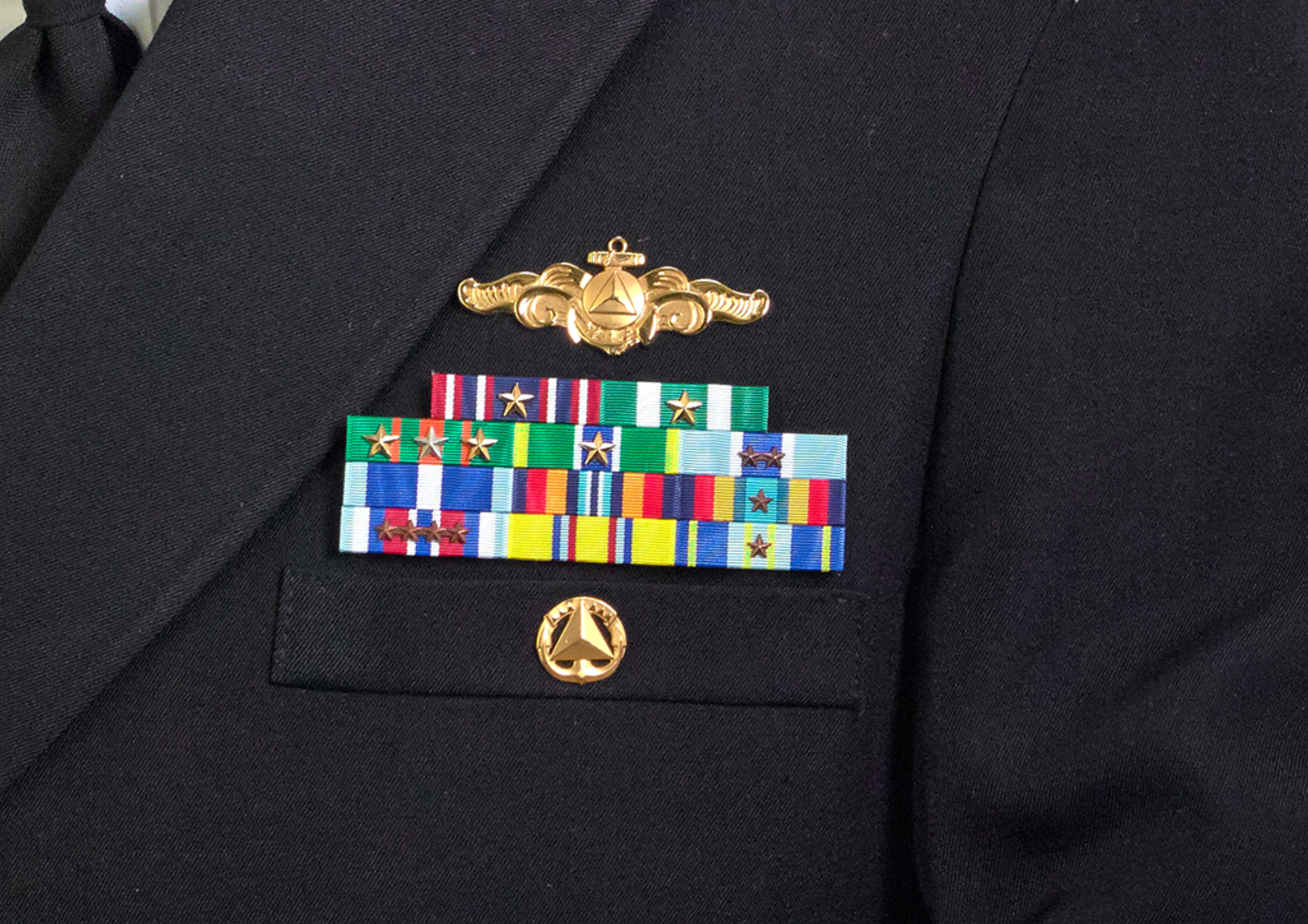
Example: NOAA Corps insignia, badges, and awards

The National Oceanic and Atmospheric Administration Commissioned Officer Corps (or "NOAA Corps"), one of the eight uniformed services of the United States, has the authority to issue various awards and commendations to its members. These include individual honor awards, unit honor awards, service awards, training ribbons and qualification insignia. NOAA Corps awards and decorations include:

== NOAA Corps Insignia ==
=== Command insignia ===
There are three NOAA Command insignia: NOAA Command-at-Sea, NOAA Small-Craft-Command, and NOAA Chief-of-Party.

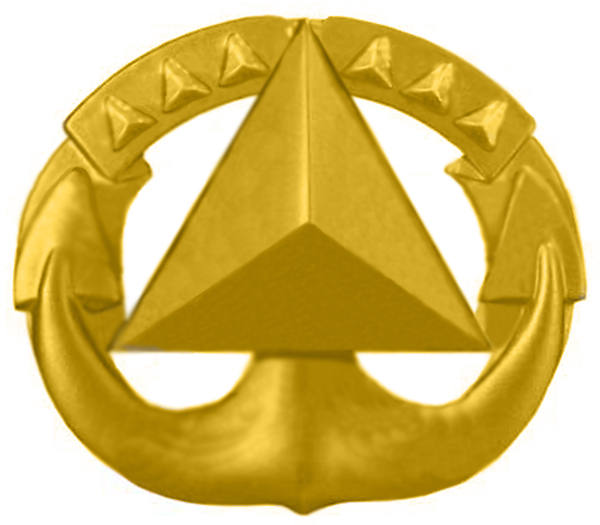
NOAA Command-at-Sea insignia

- NOAA Command-at-Sea Insignia is a gold-colored pin consisting of a triangle superimposed on anchor flukes and an unfurled commissioning pennant showing six triangles. The NOAA Command-at-Sea insignia is authorized for incumbents serving under orders designating them in command of Class 1 through Class 5 NOAA commissioned vessels. A NOAA Corps officer who previously successfully held command (but is not currently in command) of a NOAA commissioned vessel for at least six months during which the vessel was engaged for at least four months in operations at sea, is authorized to wear the Command-at-Sea insignia.

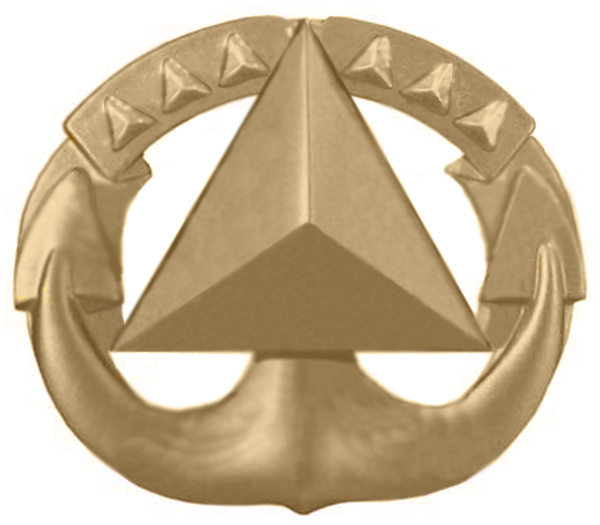
NOAA Small-Craft-Command insignia

- NOAA Small-Craft-Command Insignia is a bronze-colored insignia, of the same design and sizes as the Command-at-Sea insignia. NOAA Corps officers not qualifying for the Command-at-Sea insignia but serving under orders designating them as officer-in-charge or in command of NOAA vessels, greater than 50 feet in length up through Class 6, may wear the Small-Craft-Command insignia. An officer must have been in charge of or held command for at least six months during which the vessel spent four months in field operations, may wear the Small-Craft-Command insignia. This insignia is not worn when the Command-at-Sea insignia is authorized.

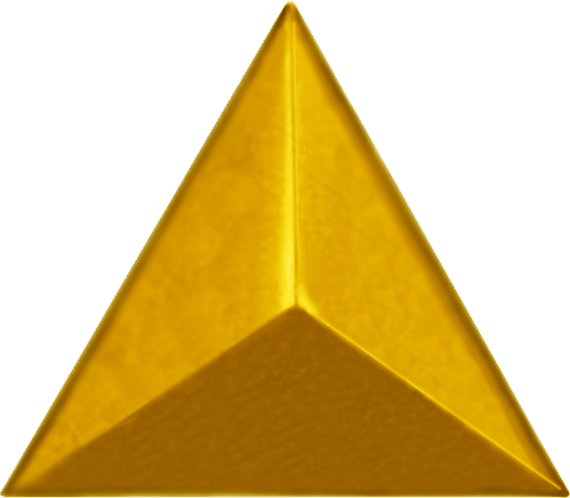
NOAA Chief-of-Party insignia

- NOAA Chief-of-Party Insignia is a gold-colored pin consisting of a raised equilateral triangle. NOAA Chief-of-Party Insignia is authorized for incumbents serving in assignments designating them as Chief-of-Party or equivalent. A NOAA Corps officer who has previously served in an assignment as Chief-of-Party, or equivalent, for at least six months during which the unit was engaged for at least four months in field operations may wear the Chief-of-Party insignia.

For each of the three Command insignia, eligibility to wear them is not attained by a NOAA Corps officer being temporarily or acting in command due to absence, illness or transfer of the designated commanding officer, for periods of less than six continuous months.

An incumbent officer wears insignia centered 1/4 inch above the right breast pocket or pocket flap. When a name tag or ribbon bars are worn on the right breast, the insignia is centered 1/4 inch above them. On the men's Service Dress Blue coat, the insignia is positioned on the right breast as though there were a pocket. On Formal Dress and Dinner Dress Jacket (Blue or White), men wear the insignia centered on the right lapel, 3 inches below the notch; women wear the insignia centered on the right lapel, down one third the distance between the shoulder seam and the coat hem.

A post tour officer wears insignia on the left breast 1/4 inch below the top of the pocket/flap. Only one post-tour command insignia may be worn; the choice of insignia is at the individual's discretion. When wearing two qualification insignia, the command insignia is worn 1/4 inch below the secondary insignia, or on uniforms with pocket flaps, 1/4 inch below the flap.

=== Qualification insignia ===
NOAA Corps officers who have qualified as aviators, divers, submariners, parachutists, etc., or are otherwise entitled to wear a qualification insignia at their discretion. As follows are the qualification insignia awarded by the NOAA.

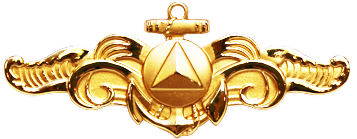
NOAA Deck Officer insignia

- NOAA Deck Officer Insignia is a gold-colored pin displaying breaking waves, with a central device consisting of a fouled anchor surcharged with a NOAA Corps device. NOAA Corps officers certified as Senior Watch Officer may wear the NOAA Deck Officer insignia after authorization by the Director of the NOAA Corps.

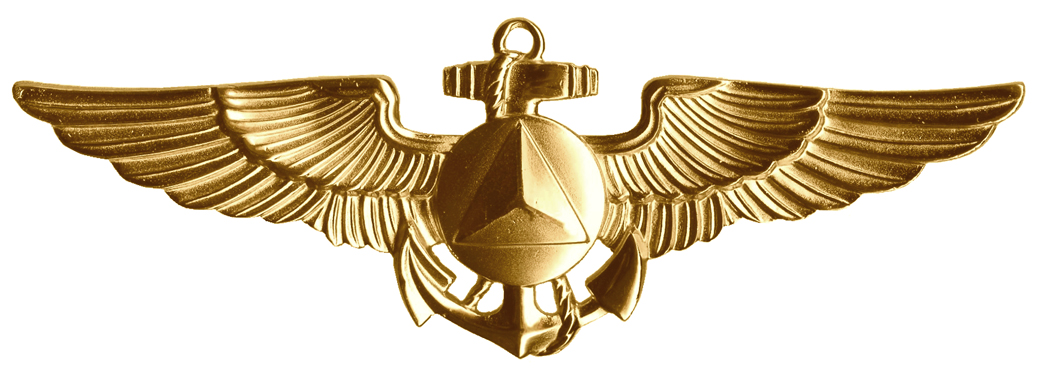
NOAA Aviator insignia

- NOAA Aviator Insignia is a gold-colored pin, winged, with a central device consisting of a fouled anchor surcharged with a NOAA Corps device. NOAA Corps officer pilots and navigators may wear the NOAA aviator insignia after authorization by the Director of the NOAA Corps.

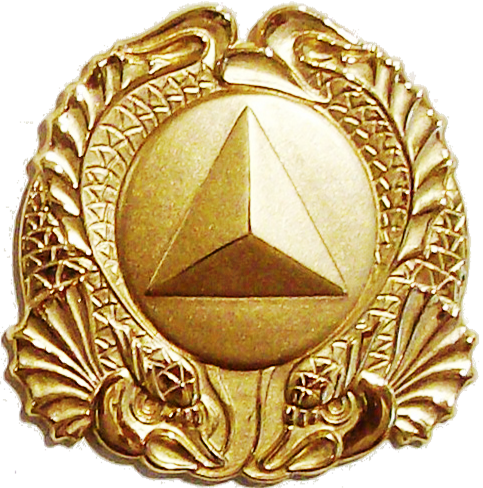
NOAA Diver insignia

- NOAA Diver Insignia is a gold-colored pin consisting of a NOAA Corps device surrounded by two dolphins. NOAA Corps officers qualified as NOAA divers may wear the NOAA diver insignia after authorization by the Director of the NOAA Corps.

NOAA Corps officers with multiple qualifications may wear two insignia, placing one in the primary position and one in the secondary position. Only one insignia from any qualification category (i.e., diver, aviator, etc.) is authorized for wear at the same time.

When wearing the insignia with ribbon bars or medals, the primary insignia is centered above ribbon bars or medals with the lower edge of the device 1/4-inch above the top row of ribbon bars or medals. The secondary insignia is centered below ribbon bars with the top of the device 1/4 inch below the top of the pocket or pocket flap, or centered below medals with the top of the device 1/4 inch below the lowest row of medals.

Without ribbon bars or medals, the primary insignia is centered above the left pocket with the lower edge of the device 1/4 inch above the top of the pocket. In dress uniforms, men center the insignia on the left lapel, 3 inches below the notch; women center the insignia on the left lapel down one-third the distance between the shoulder seam and coat hem. Secondary insignia is centered 1/4 inch below the top of the pocket or pocket flap. On Dinner Dress Jacket uniforms, position the secondary insignia 1/4 inch below the primary insignia. Secondary insignia are not authorized for wear on working uniforms.

== NOAA Corps decorations and awards ==
Members of the NOAA Corps may be authorized to wear awards and decorations presented by the Commerce Department, Defense Department and other uniformed services, the following list is limited to those awards presented by the NOAA Corps.

Personal Decorations
Department of Commerce Gold Medal	Department of Commerce Silver Medal	Department of Commerce Bronze Medal	NOAA Corps Meritorious Service Medal
Awarded for extraordinary achievement supporting critical objectives of the Department of Commerce with significant beneficial effect on the United States or world.	Awarded for achievement supporting critical objectives of the Department of Commerce with significant beneficial effect on the United States.	Awarded for extraordinary achievement supporting specific objectives of the Department of Commerce with beneficial effect on the United States or world.	Awarded for voluntary acts of heroism such as to stand out distinctly above normal expectations, meritorious service worthy of special recognition, and/or outstanding career service worthy of special recognition, in view of an officer’s sustained performance over multiple assignments.
NOAA Administrator's Award	NOAA Corps Commendation Medal	NOAA Corps Achievement Medal	NOAA Corps Director's Ribbon
			Ribbon Only
Awarded for significant contributions in engineering and application, program administration and management, scientific research and achievement, public service, or equal employment opportunity.	The highest honorary award of the NOAA Corps: awarded for significant heroic, meritorious, professional service, or achievement warranting greater recognition than the NOAA Corps Achievement Medal.	Awarded to a NOAA Corps officer or a member of another uniformed service detailed, assigned, or attached to NOAA: for Sustained Superior Performance or for a Special Act.	Awarded to a NOAA Corps officer or a member of another uniformed service detailed, assigned, or attached to NOAA: for noteworthy achievements meriting recognition of lesser extent than the NOAA Corps Achievement Medal.
Unit Awards
NOAA Unit Citation Award	NOAA Meritorious Team Commendation		
Awarded to a group of employees in NOAA, through their individual and collective efforts: for substantive contributions to the programs or objectives for which NOAA was established.	Awarded to recognize groups of individuals who have made substantive contributions to NOAA programs.		
Non-government decorations
NOAA Association of Commissioned Officers (ACO) Award Medal; Junior Officer of the Year	NOAA Association of Commissioned Officers (ACO) Award Medal; Science Award with S Device	NOAA Association of Commissioned Officers (ACO) Award Medal; Engineering Award with E Device	
Awarded annually to a NOAA Corps officer, below the grade of lieutenant commander: for outstanding contributions to NOAA, outstanding performance, and/or the positive reflection cast by the recipient upon the NOAA Corps.	Awarded for an outstanding scientific contribution made by an officer. This award is distinguished from the Junior Officer of the Year Award by a bronze "S" device attached to the large medal, miniature medal, and ribbon bar.	Awarded for an outstanding engineering contribution made by an NOAA Corps officer. This award is distinguished from the Junior Officer of the Year Award by a bronze "E" Device attached to the large medal, miniature medal, and ribbon bar.	
Society of American Military Engineers Colbert Medal with silver Triangle Device	Society of American Military Engineers Karo Award with bronze Triangle Device		
Awarded to a member of the National Ocean Service, officer or civilian, active or retired: for the most outstanding contribution to military engineering through achievement in design, construction, administration, research, or development. Award is made by SAME.	A group award presented annually by SAME to a field unit of the National Ocean Service: for an outstanding contribution in an engineering or scientific field.		
Campaign and Service Awards
NOAA Corps National Response Deployment Medal	NOAA Corps Outstanding Volunteer Service Award Medal	NOAA Sea Service Deployment Ribbon	NOAA Corps Atlantic Service Ribbon
		Ribbon Only	Ribbon Only
Awarded to a member of the NOAA Corps, or a member of another uniformed service detailed, assigned, or attached to NOAA who distinguish themselves by significant participation in national response operations.	Awarded to a member of the NOAA Corps, or a member of another uniformed service detailed, assigned, or attached to NOAA who, subsequent to 1 August 2007, performed outstanding volunteer community service of a sustained, direct and consequential nature.	Retroactive to 1 January 2002, it is awarded for twelve months accumulated sea duty, which may also include temporary duty at sea, that includes at least one 90 consecutive-day deployment.	A service award recognizing a sea duty assignment aboard a NOAA vessel operating in the waters of the Atlantic Ocean, Gulf of Mexico, Great Lakes or adjacent waters.
NOAA Corps Pacific Service Ribbon	NOAA Corps Mobile Duty Service Ribbon	NOAA Corps International Service Ribbon	NOAA Corps National Response Service Ribbon
A service award recognizing a sea duty assignment aboard a NOAA vessel operating in the waters of the Pacific Ocean, Indian Ocean, Bering Sea, or adjacent waters.	A service award recognizing a mobile duty assignment in the United States, its possessions or territories.	A service award recognizing an assignment involving international service aboard ship or on land.	A service award recognizing significant support to NOAA during a period of national emergency.
NOAA Recruiting Achievement Award	NOAA Special Duty Award		
Awarded to officers that complete eight distinct events (recruiting, outreach, or interviews) in [a] 365 consecutive dayperiod.	Awarded in recognition of officers who engage in training activities of officer candidates and officers.		
Qualification Ribbons
NOAA Rifle Ribbon; No longer awarded	NOAA Pistol Ribbon; No longer awarded		
Previously awarded any member of the NOAA Commissioned Corps who successfully completed training in any service-approved qualification course. No device was authorized for wear on the NOAA Corps Rifle Ribbon to denote a specific level of qualification.	Previously awarded any member of the NOAA Commissioned Corps who successfully completed training in any service-approved qualification course. No device was authorized for wear on the NOAA Corps Pistol Ribbon to denote a specific level of qualification.		

=== Ribbon devices ===
Only one of each medal or service ribbon may be worn by NOAA Corps personnel. Subsequent awards are indicated by certain attachments to the medal's suspension ribbon or on the ribbon bar.

- 5/16 Inch Stars - are worn on personal decorations to denote subsequent awards of the same award. A gold star represents a single subsequent award. A silver star is worn in lieu of five gold stars, representing a sixth award of a decoration.
- 3/16 Inch Stars - are worn on unit, service, and awards of non-government societies. A bronze 3/16 inch service star is worn on the ribbon bar to denote subsequent awards. A silver 3/16 inch star is worn in lieu of five bronze stars and represents a sixth award.
- Triangles - 3/16 inch triangles are worn, point up, on three awards worn by NOAA Corps personnel. A bronze 3/16 inch triangle is worn on the ribbon bar of the Society of American Military Engineers Karo Award and a silver 3/16 inch triangle is worn on two other awards; the first is the Society of American Military Engineers Colbert Medal ribbon bar, the second is the NOAA Corps International Service Ribbon to denote an overseas Permanent Change of Station tour outside of the United States, its possessions and territories.
- "S" - A bronze 3/16 inch "S" is worn on the NOAA ACO medal suspension ribbon and ribbon bar to denote the ACO Science Award.
- "E" - A bronze 3/16 inch "E" is worn on the NOAA ACO medal suspension ribbon and ribbon bar to denote the ACO Engineering Award.

== NOAA incentive awards (without medal or ribbon) ==
- NOAA Technology Transfer Award
- NOAA Distinguished Career Award

== United States Coast and Geodetic Survey awards and decorations ==
The original ancestor organization of the NOAA Corps, the United States Coast and Geodetic Survey Corps, existed from 1917 to 1965, then went through a transitional period as the Environmental Science Services Administration Corps (ESSA Corps) from 1965 to 1970 before becoming the NOAA Corps. Like NOAA Corps personnel today, Coast and Geodetic Survey Corps officers, as well as other Coast and Geodetic Survey personnel such as civilian ship's officers and crew members, were eligible for the Department of Commerce awards described above, as well as awards such as the above-mentioned Colbert and Karo Medals and the awards and decorations of other uniformed services with which they served. However, although the Coast and Geodetic Survey traced its history to 1807, it had no awards of its own until 21 July 1945, when President Harry S. Truman signed Executive Order 9590, authorizing six awards in recognition of Coast and Geodetic Survey service during World War II, the national emergency preceding it, or its aftermath.

For budgetary reasons, Executive Order 9590 established the awards as ribbons only, but it also authorized the United States Secretary of Commerce to "provide and issue an appropriate medal, with suitable appurtenances, to the recipient of any ribbon at such time as he may determine, and when necessary funds are available therefore." However, it was not until after the United States Congress passed the Merchant Marine Decorations and Medals Act in 1988 that NOAA, as the Coast and Geodetic Survey's successor organization, took action to create a medal for each of the awards. Later in 1988, via NOAA Corps Bulletin 880401, NOAA authorized medals to supplement the ribbons previously awarded. Although obsolete, the six Coast and Geodetic Survey medals are part of the history and heritage of NOAA and the NOAA Corps:

US Coast and Geodetic Survey Awards
Coast and Geodetic Survey Distinguished Service Medal	Coast and Geodetic Survey Meritorious Service Medal	Coast and Geodetic Survey Good Conduct Medal	Coast and Geodetic Survey Defense Service Medal
Awarded to any Coast and Geodetic Survey commissioned officer or to any ship's officer or member of the crew of any Coast and Geodetic Survey ship who distinguished himself by outstanding conduct or service in the line of duty between 8 September 1939 and 28 April 1952.	Awarded to any Coast and Geodetic Survey commissioned officer or to any ship's officer or member of the crew of any Coast and Geodetic Survey ship who rendered service of a meritorious character between 8 September 1939 and 28 April 1952 but not of such an outstanding character as would warrant an award of the Coast and Geodetic Survey Distinguished Service Ribbon.	Awarded to enlisted members of the crews of Coast and Geodetic Survey vessels for exemplary behavior, efficiency, and fidelity during service between 8 September 1939 and 28 April 1952.	Awarded to any Coast and Geodetic Survey commissioned officer or to any ship's officer or member of the crew of any Coast and Geodetic Survey ship who served at any time during the period between 8 September 1939 and 6 December 1941.
Coast and Geodetic Survey Atlantic War Zone Medal	Coast and Geodetic Survey Pacific War Zone Medal		
Awarded to any Coast and Geodetic Survey commissioned officer or to any ship's officer or member of the crew of any Coast and Geodetic Survey ship who served outside the continental limits of the United States in the Atlantic War Zone between 7 December 1941 and 8 November 1945.	Awarded to any Coast and Geodetic Survey commissioned officer or to any ship's officer or member of the crew of any Coast and Geodetic Survey ship who served outside the continental limits of the United States in the Pacific War Zone between 7 December 1941 and 2 March 1946.		

== See also ==
- Uniformed services of the United States
- National Oceanic and Atmospheric Administration Commissioned Corps
- United States Coast and Geodetic Survey
- Military badges of the United States
- Awards and decorations of the United States military
- Obsolete badges of the United States military
