= Don A. Jones =

United States Coast Guard admiral

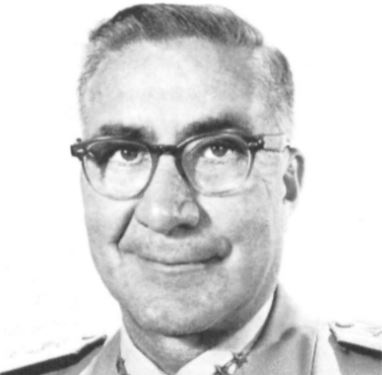
- Born: 16 September 1912; Waldron, Michigan, United States
- Died: 6 August 2000 (aged 87); Seattle, Washington, United States
- Burial place: Lake View Cemetery, Seattle
- Military career
- Allegiance: United States
- Branch: United States Coast and Geodetic Survey Corps (1940–1942); United States Army (1942–1944); Office of Strategic Services (1944–1946); United States Coast and Geodetic Survey Corps (1946–1965); Environmental Science Services Administration Corps (1965–1970); NOAA Commissioned Officer Corps (1970–1972)
- Rank: Rear Admiral
- Commands: USC&GS Surveyor (OSS 32); U.S. Coast and Geodetic Survey; Environmental Science Services Administration Corps; National Ocean Survey
- Conflicts: World War II; Cold War
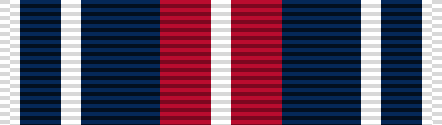
- Awards: Department of Commerce Gold Medal (1962)

Rear Admiral Don A. Jones (16 September 1912 – 6 August 2000) was an officer in the United States Coast and Geodetic Survey Corps, its successor, the Environmental Science Services Administration Corps (ESSA Corps), and the ESSA Corps's successor, the National Oceanic and Atmospheric Administration Commissioned Officer Corps (NOAA Corps). He served simultaneously as the second and last Director of the ESSA Corps, one of only two people to hold the position, and as the seventh and last Director of the United States Coast and Geodetic Survey.

During World War II, Jones was transferred to the United States Army and later the Office of Strategic Services before returning to the Coast and Geodetic Survey Corps.

== Early life ==
Don Arden Jones was born in Waldron, Michigan, on 16 September 1912. He attended Michigan State University, from which he graduated with a degree in civil engineering in 1933.

== Career ==
=== Early career ===
In 1933, Jones began his career in the United States Coast and Geodetic Survey as a civilian employee. In 1940, he accepted a commission as an ensign in the United States Coast and Geodetic Survey Corps.

=== World War II ===
The United States entered World War II with the Japanese attack on Pearl Harbor on 7 December 1941, and in 1942 Jones was transferred to the United States Army for wartime service. The Army assigned him to duty in the United States Army Coast Artillery Corps, in which he served as a staff officer, as a surveying and mapping officer, and as the commander of an Army mineplanter responsible for laying underwater mines.

In 1944, Jones was transferred to the Office of Strategic Services (OSS). He served in the OSS through the end of the war in August 1945 and post-war until 1946.

During his Army and OSS service, Jones rose from the rank of ensign to lieutenant commander.

=== Later career ===
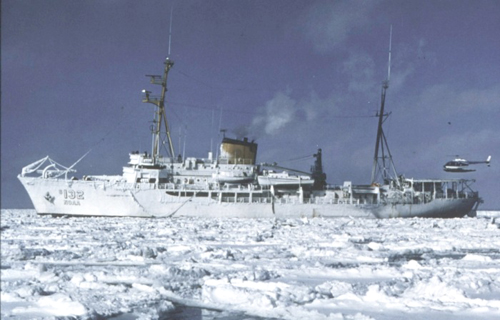
The ocean survey ship USC&GS Surveyor (OSS 32) conducting helicopter operations in the Bering Sea. Jones was her executive officer and later her commanding officer while serving aboard her from 1963 to 1965.

Jones returned to duty as a Coast and Geodetic Survey Corps officer in 1946. Between 1946 and 1957, he had duty aboard various survey ships of the Coast and Geodetic Survey fleet and conducted combined geodetic control, hydrographic, and photogrammetric surveys. In 1957, he was transferred to duty in the United States Department of State and was placed in charge of a geodetic control project in Ethiopia which established ground control for the mapping of water resources in the drainage basin of the Blue Nile River. He completed his work in Ethiopia in 1961. In 1962, the Coast and Geodetic Survey's parent agency, the United States Department of Commerce, awarded him the Department of Commerce Gold Medal as an Exceptional Service Award for his efforts in Ethiopia.

Returning to the United States in 1961, Jones served as Chief of the Coast and Geodetic Survey's Division of Geodesy for two years. In July 1963, he began a sea tour aboard the ocean survey ship USC&GS Surveyor (OSS 32), first as her executive officer for a year and then as her commanding officer. Surveyor conducted operations in the North Pacific Ocean, off Hawaii, and off Alaska during his tour. By November 1964, he had reached the rank of captain.

On 13 July 1965, while Jones was serving aboard Surveyor, a new United States Government scientific organization, the Environmental Science Services Administration (ESSA) was created. Under the reorganization that created ESSA, both the Coast and Geodetic Survey and the United States Weather Bureau, although retaining their independent identities, came under the control of ESSA, and the Coast and Geodetic Survey Corps was removed from the Coast and Geodetic Survey and subordinated directly to ESSA, becoming the Environmental Science Services Administration Corps (ESSA Corps). As of that date, Jones became an officer of the new ESSA Corps.

Jones left Surveyor in November 1965. In 1966, he became the associate director of the Coast and Geodetic Survey's Office of Hydrography and Oceanography. Promoted to rear admiral, he was the Associate Administrator of ESSA from 1 January 1967 to September 1968.

=== Director ===
In September 1968, Jones became the seventh and last Director of the Coast and Geodetic Survey. Simultaneously, he became the last Director of the ESSA Corps, one of only two people ever to hold that position.

On 3 October 1970, ESSA was abolished and replaced by the National Oceanic and Atmospheric Administration (NOAA). The ESSA Corps became the new National Oceanic and Atmospheric Administration Commissioned Officer Corps (NOAA Corps), and Jones became a NOAA Corps officer. Under the reorganization that accompanied the creation of NOAA, the Coast and Geodetic Survey was abolished and its functions were transferred to various parts of the new NOAA organization. Under the new organization, President Richard Nixon appointed Jones as Acting Director of the new National Ocean Service on 26 October 1970. The United States Senate confirmed him in this position on 19 February 1971, making him permanent Director of the National Ocean Service. He served in this position until his retirement.

Jones retired from NOAA on 30 April 1972.

== Awards ==
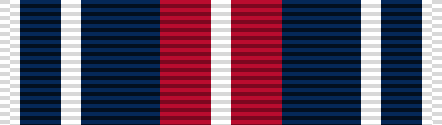
Department of Commerce Gold Medal

In a ceremony on 14 February 1962 in Washington, D.C., Jones was awarded the Department of Commerce Gold Medal "for rare and outstanding contribution of major significance to the Department of Commerce while serving as Chief of a Geodetic Control Project establishing surveys in the remote area of the Blue Nile River Basin of Ethiopia from 1957 to 1961."

== Personal and professional life ==
Jones married the former Frances Dean Lutz (28 February 1919 – 19 February 2007), a native of Port Angeles, Washington, on 7 November 1964. The couple moved to the Washington, D.C., area in 1965 and resided in Rockville, Maryland. After Rear Admiral Jones retired, the couple moved back to Washington state, residing first in Lake Crescent – where Don Jones organized and served as the first president of the Friends of Lake Crescent – before settling in Shoreline. They traveled extensively in retirement.

Rear Admiral Jones had three children by a previous marriage, Alicia E. Jones (later Alicia E. Boyd), Radford W. Jones, and Donna L. Jones (later Donna L. Borkowski).

Jones was a member of numerous professional organizations and was widely published in geodetic journals. He was a graduate of the Armed Forces Staff College.

== Death ==
Jones died on 6 August 2000. He is buried along with Frances Jones at Lake View Cemetery in Seattle, Washington.

Military offices
Preceded by James C. Tison, Jr.	Director, United States Coast and Geodetic Survey; 1968–1970	Succeeded by none
Preceded by James C. Tison, Jr.	Director, Environmental Science Services Administration Corps; 1968–1970	Succeeded by none
