= James Tyson (disambiguation) =

James Tyson was an Australian pastoralist.

James Tyson or similar may refer to:

- Jim Bell Tyson
- James Tison
