= NOAAS Surveyor =

U.S. oceanographic survey ship

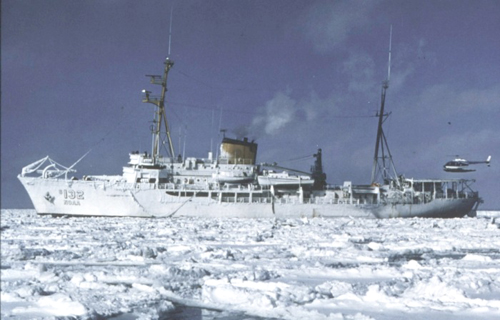
- Surveyor conducting helicopter operations in the Bering Sea

History

United States
- Name: USC&GS Surveyor (OSS 32)
- Namesake: A surveyor is a member of the profession of surveying, which determines positions on the earth's surface
- Builder: National Steel and Shipbuilding Company, San Diego, California
- Launched: 25 April 1959
- Sponsored by: Mrs. H. Arnold Karo
- Commissioned: 30 April 1960
- Home port: Seattle, Washington
- Fate: Transferred to National Oceanic and Atmospheric Administration 3 October 1970

United States
- Name: NOAAS Surveyor (S 132)
- Namesake: Previous name retained
- Acquired: Transferred from U.S. Coast and Geodetic Survey 3 October 1970
- Decommissioned: 29 September 1995
- Home port: Seattle, Washington
- Identification: IMO number: 5345742; Callsign: WTES
- Nickname(s): "Old Workhorse"

General characteristics
- Type: Oceanographic survey ship
- Tonnage: 2,653 gross tons; 682 net tons
- Displacement: 3,440 tons (full load)
- Length: 292 ft 2 in (89.05 m)
- Beam: 46 ft (14 m)
- Draft: 19 ft 5 in (5.92 m)
- Installed power: 3,200 shaft horsepower (2.4 megawatts)
- Propulsion: Two sets Laval geared steam turbines, two Combustion Engineering boilers, one shaft, 785 tons fuel
- Speed: 15 knots (28 km/h) (sustained)
- Range: 13,680 nautical miles (25,340 km)
- Endurance: 38 days
- Boats & landing craft carried: 3 × 36-foot (11-meter) wooden survey launches; 1 × ex-United States Navy LCVP; 2 × 26-foot (7.9-meter) motor whaleboats
- Complement: 92 (12 NOAA Corps officers, 6 civilian officers, 58 crew members, 16 scientists)
- Aviation facilities: Helicopter pad
- Notes: 800 kilowatts electrical power; Last steam-powered Coast and Geodetic Survey ship; First Coast and Geodetic Survey ship with a deep-water multi-beam echosounder

NOAA Ship Surveyor (S 132) was an oceanographic survey ship in commission in the National Oceanic and Atmospheric Administration (NOAA) from 1970 until 1995. Prior to her NOAA career, she was in commission in the United States Coast and Geodetic Survey from 1960 to 1970 as USC&GS Surveyor (OSS 32). She was the second and last Coast and Geodetic Survey ship named Surveyor and has been the only NOAA ship thus far to bear the name.

== Construction and characteristics ==
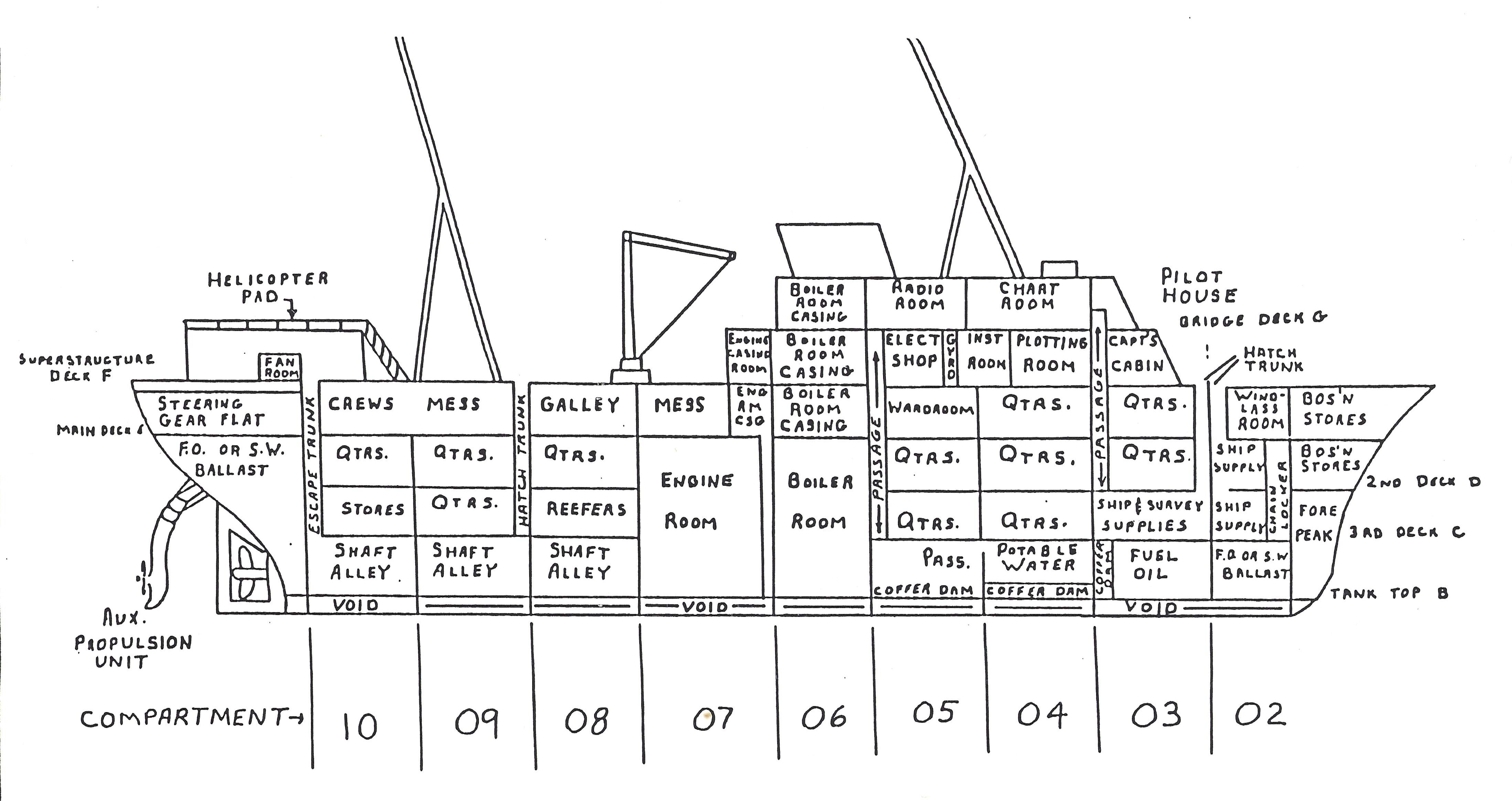
Drawing showing the compartment layout of the NOAAS Surveyor, circa 1994.

Surveyor was built as an "ocean survey ship" (OSS) for the U.S. Coast and Geodetic Survey by National Steel and Shipbuilding Company in San Diego, California, and launched on 25 April 1959, sponsored by Mrs. H. Arnold Karo. She was the last steam-powered ship built for the Coast and Geodetic Survey, and the first to be equipped with a deep-water multi-beam echosounder. Her construction marked the beginning of a major effort to modernize the Coast and Geodetic Survey fleet and make it capable of conducting operations worldwide.

In addition to the deep-water echosounder, Surveyor had a shallow-water echosounder, a stabilized mapping sonar system, a Hydroplot data-processing system, a data-processing computer, seismic reflection profile processors, and an extensive suite of navigation equipment, as well as a wet and dry oceanography laboratory, a gravimetric laboratory, and a photographic laboratory.

By the 1990s, Surveyor was unique in a number of ways. Perhaps the biggest was that she was a steam-powered ship. As a result, she had both an engine room and a boiler room with two three story boilers; one providing steam for her impulse turbine and the other providing steam for ship's service generators.

Impulse turbines are controlled through the use of engine-room throttle valve settings which produce different velocities and volumes in steam consumption. These settings cause changes in boiler conditions. Maneuvering operations could be quite dangerous and difficult for those who changed the boilers' burner barrels and tips. These crew-members are known as "firemen". Maneuvering operations involve frequent replacement of the hot burners and various sizes of tips to adjust for throttle valve settings. However, Surveyor reduced the need for this by use of a "harbor master" – an electric motor with propeller that could be lowered into the water from the stern. This propeller could be rotated and could produce enough thrust to move the stern during low speed maneuvering. As a result, Surveyor could dock without the assistance of tugs or other vessels.

Top speed at that time was around 13 knots, possibly due to a damaged reduction gear within her transmission that caused a distinctive vibration in the ship while underway. Due to the low position of her engine within her hull, she had generally good seakeeping qualities and rode well even in some of the roughest seas, although like other such single propeller ships, she could shutter significantly when the top of her propeller would break the surface of the water while pitching in heavy seas. While endurance was rated at 38 days, in reality she could safely remain at sea for around 32 days as the consumption of fuel and stores would reduce her weight significantly enough to impair her stability in the heavier seas she often found herself in near the end of her service. Also, unlike other ships of the fleet that used primarily diesel fuel, Surveyor primarily used Bunker C fuel oil, although JP4 was also used due to greater availability.

== Operational career ==
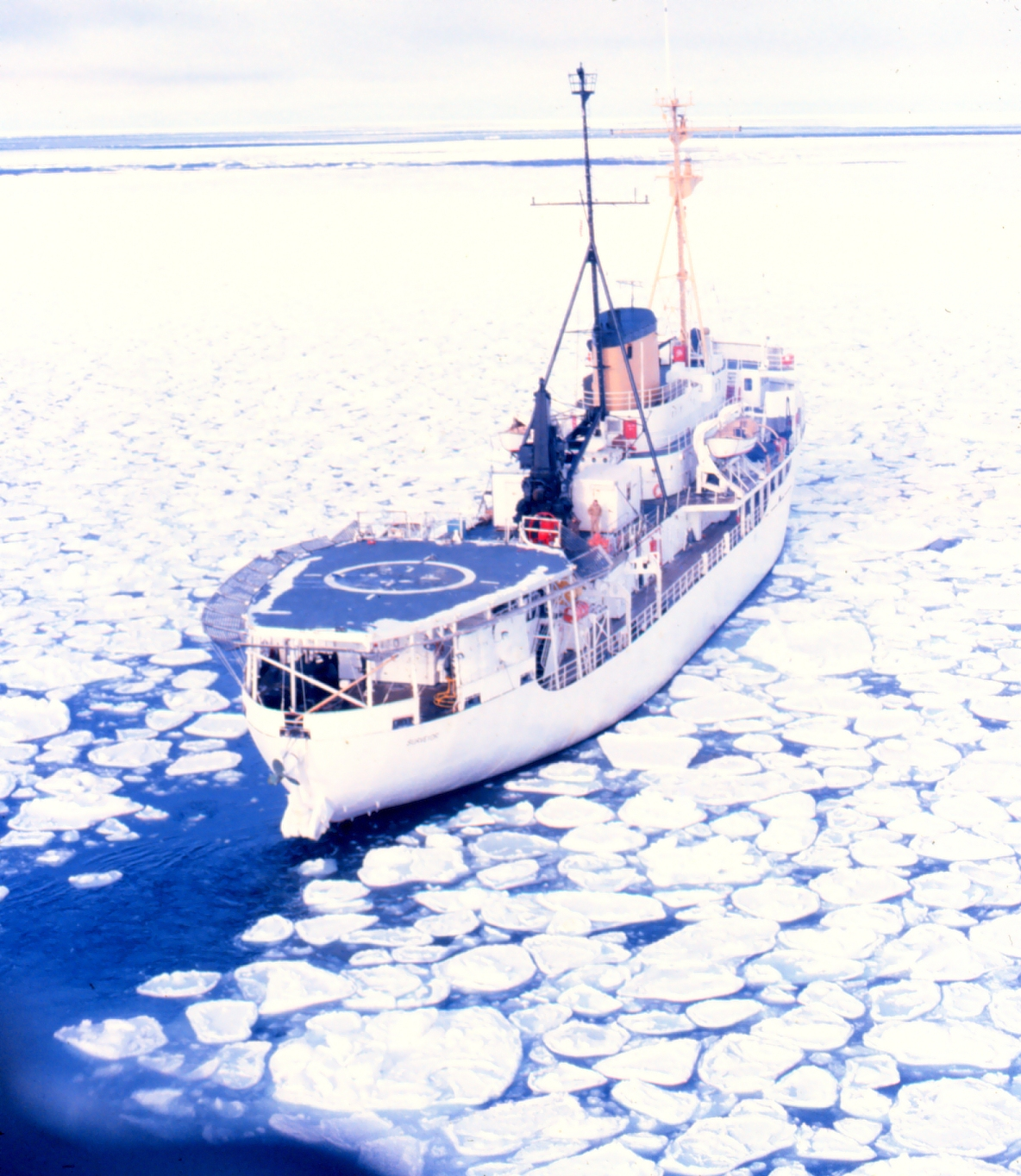
NOAAS Surveyor (S 132) picks her way through ice in the Bering Sea off Alaska in May 1981.

USC&GS Surveyor (OSS 32) was commissioned into service with the Coast and Geodetic Survey on April 30, 1960. When NOAA was created on 3 October 1970 and took over the Coast and Geodetic Survey's fleet, she became a part of the NOAA fleet as NOAAS Surveyor (S 132).

Based at Seattle, Washington, and nicknamed "Old Workhouse," Surveyor spent her career in the Pacific Ocean and Arctic Ocean, operating as far north as the Beaufort Sea off Alaska and as far south as the Palmer Peninsula in Antarctica; she conducted hydrographic surveys in such widely separated areas as Norton Sound in Alaska and American Samoa. She was the primary ship for studying the Alaskan Arctic for the Outer Continental Shelf Environmental Assessment Program (OCSEAP) and for studying Antarctic Marine Living Resources (AMLR.) She also conducted multi-beam echosounder surveys along the West Coast of the United States, off the southern coast of Alaska, throughout the Juan de Fuca Ridge area off the coast of Washington and British Columbia, and in Hawaiian waters. She discovered Axial Seamount on Endeavor Ridge, a seamount that apparently has been split in half by seafloor spreading.

On 6 March 1980, while Surveyor was tied to a pier in San Francisco, California, one of her crewmen fell over the side into the water between the ship and the pier. Without hesitation another crewman, Able-Bodied Seaman Wallace K. Kanahele, leaped into the water, rescued the man—who was suffering from hypothermia—and brought him to a small boat which had been lowered by another vessel. For saving his shipmate's life, Kanahele received the Department of Commerce Gold Medal in 1980.

NOAA decommissioned Surveyor in a ceremony in Seattle on 29 September 1995.

== Post-decommissioning ==
After her decommissioning, ex-Surveyor was moved to Seattle's Lake Washington Ship Canal, where she was decontaminated near the Ballard Locks by USS, Ltd., of Bend, Oregon. As part of the contract for decontaminating Surveyor, USS took possession of her and arranged for her sale to a private party.

After spending several years near the Ballard Locks, ex-Surveyor was moved to the Tyee Marina in Commencement Bay at Tacoma, Washington, where she remained as of April 2015, apparently serving as a windbreak for the marina under the designation OSS 2. She was registered with the United States Coast Guard through 30 April 2018.

Sometime between mid-2016 and early 2018, OSS 2 was moved to New Westminster on the Fraser River in British Columbia, Canada, at the approximate location 49.213926°N 122.880144°W, where she was moored near the former NOAAS Miller Freeman, a fisheries and oceanographic research ship which NOAA had decommissioned and sold in 2013. By early January 2019, OSS 2 and the former Miller Freeman both had been moved to Maple Ridge, British Columbia, also on the Fraser River, where they were moored side by side.

As of June 2019, the United States Coast Guard′s registration database listed OSS 2 as an active pleasure craft registered in Canada. (Note: Further information on Surveyor′s status can be found in the United States Coast Guard's registration database, the Port State Information Exchange, by entering the callsign "WTES" in the search box.)

== Commemoration ==
The Surveyor fracture zone, Surveyor Gap, and Surveyor Seachannel all are named for Surveyor.
