= Wright Township, Hillsdale County, Michigan =

Wright Township, Michigan
- Civil township
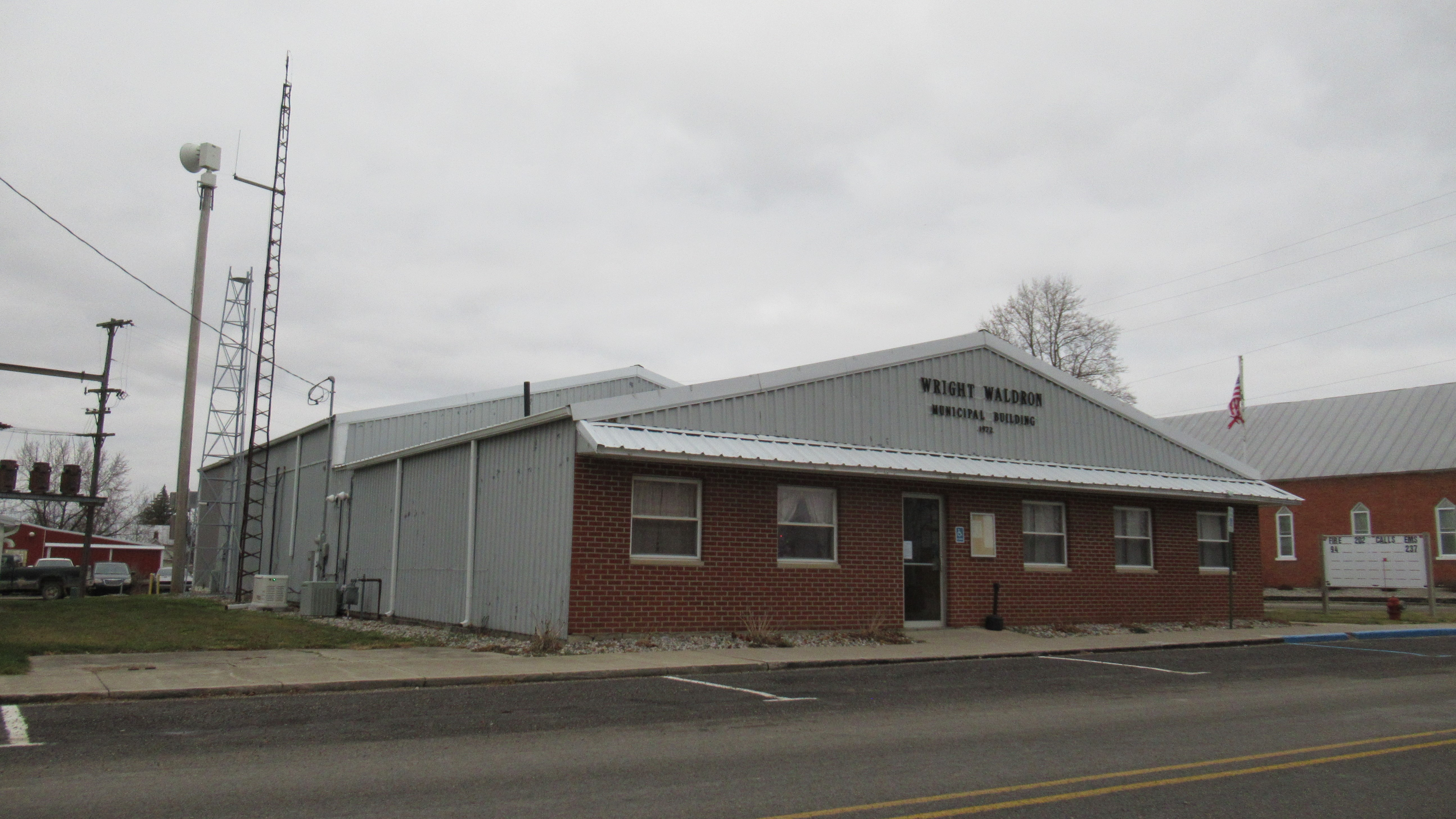
- Wright Township Municipal Building

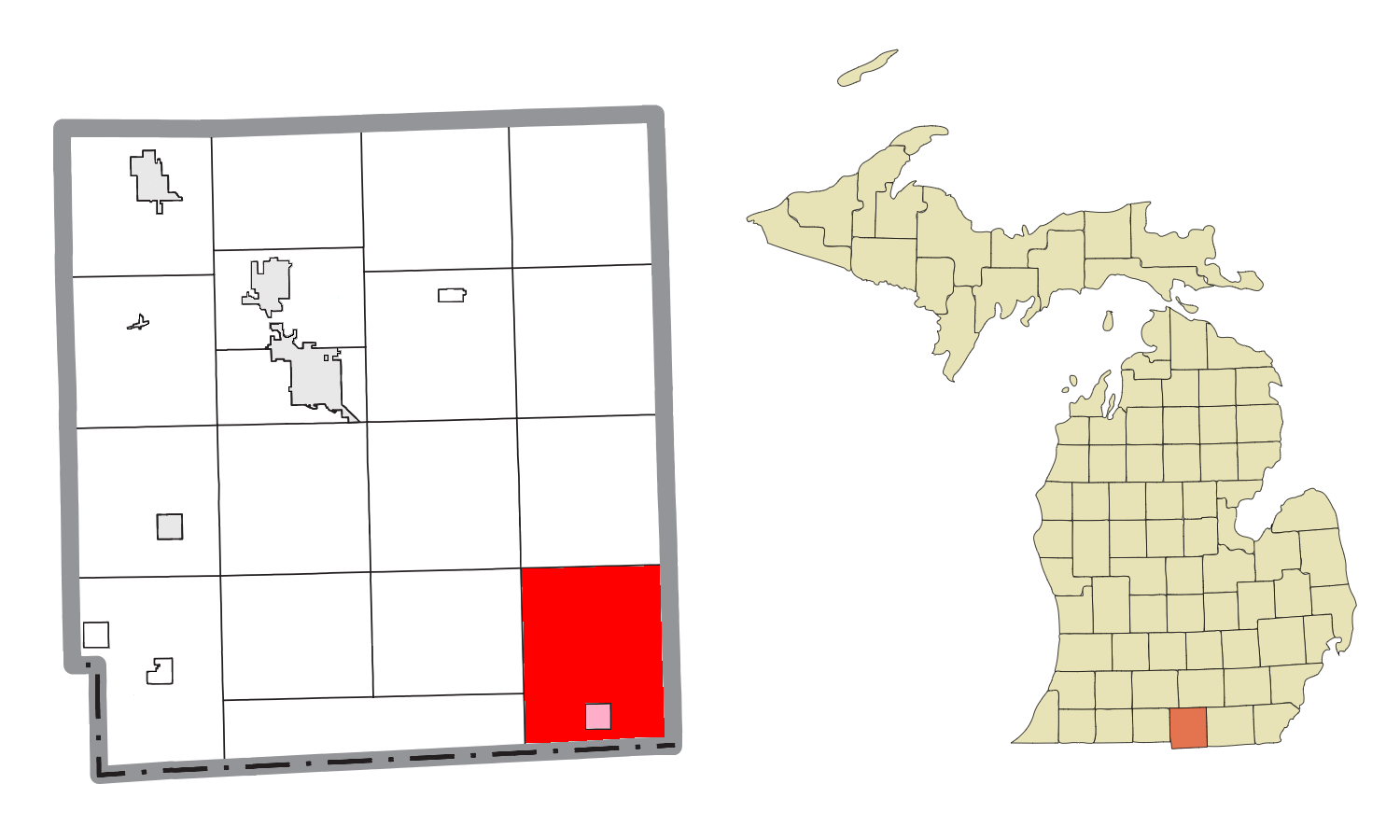
- Location within Hillsdale County (red) and the administered village of Waldron (pink)

- Location within the state of Michigan Location within the United States
- Coordinates: 41°45′46″N 84°24′48″W
- Country: United States
- State: Michigan
- County: Hillsdale
- Established: 1838

Government
  - Supervisor: Frederick Horwath
  - Clerk: Maghann Zimmerman

Area
  - Total: 43.52 sq mi (112.72 km^{2})
  - Land: 43.35 sq mi (112.28 km^{2})
  - Water: 0.17 sq mi (0.44 km^{2})
- Elevation: 909 ft (277 m)

Population (2020)
  - Total: 1,542
  - Density: 35.6/sq mi (13.7/km^{2})
- Time zone: UTC-5 (Eastern (EST))
  - Summer (DST): UTC-4 (EDT)
- ZIP code(s): 49288 (Waldron)
- Area code: 517
- FIPS code: 26-88780
- GNIS feature ID: 1627292

Wright Township is a civil township of Hillsdale County in the U.S. state of Michigan. The population was 1,542 at the 2020 census.

== Communities ==
- Betzer is an unincorporated community in the western portion of the township on the boundary with Ransom Township at 41°45′11″N 84°28′33″W. The community was named after the Daniel Colbetzer, who served as the first postmaster when a post office opened here on November 15, 1886. The post office operated until December 31, 1901.
- Cass is a former settlement within the township, and a post office began operating here on August 3, 1848. The post office was renamed to Prattville on January 26, 1872.
- Lickly Corners is an unincorporated community located within the township at 41°47′47″N 84°27′30″W.
- Prattville is an unincorporated community in the northeast portion of the township at 41°46′56″N 84°23′59″W. The community was founded by brothers Henry and Wellington Pratt, who moved here from Framingham, Massachusetts in 1866 and built a mill and store. The Cass post office was renamed Prattville in their honor on January 26, 1872 but is no longer in operation.
- Waldron is a village in the south-central portion of the township near the Ohio state border at 41°43′35″N 84°25′05″W.

== History ==
The Coman family were the first settlers in the area beginning in 1835. By 1838, the residents petitioned for their own township named Coman Township. However, a clerical error ended up with the newly established township being named Canaan Township. The township was renamed to Wright in 1844.

== Geography ==
According to the U.S. Census Bureau, the township has a total area of 43.52 square miles (112.72 km^{2}), of which 43.35 square miles (112.28 km^{2}) is land and 0.17 square miles (0.44 km^{2}) (0.39%) is water.

=== Major highways ===
- US 127 forms the entire eastern boundary of the township with Lenawee County.

== Demographics ==
As of the census of 2000, there were 1,788 people, 667 households, and 492 families residing in the township. The population density was 41.3 inhabitants per square mile (15.9/km^{2}). There were 776 housing units at an average density of 17.9 per square mile (6.9/km^{2}). The racial makeup of the township was 97.76% White, 0.22% African American, 0.67% Native American, 0.06% Asian, 0.06% from other races, and 1.23% from two or more races. Hispanic or Latino of any race were 1.01% of the population.

There were 667 households, out of which 34.5% had children under the age of 18 living with them, 59.7% were married couples living together, 9.4% had a female householder with no husband present, and 26.2% were non-families. 22.3% of all households were made up of individuals, and 10.2% had someone living alone who was 65 years of age or older. The average household size was 2.68 and the average family size was 3.13.

In the township the population was spread out, with 28.5% under the age of 18, 7.8% from 18 to 24, 28.1% from 25 to 44, 22.7% from 45 to 64, and 12.9% who were 65 years of age or older. The median age was 36 years. For every 100 females, there were 99.6 males. For every 100 females age 18 and over, there were 98.0 males.

The median income for a household in the township was $36,591, and the median income for a family was $41,563. Males had a median income of $30,428 versus $21,250 for females. The per capita income for the township was $16,235. About 9.6% of families and 12.6% of the population were below the poverty line, including 18.4% of those under age 18 and 11.0% of those age 65 or over.

== Education ==
The township is served by three separate public school districts. The township has its own school district, Waldron Area Schools, which serves the majority of the township and smaller portions of several adjacent townships. The northwest corner of the township is served by Pittsford Area Schools to the north in Pittsford. A very small portion of the northeast corner of the township is served by Hudson Area Schools to the northeast in Hudson in Lenawee County.

== Images ==
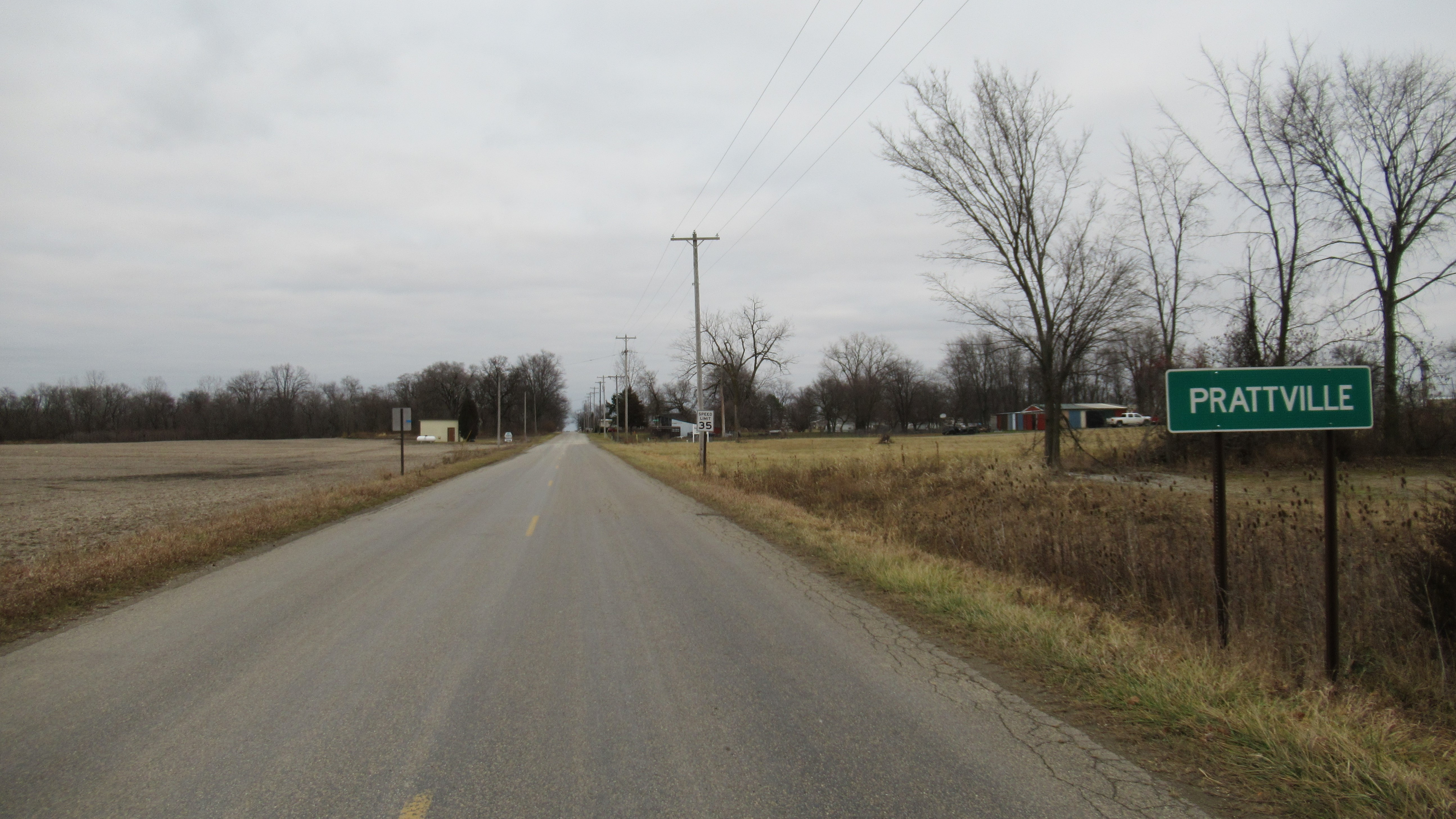
Prattville road signage

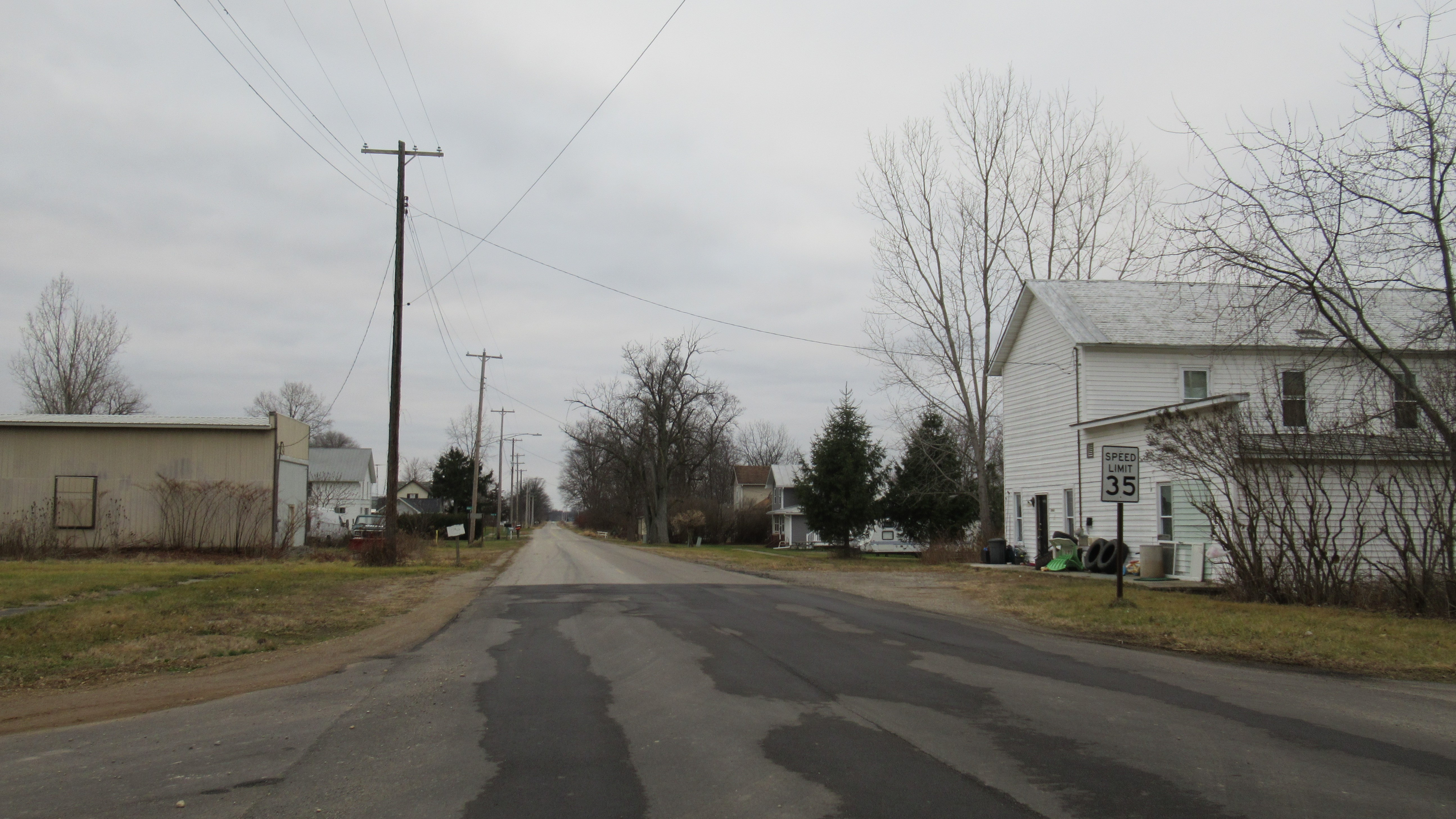
Unincorporated community of Prattville

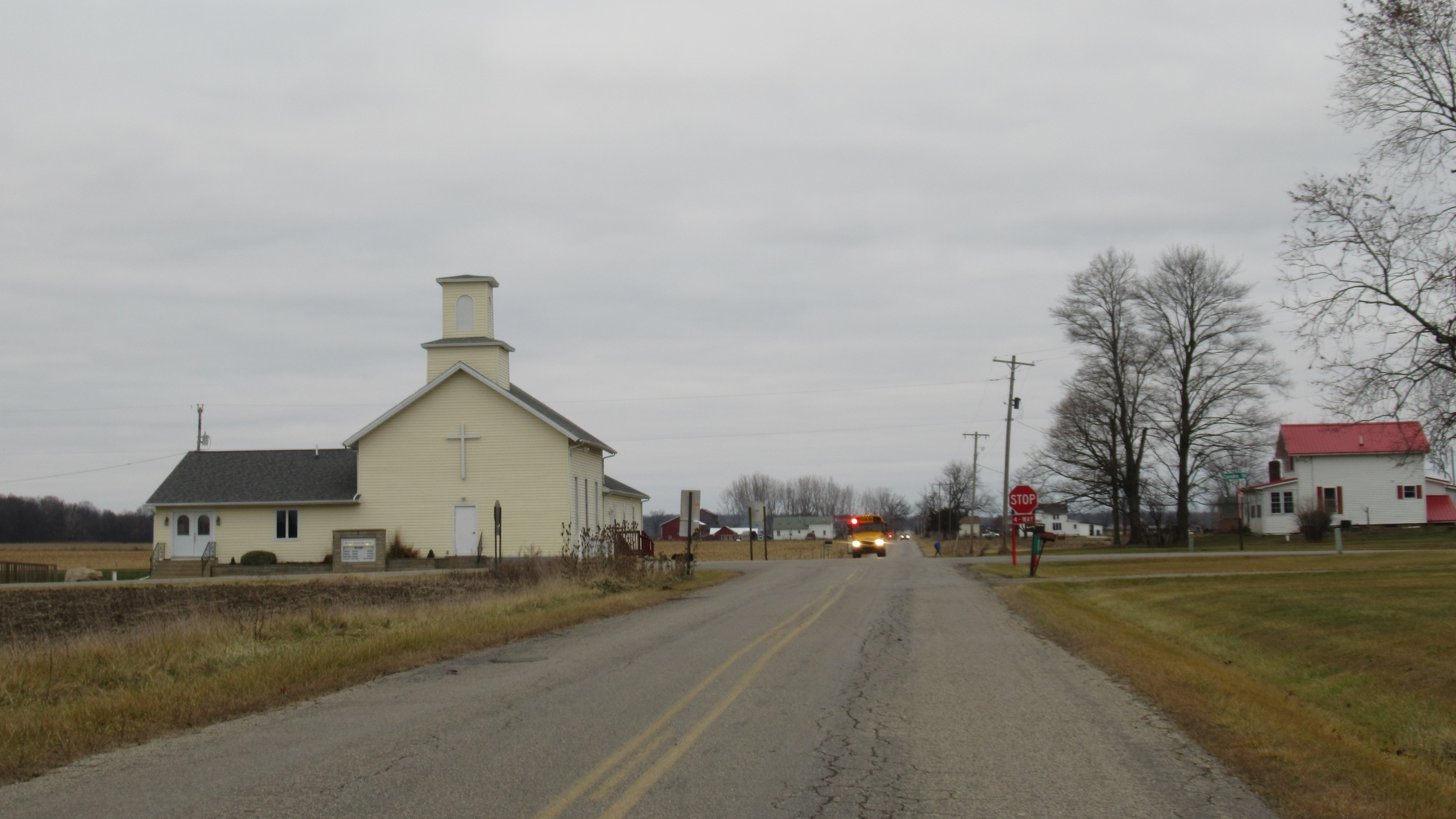
Unincorporated community of Betzer
