= Waldron, Michigan =

- Village
- Village of Waldron
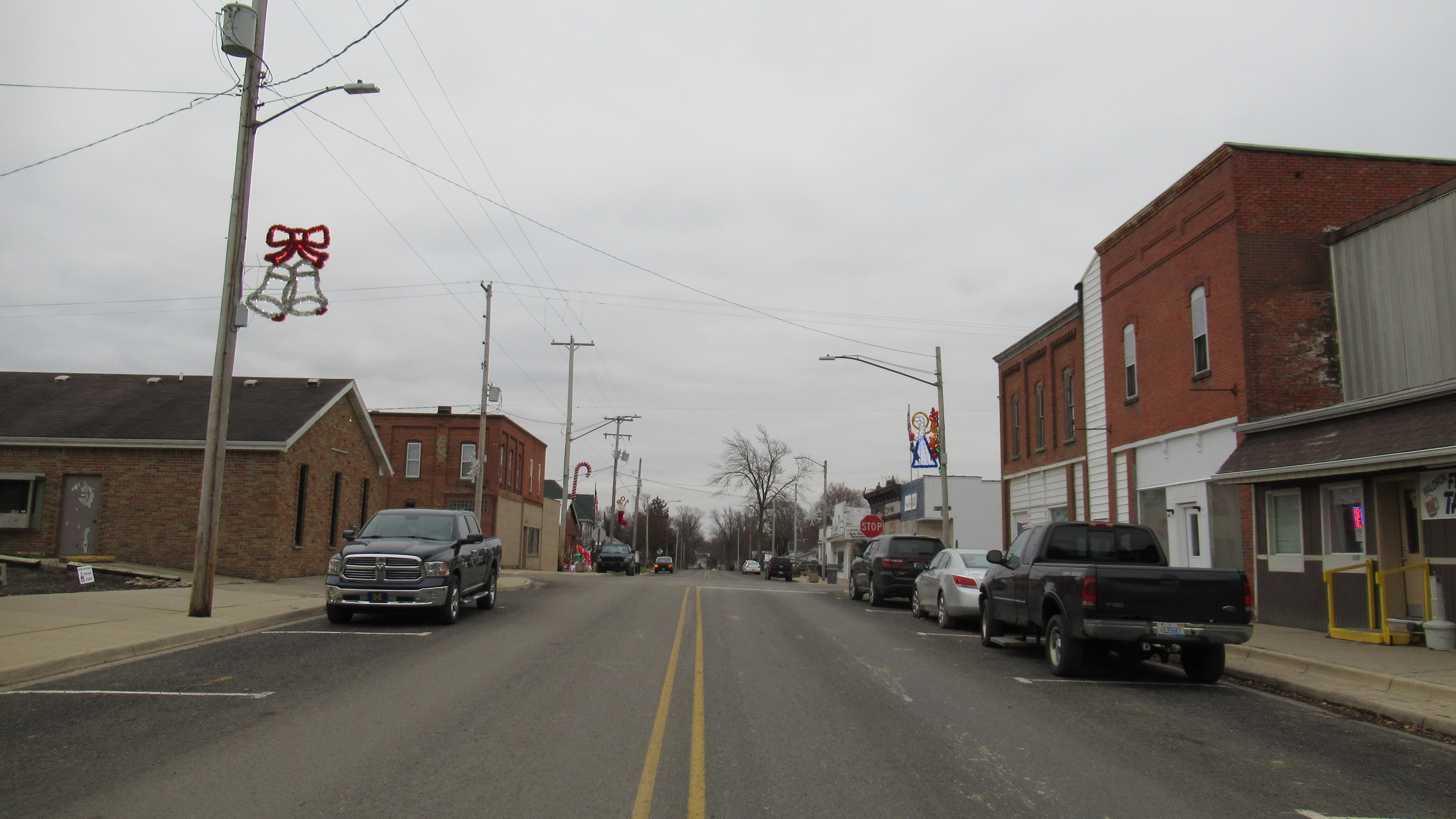
- Looking south along Main Street

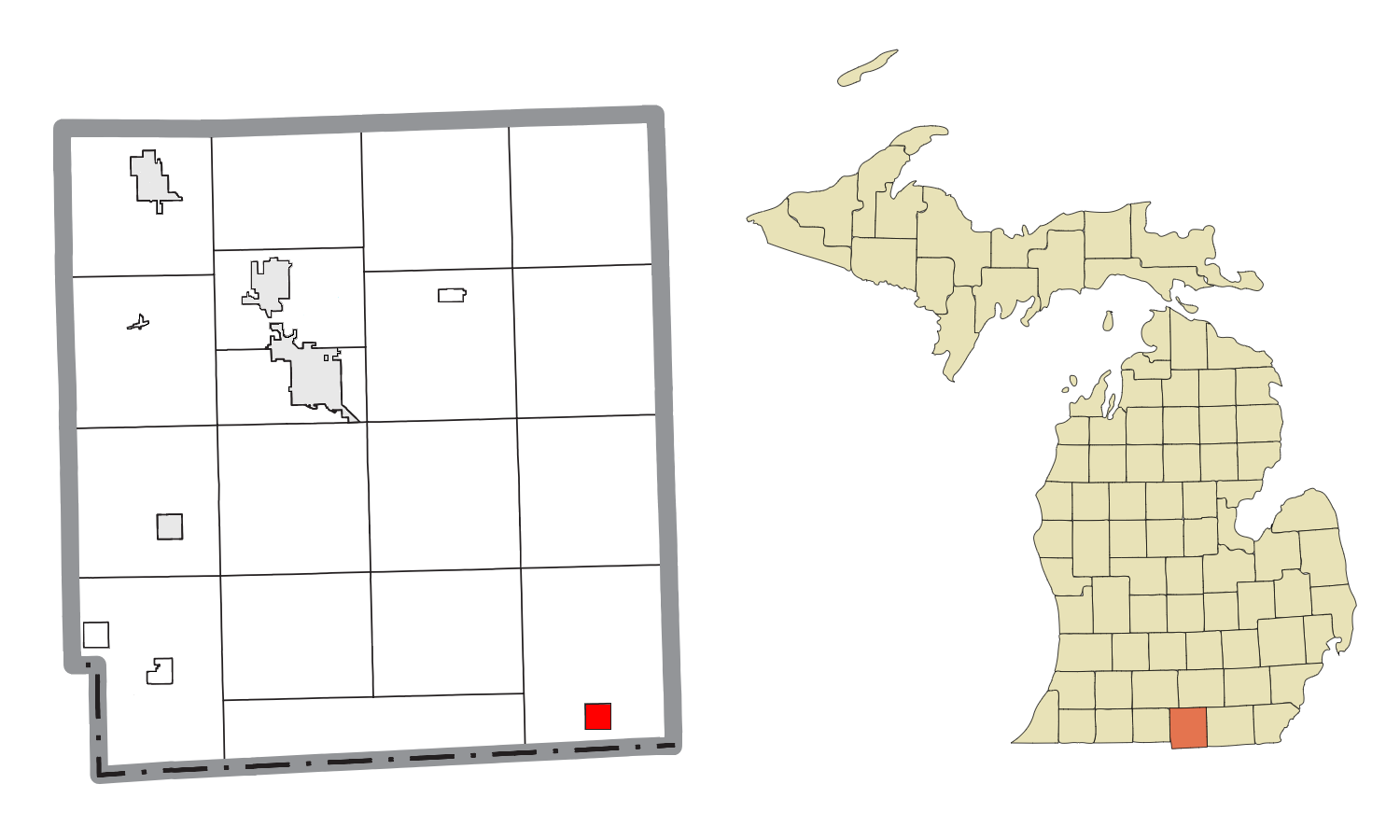
- Location within Hillsdale County

- Location within the state of Michigan Location within the United States
- Coordinates: 41°43′35″N 84°25′05″W
- Country: United States
- State: Michigan
- County: Hillsdale
- Township: Wright
- Settled: 1835
- Incorporated: 1905

Government
  - Type: Village council
  - President: Russ Platt
  - Clerk: Casey Gravelle

Area
  - Total: 1.00 sq mi (2.59 km^{2})
  - Land: 1.00 sq mi (2.59 km^{2})
  - Water: 0 sq mi (0.00 km^{2})
- Elevation: 899 ft (274 m)

Population (2020)
  - Total: 505
  - Density: 505.2/sq mi (195.04/km^{2})
- Time zone: UTC-5 (Eastern (EST))
  - Summer (DST): UTC-4 (EDT)
- ZIP code(s): 49288
- Area code: 517
- FIPS code: 26-82880
- GNIS feature ID: 1615686
- Website: https://villageofwaldron.com/

Waldron is a village in Hillsdale County in the U.S. state of Michigan. The population was 505 at the 2020 census. The village is located within Wright Township.

== History ==
The first settler to the area was Russell Coman, who came from New York in 1835. In 1837, the early settlers submitted the new name of the community as Coman, but a clerical error ended up assigning the community's name as Canaan. It was renamed Wright after the township in 1844. A post office opened on November 2, 1855, and was named South Wright due to the community's southern location in the township. In 1877, portions of the community were formally platted and adopted under the name Waldron after congressman Henry Waldron of Hillsdale, who represented the area in the U.S. House of Representatives. Waldron incorporated as a village in 1905.

== Geography ==
According to the U.S. Census Bureau, the village has a total area of 1.00 square mile (2.59 km^{2}), all land.

== Demographics ==
Historical population
Census	Pop.	Note	%±
1890	365		—
1910	435		—
1920	457		5.1%
1930	307		−32.8%
1940	424		38.1%
1950	427		0.7%
1960	454		6.3%
1970	564		24.2%
1980	570		1.1%
1990	581		1.9%
2000	590		1.5%
2010	538		−8.8%
2020	505		−6.1%
U.S. Decennial Census

=== 2010 census ===
As of the census of 2010, there were 538 people, 211 households, and 137 families living in the village. The population density was 538.0 inhabitants per square mile (207.7/km^{2}). There were 253 housing units at an average density of 253.0 per square mile (97.7/km^{2}). The racial makeup of the village was 97.6% White, 0.6% African American, 0.9% Native American, and 0.9% from two or more races. Hispanic or Latino of any race were 0.7% of the population.

There were 211 households, of which 40.3% had children under the age of 18 living with them, 44.1% were married couples living together, 14.2% had a female householder with no husband present, 6.6% had a male householder with no wife present, and 35.1% were non-families. 32.2% of all households were made up of individuals, and 10.9% had someone living alone who was 65 years of age or older. The average household size was 2.55 and the average family size was 3.18.

The median age in the village was 34.1 years. 30.1% of residents were under the age of 18; 7.8% were between the ages of 18 and 24; 26% were from 25 to 44; 24.2% were from 45 to 64; and 11.9% were 65 years of age or older. The gender makeup of the village was 47.4% male and 52.6% female.

=== 2000 census ===
As of the census of 2000, there were 590 people, 231 households, and 152 families living in the village. The population density was 575.6 inhabitants per square mile (222.2/km^{2}). There were 249 housing units at an average density of 242.9 per square mile (93.8/km^{2}). The racial makeup of the village was 97.80% White, 0.34% African American, 0.34% Native American, and 1.53% from two or more races. Hispanic or Latino of any race were 1.02% of the population.

There were 231 households, out of which 35.9% had children under the age of 18 living with them, 47.6% were married couples living together, 14.3% had a female householder with no husband present, and 33.8% were non-families. 29.0% of all households were made up of individuals, and 10.4% had someone living alone who was 65 years of age or older. The average household size was 2.54 and the average family size was 3.13.

In the village, the population was spread out, with 29.8% under the age of 18, 9.0% from 18 to 24, 30.0% from 25 to 44, 18.3% from 45 to 64, and 12.9% who were 65 years of age or older. The median age was 33 years. For every 100 females, there were 92.2 males. For every 100 females age 18 and over, there were 86.5 males.

The median income for a household in the village was $30,417, and the median income for a family was $36,125. Males had a median income of $28,958 versus $19,375 for females. The per capita income for the village was $15,083. About 10.3% of families and 16.4% of the population were below the poverty line, including 21.0% of those under age 18 and 5.9% of those age 65 or over.

== Education ==
The village is served entirely by the Waldron Area Schools, which has its main campus just north of the village boundaries.

== Notable people ==
- Don A. Jones, admiral and civil engineer, born in Waldron

== Images ==
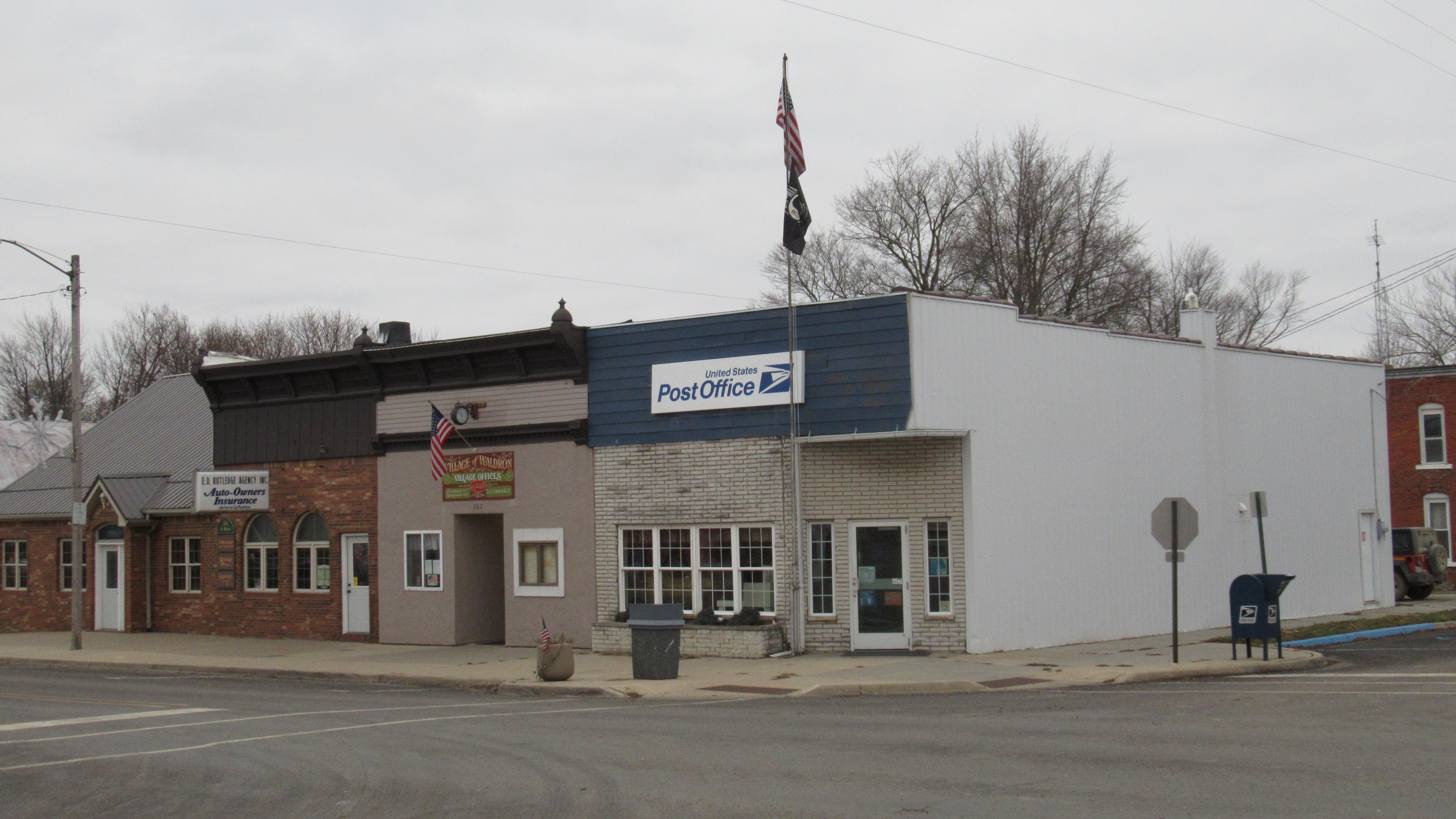
Village hall and post office

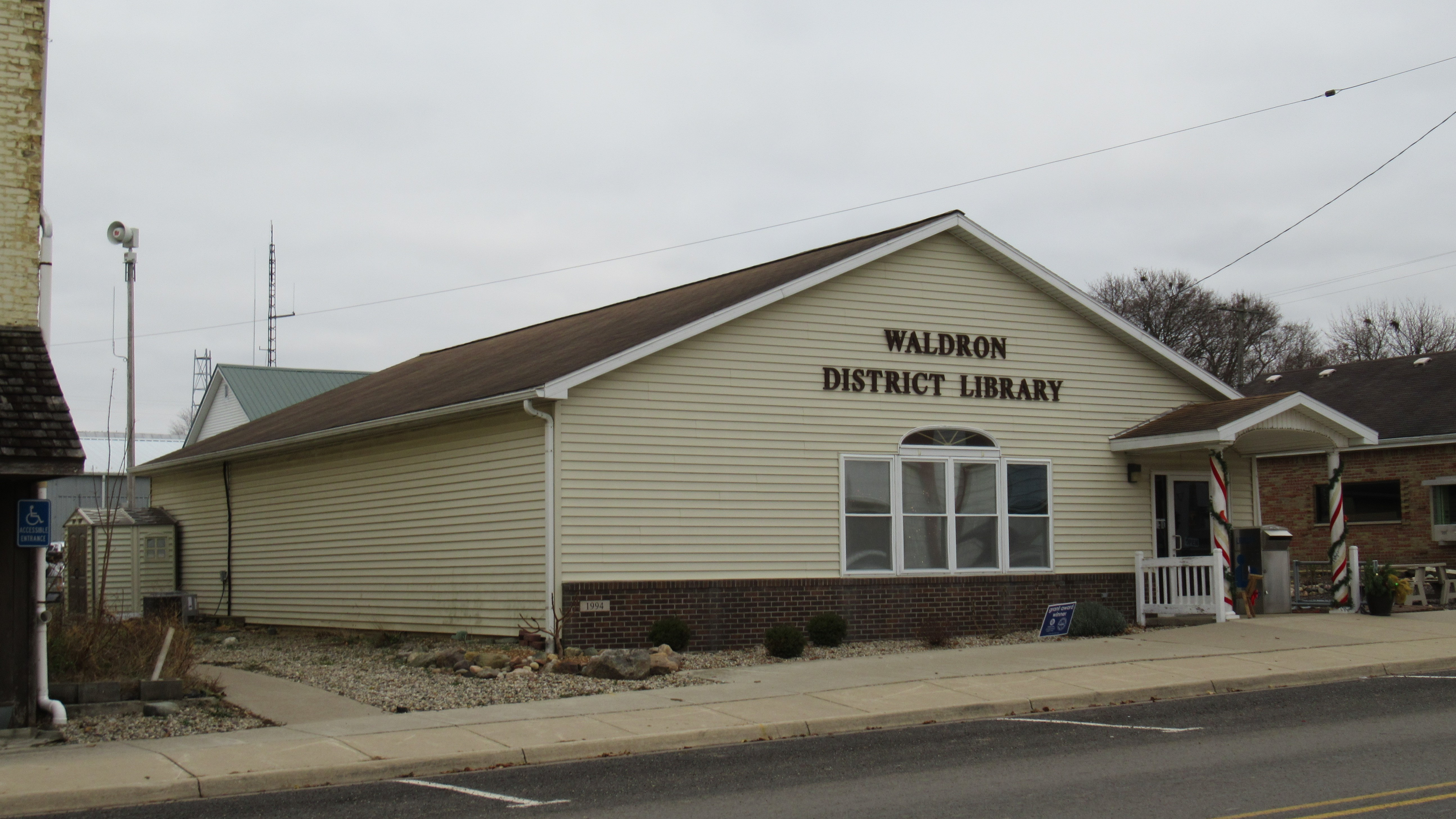
Waldron District Library

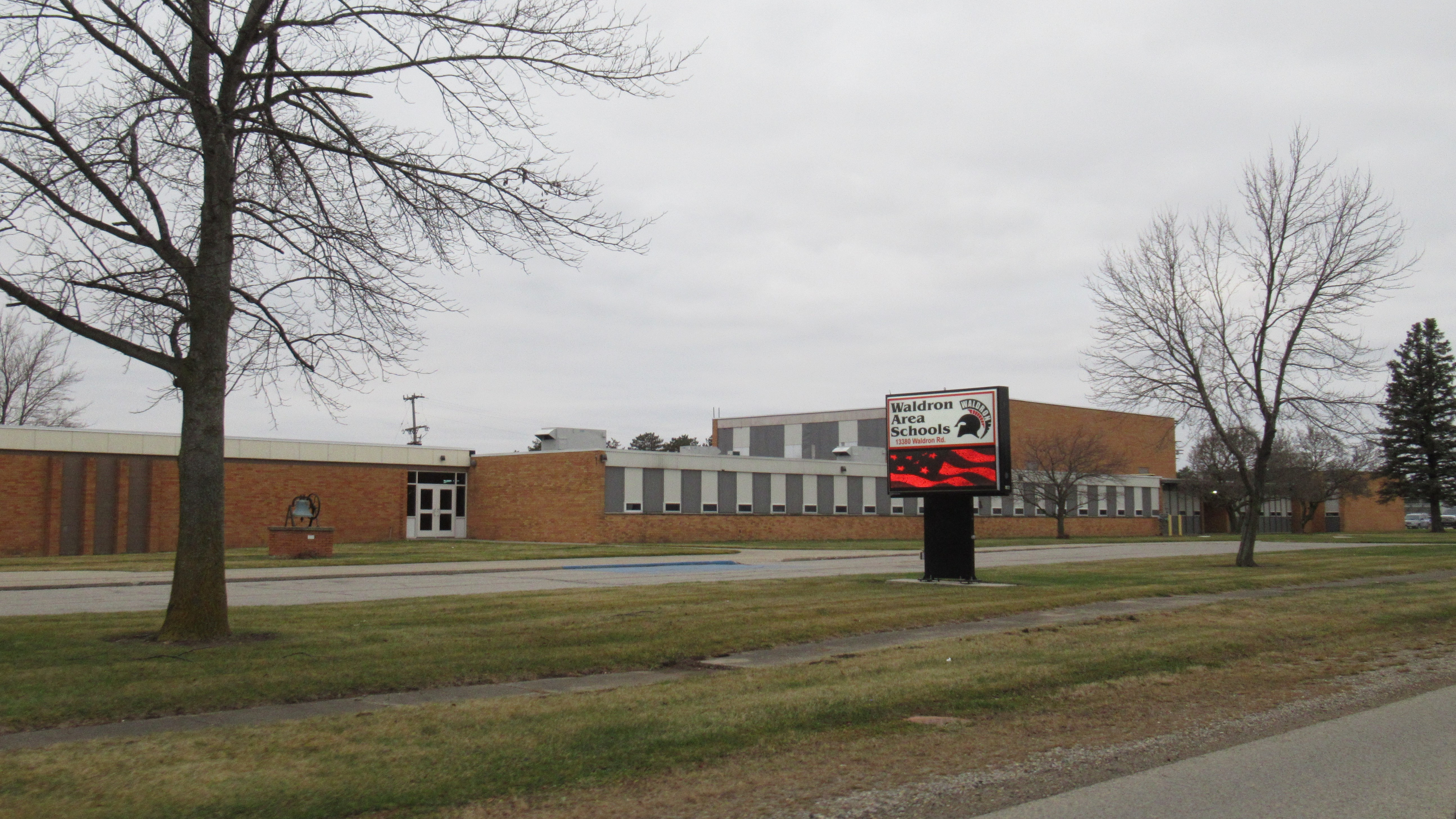
Waldron Area Schools
