= James C. Tison Jr. =

NOAA admiral

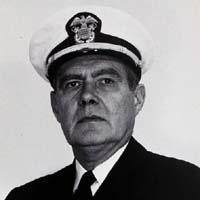
- Born: July 23, 1908; South Carolina
- Died: May 3, 1991 (aged 82); Charleston, South Carolina
- Burial place: Black Swamp Methodist Cemetery, Garnett, South Carolina
- Military career
- Allegiance: United States of America
- Branch: United States Coast and Geodetic Survey Corps (1929–1942); United States Army (1942–1947); United States Air Force (1947–1949); United States Coast and Geodetic Survey Corps (1950–1965); Environmental Science Services Administration Corps (1965–1968)
- Rank: Rear Admiral (Coast and Geodetic Survey); Colonel (U.S. Air Force))
- Commands: U.S. Coast and Geodetic Survey; Environmental Science Services Administration Corps
- Conflicts: World War II; Cold War
- Awards: Legion of Merit

Rear Admiral James C. Tison Jr. (July 23, 1908 – May 3, 1991) was an officer in the United States Coast and Geodetic Survey Corps and Environmental Science Services Administration Corps (ESSA Corps), both predecessors of the National Oceanic and Atmospheric Administration Commissioned Officer Corps (NOAA Corps). He served simultaneously as the first Director of the ESSA Corps, one of only two people to hold the position, and as the sixth Director of the United States Coast and Geodetic Survey.

During World War II, Tison was transferred to the United States Army Air Forces for wartime duty. He remained in the Army Air Forces postwar and also served in their successor, the United States Air Force, before returning to the Coast and Geodetic Survey Corps.

== Early life ==
James Chisolm Tison Jr., was born in South Carolina on July 23, 1908. He attended The Citadel, from which he graduated with a degree in civil engineering.

== Career ==
=== Early career ===
In 1929, Tison began his career in the United States Coast and Geodetic Survey, accepting a commission as an officer in the United States Coast and Geodetic Survey Corps. For the next several years, he served as a junior deck officer aboard survey ships of the Coast and Geodetic Survey fleet, seeing service in the Atlantic Ocean, Gulf of Mexico, Puget Sound, and Aleutian Islands, as well as ashore in Coast and Geodetic Survey field parties along the United States East Coast. For a few months in 1931, he was the assistant to the inspector of construction for the completion of the medium survey ship USC&GS Hydrographer (MSS 19) by Spear Engine Works in Norfolk, Virginia.

=== World War II ===
The United States entered World War II with the Japanese attack on Pearl Harbor on December 7, 1941, and in March 1942 Tison was transferred by executive order to the United States Army Air Forces for wartime service. Assigned to duty in South America, he spent the next year in charge of photogrammetric and geodetic control operations for aeronautical charting. He also saw service in the South Atlantic Ocean.

=== Later career ===
After the war ended in August 1945, Tison remained with the Army Air Forces, and he remained on duty with the United States Air Force after it became an independent service in September 1947. He left Air Force service in 1949 with the Air Force rank of colonel.

In 1950, Tison returned to duty as a Coast and Geodetic Survey Corps officer. He served as the Coast and Geodetic Survey liaison officer to the U.S. Air Force at Patrick Air Force Base, Florida, as geodetic officer at the Air Force Missile Test Center at Cape Canaveral, Florida, on triangulation duty in the Bahamas, and on sea duty off Alaska with the Coast and Geodetic Survey fleet.

In 1959, Tison graduated from the Industrial College of the Armed Forces in Washington, D.C. He then spent nearly two years as Assistant Director for Administration of the Coast and Geodetic Survey. In 1961, having achieved the rank of rear admiral, he became the Deputy Director of the Coast and Geodetic Survey.

=== Director ===
On July 13, 1965, a new United States Government scientific organization, the Environmental Science Services Administration (ESSA) was created. Under the reorganization that created ESSA, both the Coast and Geodetic Survey and the United States Weather Bureau, although retaining their independent identities, came under the control of ESSA, and the Coast and Geodetic Survey Corps was removed from the Coast and Geodetic Survey and subordinated directly to ESSA, becoming the Environmental Science Services Administration Corps (ESSA Corps). On the same day, the Director of the Coast and Geodetic Survey, Rear Admiral H. Arnold Karo, was promoted to vice admiral and became deputy administrator of the new ESSA. Simultaneously, Rear Admiral Tison became Acting Director of the Coast and Geodetic Survey and Acting Director of the new ESSA Corps. On September 1, 1965, Tison became the permanent Director of the Coast and Geodetic Survey, the sixth person to hold that position, and the first Director of the ESSA Corps, one of only two people ever to hold that position.

Tison served in both positions until September 1, 1968, when he retired from the Coast and Geodetic Survey and the ESSA Corps.

== Awards ==
Legion of Merit

Tison received the Legion of Merit for his Army Air Forces service during World War II. The citation for his award read:

While serving with the Office of the Assistant Chief of Air Staff-3, Headquarters, Army Air Forces, from March 1944 to October 1945, Colonel Tison prepared and supervised the execution of a successful plan to utilize the limited map making resources of the Army, Navy and Civil Branches. Colonel Tison's high degree of professional competence and exemplary devotion to duty reflect great credit upon himself and Army Air Forces.

== Personal life ==
Tison was married to the former Nan Keith Sinkler. They had two sons, John Huger Tison and James Sinkler Tison.

In retirement, Tison initially lived in Alexandria, Virginia. He later moved to Charleston, South Carolina.

== Death ==
Tison died of cancer on May 3, 1991, at a hospital in Charleston. He was buried at Black Swamp Methodist Church Cemetery in Garnett in Hampton County, South Carolina.

Military offices
Preceded by H. Arnold Karo	Director, United States Coast and Geodetic Survey; 1965–1968	Succeeded by Don A. Jones
Preceded by none	Director, Environmental Science Services Administration Corps; 1965–1968	Succeeded by Don A. Jones
