= Henry Arnold Karo =

United States Coast & Geodetic Survey Corps Admiral

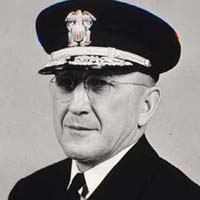
- H. Arnold Karo, photographed as a rear admiral.

5th Director, USC&GS
- In office 1955–1965
- President: Dwight D. Eisenhower
- Preceded by: Robert Francis Anthony Studds
- Succeeded by: James C. Tison, Jr.

Personal details
- Born: December 24, 1903 Lyons, Nebraska
- Died: May 23, 1986 (aged 82) Georgetown, Washington, D.C.

Military service
- Branch/service: United States Coast and Geodetic Survey Corps; United States Army (Air Forces); Environmental Science Services Administration (ESSA) Corps
- Years of service: 1923–1942 (Coast and Geodetic Survey Corps); 1942–1945 (Army); 1945–1965 (Coast and Geodetic Survey Corps); 1965–1967 (ESSA Corps)
- Rank: Vice Admiral (ESSA); Colonel (Army)
- Unit: Coast and Geodetic Survey Corps (1923–1942); Army Air Forces (1942–1945); Coast and Geodetic Survey Corps (1945–1965); Environmental Science Services Administration Corps (1965–1967)
- Battles/wars: World War II; Cold War

Henry Arnold Karo (December 24, 1903 – May 23, 1986) was a vice admiral in the former United States Coast and Geodetic Survey Corps, which is today known as the National Oceanic and Atmospheric Administration Commissioned Officer Corps. Vice Admiral Karo spent most of his working career in the United States Coast and Geodetic Survey, which provided coastal maps and charts for the United States. He rose through the organization's bureaucracy to become the director of the Survey.

Karo had been involved in the Survey since 1923, but the advent of World War II forced him to take on other duties. In this period, he rose to the rank of rear admiral. At war's end, he returned to the Coast and Geodetic Survey.

== World War II ==
Karo was transferred from the Coast and Geodeic Survey to the United States Army Air Forces in World War II, when he was commanding officer of the Air Force Aeronautical Chart Center in St. Louis, Missouri. Initially, he was given the Army rank of major, and was promoted to colonel during this period, but he returned to the Coast and Geodetic Survey as with the rank of rear admiral (see photo caption) at the end of the war.

== US Coast and Geodetic Survey ==
President Dwight Eisenhower named Rear Admiral Karo to succeed Rear Admiral Robert Francis Anthony Studds as Director of the Coast and Geodetic Survey in 1955. The recess appointment was subsequently made permanent by Senate confirmation.

From 1955 through 1965, Karo directed the Survey. In 1957, Karo oversaw an organization with a $10-million budget, 17 ships and 2,000 employees. In that same year, the Survey's publications list offered over 2,000 aerial and nautical maps and guides; and over 44 million of its documents were issued.

=== Establishing the US standard mile ===
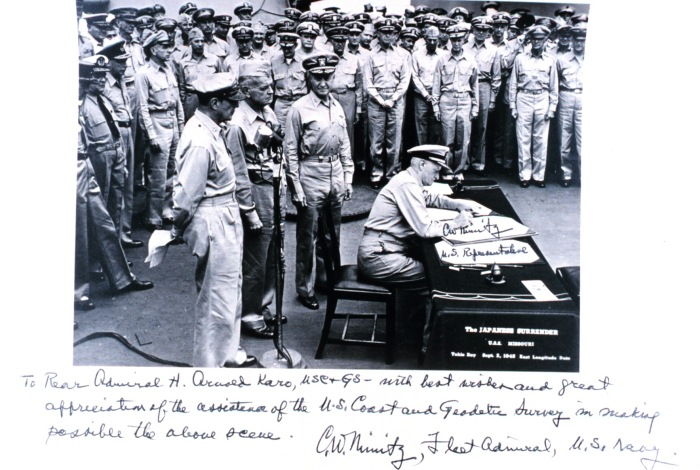
A handwritten inscription on photograph of Admiral Chester Nimitz signing the Japanese surrender document reads, "To Rear Admiral H. Arnold Karo, USC&GS -- with best wishes and great appreciation of the assistance of the U.S. Coast and Geodetic Survey in making possible the above scene." C.W. Nimitz, Fleet Admiral, U.S. Navy.

A mile is a unit of length, usually used to measure distance; however, the measurement varied amongst a number of national systems. There were (and remain today) some slight differences depending on whether a mile is construed in terms of Imperial units, United States customary units, or Norwegian/Swedish mil. In the 1950s, Karo headed the project which established the U.S. survey mile (also known as U.S. statute mile) of 5,280 survey feet which is slightly longer at approximately 1,609.347 219 meters (1 international mile is exactly 0.999 998 survey mile).

Karo was promoted to vice admiral just before he left the Coast and Geodetic Survey to help create a new government agency which would eventually merge the Survey with two other formerly independent agencies.

== Environmental Science Services Administration ==
From 1965, until his retirement in 1967, he was the deputy administrator of the National Oceanic and Atmospheric Administration's predecessor agency, the Environmental Science Services Administration.

== Later years ==
Karo died of respiratory failure at Georgetown University Hospital, in Washington, D.C. He was 82 years old.

== Commemoration ==
The Society of American Military Engineers Karo Award – a NOAA Association decoration presented annually as a group award to a field unit of the National Ocean Service for an outstanding contribution in an engineering or scientific field – is named for Karo.

== Notes ==
Military offices
Preceded by Robert Francis Anthony Studds	Director, United States Coast and Geodetic Survey; 1955–1965	Succeeded by James C. Tison, Jr.
