= USFS Eider =

Ship of the United States Bureau of Fisheries

USFS/US FWS Eider
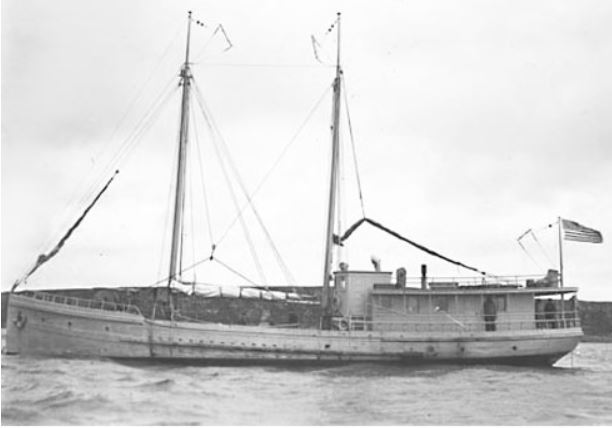
- USFS Eider in 1920.

History

United States
- Name: MV Idaho
- Namesake: Idaho
- Builder: Nilson and Kelez, Seattle, Washington
- Launched: 16 November 1913
- Identification: WTDD
- Fate: Sold to United States Bureau of Fisheries summer 1919

U.S. Bureau of Fisheries
- Name: US FWS Eider
- Namesake: Eider
- Cost: US$26,000
- Acquired: Summer 1919
- Commissioned: 1919
- Home port: Unalaska, Territory of Alaska
- Fate: Transferred to U.S. Fish and Wildlife Service 30 June 1940

U.S. Fish and Wildlife Service
- Name: US FWS Eider
- Namesake: Previous name retained
- Acquired: From U.S. Bureau of Fisheries 30 June 1940
- Fate: Transferred to United States Navy 1942
- Acquired: Transferred from U.S. Navy 1946
- Decommissioned: Late 1940s
- Fate: Sold to U.S. Geological Survey January 1949

United States Navy
- Name: USS YP-198
- Acquired: From Fish and Wildlife Service 1942
- Fate: Transferred to U.S. Coast Guard 29 May 1942
- Acquired: Transferred from U.S. Coast Guard 26 October 1945
- Stricken: 20 March 1946
- Fate: Transferred to Fish and Wildlife Service

United States Coast Guard
- Name: USCGC YP-198
- Namesake: Previous name retained
- Acquired: From U.S. Navy 29 May 1942
- Fate: Transferred to U.S. Navy 26 October 1945
- Notes: Operated as harbor fireboat

United States Geological Survey
- Name: MV Eider
- Namesake: Previous name retained
- Acquired: From Fish and Wildlife Service January 1949
- Out of service: October 1954
- Fate: Sold 1955

Trust Territory of the Pacific Islands
- Name: MV Eider
- Namesake: Previous name retained
- Acquired: 1955
- Home port: Marshall Islands
- Fate: Sank

General characteristics (as civilian vessel)
- Type: Motor schooner
- Tonnage: 76 gross register tons; 52 net tons
- Length: 88 ft (27 m)
- Beam: 19 ft (5.8 m)
- Draft: 9 ft 2 in (2.79 m)
- Propulsion: 1913: 110-horsepower (82 kW) 3-cylinder Frisco Standard gasoline engine; 1923: 140-horsepower (104 kW) 6-cylinder Atlas-Imperial diesel engine; Added 1925: 12-horsepower (8.9 kW) Cummins auxiliary diesel engine; 1951: 500-horsepower (373 kW) General Motors diesel engine
- Speed: 1913: 8 knots (15 km/h); 1923: 8.75 knots (16 km/h) (average)
- Range: 5,500 nautical miles (10,200 km)
- Crew: 1919: 13
- Armament: 1919: 1 x 1-pounder gun

General characteristics (as U.S. Navy/U.S. Coast Guard vessel)
- Type: Yard patrol boat; Harbor fireboat
- Displacement: 152 tons
- Length: 77 ft 3 in (23.55 m)
- Notes: SOURCE: Bruhn, p. 281.

USFS Eider was an American motor schooner in commission in the fleet of the United States Bureau of Fisheries from 1919 to 1940 and, as US FWS Eider, in the fleet of the U.S. Fish and Wildlife Service from 1940 to 1942 and again in the late 1940s. She ran a passenger-cargo service between Unalaska and the Pribilof Islands, and also carried passengers, supplies, and provisions to destinations on the mainland of the Territory of Alaska and in the Aleutian Islands. She occasionally supported research activities in Alaskan waters and the North Pacific Ocean, and she conducted patrols to protect Alaskan fisheries and marine mammals. In 1924, she provided logistical support to the first aerial circumnavigation of the world.

Prior to her acquisition by the Bureau of Fisheries, the ship was the commercial fishing vessel MV Idaho. From 1942 to 1945, the ship served in the United States Coast Guard as the harbor fireboat YP-198 during World War II. After the end of her Fish and Wildlife Service career, she served in the United States Geological Survey from 1949 to 1954, and from 1955 she operated in the Trust Territory of the Pacific Islands.

== Construction and commissioning ==
On 21 April 1910, the United States Congress assigned the responsibility for the management and harvest of northern fur seals, foxes, and other fur-bearing animals in the Pribilof Islands in the Bering Sea, as well as for the care, education, and welfare of the Aleut communities in the islands, to the United States Bureau of Fisheries (BOF). Since 1917, the BOF had operated a "Pribilof tender," a dedicated supply vessel used to transport passengers and cargo to and from the Pribilof Islands.

On 1 July 1918, the U.S. Congress appropriated US$20,000 to the BOF for the construction or purchase of a wooden-hulled motor vessel capable of operating in the rough waters of the Bering Sea to replace its existing Pribilof tender, the steamer USFS Roosevelt. The naval architecture firm of Lee and Brinton of Seattle, Washington, designed the ship, to be known as USFS Tern, following the BOF's custom of naming its vessels assigned to operate in the waters of the Territory of Alaska after seabirds common in the region. Tern was to be 70 feet (21 meters) long and have a heavy-duty 80-horsepower (60 kW) engine, a cruising range of over 2,000 nautical miles (3,700 kilometers; 2,300 miles), a cargo capacity of 30 tons, and sleeping accommodations for 16 people. The BOF advertised in Seattle for bids for the construction of Tern in 1918, but when the bidding period closed on 3 December 1918, the lowest bid was US$27,500, which was US$7,500 more than the Congressional appropriation. The BOF advertised for bids in Seattle again, but when the bidding closed the second time on 8 January 1919, the lowest bid, $26,000, still was too high.

The need to replace Roosevelt became more urgent on 17 January 1919, when the BOF assessed her as in need of major repairs, and the Steamboat Inspection Service later confirmed it; on 21 April 1919, an inspection at Bremerton, Washington, revealed extensive dry rot requiring an estimated US$186,000 in repairs, which the BOF deemed prohibitive. The BOF advertised in Seattle for bids for the construction of Tern for a third time, only to find that when bidding closed on 12 May 1919, the lowest bid, US$28,800, again exceeded the Congressional appropriation. Roosevelt was condemned on 4 June 1919. On 11 July 1919, the U.S. Congress passed a deficiency act that appropriated an additional US$7,500 for her replacement. The BOF scrapped plans to build Tern, and instead purchased the 88-foot (27-meter) motor schooner Idaho in the summer of 1919 for US$26,000.

Nilson and Kelez had constructed Idaho in Seattle and launched her on 16 November 1913. Employed as a commercial deep-water Pacific halibut fishing vessel, Idaho was well known in the area and regarded as seaworthy and capable of operating in the Bering Sea during voyages to the Pribilofs. The BOF renamed her USFS Eider and converted her for fisheries use by transferring most of Roosevelt′s movable equipment to her before selling Roosevelt on 15 July 1919 and adding additional cabin space and a communications room. The United States Navy installed a modern 0.5-kilowatt wireless system in her communications room and a 1-pounder gun on her deck so that could provide armed protection of fur seal rookeries.

== Service history ==
=== Bureau of Fisheries ===
Carrying several United States Government employees as passengers and a cargo of general supplies, United States Mail, and coal, and with a crew of 13 – her master, first officer, second officer, engineer, assistant engineer, radio operator, and mess attendant and six seamen – Eider departed Seattle on 26 October 1919 for her first voyage to the Pribilof Islands. The Pribilofs lacked mooring facilities for her or any harbors, and so the BOF stationed her at Unalaska on Unalaska Island in the Aleutian Islands – at 250 nautical miles (460 kilometers; 290 miles) away, the closest port to the Pribilofs. In addition to her voyages between Seattle, Unalaska, and the Pribilofs, Eider also transported passengers and supplies between the two main islands in the Pribilofs – Saint Paul Island and St. George Island – and to and between other communities on islands in the Aleutians and the Bering Sea.

Eider made one of her voyages to the Pribilofs in January 1920, an impressive feat in an era when few vessels attempted to operate in the Bering Sea during the hazardous winter months. In April 1920, she transported 1,312 sealskins and 938 fox skins from the Pribilofs to Unalaska, where they were loaded aboard the commercial steamer SS Victoria for transportation to Seattle. Outbreaks of smallpox forced health authorities to place her in quarantine at Unalaska on 18 October 1920 and again on 10 November 1920, but by then Eider had made 11 round trips between Unalaska and the Pribilof Islands and two voyages to King Cove on the southwestern tip of the Alaska Peninsula and had logged nearly 8,000 nautical miles (15,000 kilometers; 9,200 miles). On 28 November 1920, she left Unalaska to undergo repairs at Kodiak on Kodiak Island, and during her return voyage to Unalaska at the end of 1920 received word that the mail boat Pulitzer was missing near Chignik, Alaska; after searching for Pulitzer and finding her disabled and in distress, Eider took her crew, passengers, and mail aboard and transported them southwestward to Unga and Unalaska.

For several weeks in the autumn of 1921, Eider underwent a major overhaul at Kodiak in which her hull was sheathed with ironbark, her deck railings were modified, the floor of her forecastle was raised, her rudder was reriveted, her main engine was overhauled, a new bilge pump was installed, and her cabins, companionway, bulkheads, and heads received additions and modifications and new lockers were installed. In December 1922, Eider came to the assistance of the vessel Lister, which had run ashore at Cape Makushin on Unalaska Island, 40 miles (64 kilometres) from Unalaska.

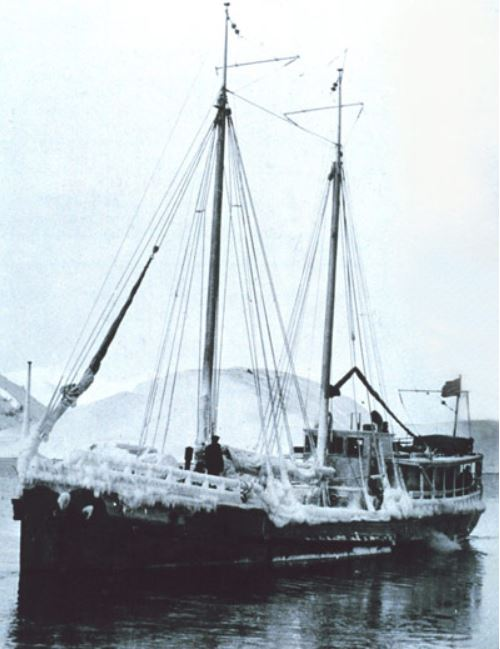
Eider arrives in port covered with ice.

On 24 March 1923, Eider arrived in Seattle to have her original gasoline engine replaced with a 140-horsepower (104 kW), 6-cylinder Atlas-Imperial solid-injection, reverse-gear diesel engine. Her new engine was more efficient and proved to be very reliable in the coming years, and with it Eider averaged 8.75 knots (16.2 km/h; 10.1 mph) during the summer of 1923, an improvement over the 8 knots (15 km/h; 9.2 mph) she could make with her old engine. Beginning in 1923, BOF employees embarked on Eider for several weeks each summer to inspect the salmon fisheries at various canneries and spawning streams; BOF employees who made these deployments aboard her included Dr. Charles H. Gilbert, Willis H. Rich, and Dennis Winn. Following a 1923 Executive Order, Eider began guarding the sea otters and migratory fur seal herds in the Territory of Alaska. During the winter of 1923–1924, she found and assisted the missing vessel Viking.

In 1924, Eider supported the first aerial circumnavigation of the world, achieved by United States Army Air Service aviators in four Douglas World Cruiser airplanes who took off from the naval air station at Sand Point in Seattle on 6 April 1924 and proceeded westward. The Soviet Union had prohibited the aircraft from landing on its soil, necessitating stops in the Territory of Alaska and Bering Sea area as the aircraft bypassed Soviet territory. Eider transported the advance personnel, supplies, gasoline, and lubricating oil needed to support the early stages of the trip to several locations in Alaska and the Bering Sea and provided the pilots with accommodations, meals, meteorological information, and moorings for the planes. Ultimately, two of the original airplanes completed the trip successfully by arriving at Seattle on 28 September 1924, 175 days after departing Naval Air Station Sand Point.

By the mid-1920s, Eider′s patrol duties had expanded to include the protection of salmon in Southwest Alaska. In 1925, a 12-horsepower (8.9 kW) Cummins auxiliary diesel engine was installed aboard her. That year, she suffered hull damage when she struck a rock in Wrangell Narrows between Mitkof Island and Kupreanof Island in the Alexander Archipelago in Southeast Alaska.

In 1929, Eider′s patrol duties grew again to include protection of the Pacific halibut in the northern Pacific Ocean. She aided with the annual seal census in July 1929. In September 1929, she lost her rudder and skeg (an extension of her keel from her stern) when she struck a rocky reef off St. George Island in the Pribilofs during a storm in fog, and she had to be towed to Juneau, Alaska, for repairs.

In performing her Pribilof tender duties and other assignments between 1920 and 1929, Eider logged as many as 17,000 nautical miles (31,000 kilometers; 20,000 miles) a year. Exposure to harsh weather and ice had taken a toll on her, and by the late 1920s she required overhauls and major repairs at an ever-increasing rate. In 1928, the BOF suggested the construction of new Pribilof tender, larger and more powerful than Eider, for voyages in the Bering Sea, This ship, USFS Penguin, entered service in May 1930. With Penguin in commission and assuming duties as the BOF′s Pribilof tender, the BOF reassigned Eider to annual fisheries patrol duty in the more protected waters around Kodiak, although she also continued to transport passengers and supplies to various settlements and BOF stations in the Territory of Alaska.

In the spring of 1934, Eider began patrol work to protect fur seal herds migrating northward along the coast of Washington near Neah Bay. Between February and April 1936, she took part in a Works Progress Administration stream improvement project in the Territory of Alaska′s Juneau and Wrangell districts. In 1938, biologists embarked on Eider conducted a tagging experiment to measure the travel times of fish.

=== Fish and Wildlife Service (1940–1942) ===
In 1939, the Bureau of Fisheries was transferred from the United States Department of Commerce to the United States Department of the Interior, and on 30 June 1940, it merged with the Interior Department's Division of Biological Survey to form the new Fish and Wildlife Service (FWS) as an element of the Interior Department. Via this reorganization, Eider became part of the fleet of the new FWS as US FWS Eider in 1940. She continued her operations in Alaskan waters.

On 24 October 1940, Eider struck a reef off Prince Rupert, British Columbia, Canada. Her hull sustained 14 feet (4.3 meters) of damage.

=== United States Navy and United States Coast Guard ===
The United States entered World War II on 7 December 1941, and in 1942 the U.S. Navy requisitioned Eider for war service, designated her as a yard patrol boat, and renamed her USS YP-198. As of 15 May 1942, YP-198 was assigned to the Thirteenth Naval District Inshore Patrol, based at the Northwestern Sector Section Base at Seattle. On 29 May 1942, the Navy transferred YP-198 to the United States Coast Guard, which converted her into a harbor fireboat.

After the conclusion of the war, the Coast Guard transferred YP-198 back to the Navy on 26 October 1945. The Navy, in turn, struck her from the Naval Register on 20 March 1946 and transferred her back to the Fish and Wildlife Service.

=== Fish and Wildlife Service (1946–1949) ===
Once again known as US FWS Eider, the vessel returned to service in the Fish and Wildlife Service fleet. In October 1946, she transported a search party to Shuyak Island n the northern part of the Kodiak Archipelago in an unsuccessful attempt to locate a missing U.S. Navy enlisted man. At some point later in the 1940s, the FWS declared Eider to be surplus property.

=== United States Geological Survey ===
In January 1949 a United States Geological Survey (USGS) geologist, G. D. Robinson, acquired Eider for use in studying volcanos and geology in and around the Aleutian Islands. Eider provided USGS geologists conducting this research with their first dedicated transportation to and from the Aleutians since 1946. In 1951, her engine was replaced with a 500-horsepower (373 kW) General Motors diesel engine. She supported USGS research in the Aleutians until October 1954, when the USGS declared her to be surplus property.

=== Trust Territory of the Pacific Islands ===
In 1955, the Trust Territory of the Pacific Islands acquired Eider for use in providing support for medical and dental personnel in the Marshall Islands. At some point during this service, she became disabled and sank while under tow for repairs.
