= USFS Crane =

American fishery patrol vessel built in 1928

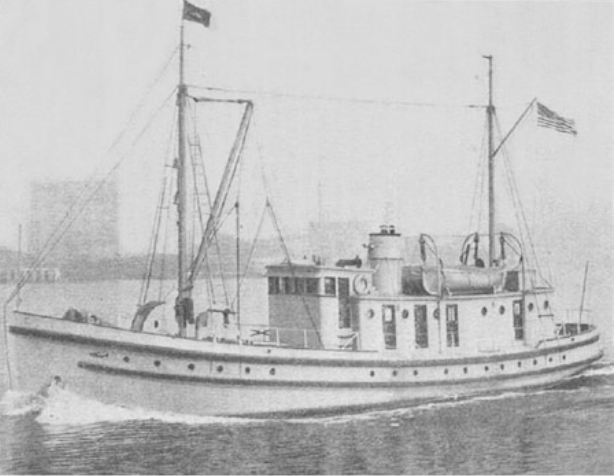
- USFS Crane in 1929

History

U.S. Bureau of Fisheries
- Name: USFS Crane
- Namesake: Crane, a long-necked, long-legged bird of the family Gruidae in the order Gruiformes
- Builder: J. C. Johnson Brothers, Port Blakely, Washington
- Cost: US$60,000
- Launched: 19 April 1928
- Completed: 1928
- Commissioned: April or May 1928
- Identification: WTDC
- Fate: Transferred to United States Fish and Wildlife Service 30 June 1940

U.S. Fish and Wildlife Service
- Name: US FWS Crane
- Acquired: 30 June 1940
- Fate: Transferred to Alaska Department of Fish and Game 11 April 1960

United States
- Name: Crane
- Namesake: Previous name retained
- Owner: Alaska Department of Fish and Game
- Acquired: 11 April 1960
- Fate: Sold November 1960

United States
- Name: Crane; Brapo; Fishing 5; Belle; Patricia; Crane (since 1978)
- Owner: Various private owners
- Cost: US$12,000 (November 1960); US$25,000 (1971); US$190,000 (1978); US$159,000 (November 2003)
- Identification: IMO number: 7051589; MMSI number: 367122990; Callsign: WDD3038
- Status: Extant 2019

General characteristics (as BOF fishery patrol vessel)
- Type: Fishery patrol vessel
- Tonnage: 134 GRT; 94 NRT
- Length: 92 ft (28.0 m)
- Beam: 20 ft (6.1 m)
- Draft: 11.7 ft (3.6 m)
- Installed power: 200 horsepower (150 kW)
- Propulsion: 1 x six-cylinder Washington direct-reversing Estep diesel engine
- Speed: 9.5 miles per hour (15.3 km/h)

USFS Crane was an American fishery patrol vessel that operated in the waters of the Territory of Alaska. She was in commission in the United States Bureau of Fisheries (BOF) fleet from 1928 to 1940. She then served as US FWS Crane in the fleet of the Fish and Wildlife Service from 1940 to 1960. After a brief stint in the fleet of the Alaska Department of Fish and Game during 1960, she was sold into private service, at various times named Crane, Brapo, Fishing 5, Belle, and Patricia during the 1960s and 1970s and then again Crane since 1978. She remained in service as of 2020.

== Bureau of Fisheries ==
=== Construction and characteristics ===
Coolidge & H. C. Hanson designed Crane and J. C. Johnson Brothers constructed her at Port Blakely, Washington. She was launched on 19 April 1928, quickly completed fitting-out, was commissioned into the U.S. Bureau of Fisheries (BOF) fleet as USFS Crane, and was ready for service by May 1928. She cost US$60,000 and R. L. Cole served as the BOF inspector responsible for managing her construction.

Crane was designed along the same lines as a fish-packing vessel and, at 92 feet (28.0 m) long and 134 gross register tons, was considered "massive" for her patrol role. She was of sturdy construction. She was framed entirely in Port Orford cedar, with 12-by-12-inch (30 by 30 cm) sawn frames on 18-inch (46 cm) centers spaced 6 inches (15 cm) apart. She had 8.5-by-9.5-inch (22 by 24 cm) deck beams, a 5-by-27-inch (13 by 69 cm) shelf timber, and a triple kelson made of 30 inches (76 cm) of solid wood. She had 3-inch (7.6 cm) fir planking and a 4-inch (10 cm) skin, and her hull was sheathed with ironbark. Washington Iron Works of Seattle, Washington, provided her 200-horsepower (150 kW) Washington direct-reversing Estep full diesel engine. Her electrical system included a 110-volt type B6H 112.5 ampere hour Edison nickel-iron-alkaline storage battery.

=== Operational history ===
Crane departed Seattle, Washington, in May 1928 to head north for her first season as a BOF patrol vessel in Alaskan waters. She established her annual pattern of operations, which involved conducting salmon fishery patrols off the Alaska Peninsula each summer, inspecting salmon-spawning waterways in Southeast Alaska each autumn, and spending each winter at Seattle to undergo repairs and overhaul. She also routinely operated as a transport vessel, for example regularly carrying seasonal employees and supplies between Seattle and the BOF station in the Naknek River region on Alaska's Bristol Bay coast.

Over the years, Crane also performed other duties. On 25 October 1928, she was among several BOF vessels tasked to assist in enforcing the provisions of the Northern Pacific Halibut Act of 1924, joining United States Navy ships and most of the rest of the BOF's Alaska Territory fleet in protecting populations of Pacific halibut in the Bering Sea and North Pacific Ocean, with her crew granted all powers of search and seizure in accordance with the act. She also added seasonal patrols of the waters of Washington and the Alaska Territory to her duties to protect sea otter populations and migrating herds of fur seals.

In July and August 1931, the BOF's "Pribilof tender," the cargo liner USFS Penguin, was pulled off her duty of supplying transportation to, from, and between the Pribilof Islands in the Bering Sea to transport the Commissioner of Fisheries and other officials on an inspection tour of Alaska fisheries. During these months, Crane substituted for Penguin on the passenger and freight runs to, from, and within the Pribilofs.

During the winter of 1933–1934, Crane and the BOF fishery patrol vessel USFS Scoter underwent a particularly significant restoration at Seattle thanks to a special allotment of funds by the Public Works Administration. After the completion of the renovations, Crane and Scoter deployed to Southeast Alaska to take part in a project funded by the Civil Works Administration in which they helped clear and improve salmon-spawning streams, and by 22 February 1934 the 200 temporary employees involved had cleared log jams and other obstructions from a combined total of 802 miles (1,291 km) of waterways in 325 streams. During a maritime strike on the United States West Coast that lasted from mid-November 1936 to 4 February 1937, Crane supported the United States Post Office Department by transporting the United States Mail from Seattle to Juneau, Territory of Alaska; on one voyage alone, she carried 750 sacks of mail. In 1938, Crane towed the BOF fishery patrol vessel USFS Brant from Ketchikan, Territory of Alaska, to Seattle for repairs after Brant suffered extensive damage when she ran aground on 15 July 1938. In the spring of 1939, Crane hauled cement and towed a barge carrying building materials from Washington to Southeast Alaska for a BOF Division of Scientific Inquiry construction project at Little Port Walter in Port Walter, Territory of Alaska.

While transiting the Inside Passage on 21 May 1939, Crane struck a rock in Grenville Channel on the coast of British Columbia, Canada. She suffered keel damage, and was drydocked for a few days at Ketchikan for repairs.

== Fish and Wildlife Service ==
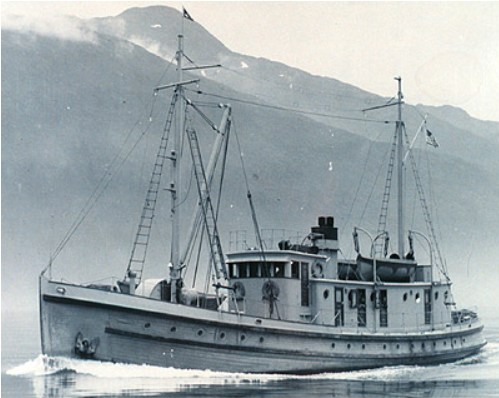
US FWS Crane entering Gastineau Channel in the Alexander Archipelago in Southeast Alaska sometime between 1940 and 1960.

In 1939, the BOF was transferred from the United States Department of Commerce to the United States Department of the Interior, and on 30 June 1940, it was merged with the Interior Department's Division of Biological Survey to form the new Fish and Wildlife Service (FWS), an element of the Interior Department. The vessel thus became part of the FWS fleet as US FWS Crane.

Little information is available about Crane's career in the Fish and Wildlife fleet, although as late as 1953 she occasionally substituted for the "Pribilof tender" – a responsibility the Fish and Wildlife Service assumed from the Bureau of Fisheries in 1940 – which by 1953 was the cargo liner US FWS Penguin II. During the late 1950s, the Fish and Wildlife Service, which had become the United States Fish and Wildlife Service as part of a major reorganization in 1956, based Crane at Seattle and used her for management purposes.

Alaska became a state on 3 January 1959, and, like other states, assumed the responsibility for fishery protection within its waters. The FWS accordingly began to transfer its Alaska fishery patrol vessels to the State of Alaska, and it transferred Crane to the Alaska Department of Fish and Game on 11 April 1960.

== Later career ==
Crane's tenure with the Alaska Department of Fish and Game was brief. In November 1960, the State of Alaska sold her to O. H. "Doc" Freeman of Seattle for US$12,000. One evening during Freeman's ownership, Crane's crew returned to her to find her sinking at her berth, down by the bow and with no waterline showing. After pumping her out, her crew found that a valve had been set improperly and corrected the problem.

In April 1961 Freeman sold Crane to the Pohley and Bratton families of California. The Pohleys and Brattons departed Seattle on 16 April 1961, attempting to take Crane southward to California themselves, but they encountered difficulties and a United States Coast Guard vessel had to tow Crane into Coos Bay, Oregon. The families then hired a crew to complete Crane's delivery voyage for them.

Crane's ownership changed several times over the next 10 years, and at various times she was named Brapo, Fishing 5, and Belle. W. Burns, a University of Washington professor, purchased her in 1971 for US$25,000. Over the next two years, Burns spent nearly $300,000 to restore her, retaining little of her original structure other than her hull. He rigged her to troll for tuna; later, he employed her for six years as a fish-packing vessel for a cannery at Friday Harbor, Washington.

By 1978, the vessel had been renamed Patricia. That year, "Snapper" Carson of Ketchikan, Alaska, purchased her for US$190,000. He renamed her Crane and used her until 2003 for salmon and herring fishing and packing. During Carson's ownership, Crane collided with an aluminum seiner under tow by another aluminum seiner that cut across her bow on a dark night while Crane was in the waters of British Columbia, heading north from Washington to Southeast Alaska; the sturdily built Crane almost sliced the seiner in half, but herself sustained no damage. On another occasion, when Carson placed Crane on a gridiron for the annual painting of her bottom, a large oil slick appeared to be spreading from her, but it turned out be creosote that Crane's great weight, a result of her strong construction, was squeezing from the gridiron's timbers.

In November 2003, Chris Beaudin bought Crane for US$159,000. She underwent a major restoration, and when it was complete Beaudin placed her in service with the company Crane Adventures, using her as a gillnet tender in Southeast Alaska during summers and making her available for charter for tours and other outings. She was still in service as of 2005.
