= USFS Scoter =

U.S. fishery patrol vessel

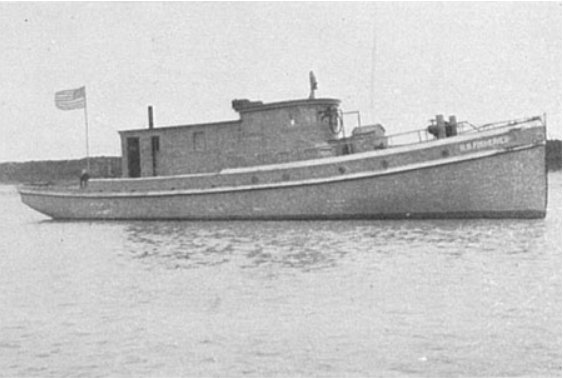
- USFS Scoter in 1925

United States
- Name: Clatsop
- Owner: Bristol Bay Packers
- Completed: 1920
- Identification: WTDF
- Fate: Sold to U.S. Bureau of Fisheries April 1922

U.S. Bureau of Fisheries
- Name: USFS Scoter
- Namesake: Scoter, a stocky seaduck in the genus Melanitta
- Cost: US$5,000
- Acquired: April 1922
- Commissioned: April or May 1922
- Fate: Transferred to Fish and Wildlife Service 30 June 1940

U.S. Fish and Wildlife Service
- Name: US FWS Scoter
- Namesake: Previous name retained
- Acquired: 30 June 1940
- Fate: Wrecked 19 September 1949; Salvaged; Sold 1950

United States
- Name: Clatsop
- Namesake: Earlier name restored
- Owner: Mr. and Mrs. Don Martin
- Acquired: 1950
- Notes: Extant May 1951

General characteristics (as BOF fishery patrol vessel)
- Type: Fishery patrol vessel
- Tonnage: 41 GRT; 28 NRT
- Length: 57 ft (17.4 m) to 65 ft (19.8 m) (sources vary)
- Beam: 15 ft (4.6 m)
- Draft: 6.8 ft (2.1 m)
- Propulsion: As built: 1 x 50 hp (37 kW) three-cylinder Standard gasoline engine; Winter 1929–1930 or winter 1930–1931 (see text): 1 x 66 hp (49 kW) Washington diesel engine
- Speed: 1920: 8 miles per hour (13 km/h)

USFS Scoter was an American fishery patrol vessel that operated in the waters of the Territory of Alaska. She was part of the United States Bureau of Fisheries (BOF) fleet from 1922 to 1940. She then served as US FWS Scoter in the fleet of the Fish and Wildlife Service from 1940 to 1950. Before her United States Government service, she was the commercial purse seiner Clatsop. She returned to that name and to private ownership after the conclusion of her U.S. Government career.

== U.S. Bureau of Fisheries ==
=== Construction and acquisition ===
The vessel was constructed at Astoria, Oregon, in 1920 as the purse seiner Clatsop for Bristol Bay Packers. The United States Bureau of Fisheries (BOF) purchased her at Portland, Oregon, in April 1922 and renamed her USFS Scoter. The steamer Akutan towed her from Portland to Bristol Bay on the coast of the Territory of Alaska, delivering her to the BOF there on 16 May 1922.

=== Operational history ===
Sixteen years after the United States Congress assigned the BOF the responsibility for enforcing fishery and marine mammal regulations in the Territory of Alaska with the Alien Fisheries Act of 1906, Scoter′s arrival gave the BOF its first real capability to enforce regulations efficiently in the Bristol Bay area. Using Scoter in conjunction with a number of shallow-draft BOF motor launches, BOF officials could coordinate the activities of various BOF boats to maximize the effect of fishery patrols and enforcement efforts throughout the BOF's Kvichak, Naknek, Nushagak, Igushik, and Ugashik districts.

In her early years, Scoter's annual operational pattern involved patrols in the Bristol Bay region each summer, often followed by autumn patrols in Southeast Alaska, with winters spent hauled out of the water at the BOF station at the Naknek River on the Bristol Bay coast. Her annual pattern of activities changed over time as her role in the BOF evolved. In 1928, Dr. Willis H. Rich, the BOF's chief investigator for salmon fisheries, and BOF agent Dennis Winn used Scoter to visit key fishing areas and facilities in Bristol Bay. On 25 October 1928, she was among several BOF vessels tasked to assist in enforcing the provisions of the Northern Pacific Halibut Act of 1924, joining United States Navy ships and most of the rest of the BOF's Alaska Territory fleet in protecting populations of Pacific halibut in the Bering Sea and North Pacific Ocean, with her crew and other embarked BOF personnel granted all powers of search and seizure in accordance with the act. At the end of the 1928 season, her winter routine changed; rather than heading to the Naknek River for winter haul-out, she transported fishery workers to Seattle, Washington, and spent the winter of 1928–1929 there, undergoing a complete overhaul that included the installation of a new pilothouse and the extension of her aft trunk. In the spring of 1929 she returned to Alaskan waters, transporting BOF employees to Alaska for the 1929 season. Thereafter she spent each winter at Seattle, undergoing renovation and repair, using her annual end-of-season voyage to Seattle and her yearly voyage northward in the spring to transport BOF employees and occasionally dignitaries from and to the Territory of Alaska.

While Scoter was at Seattle during either the winter of 1929–1930 or the winter of 1930–1931 (sources vary), her original 50-horsepower (37 kW) three-cylinder Standard gasoline engine was replaced by a new 66-horsepower (49 kW) Washington diesel engine, and her original engine then was installed aboard the BOF fishery patrol vessel USFS Blue Wing. During the winter of 1931–1932 Scoter again underwent a significant overhaul and renovation at Seattle.

In the 1930s, Scoter undertook patrols near Sitka in Southeast Alaska and Neah Bay on the northern coast of Washington to protect fur seal herds. Over the winter of 1933–1934, Scoter and the BOF fishery patrol vessel USFS Crane supported a Civil Works Administration-funded project to clear and improve salmon spawning streams in Southeast Alaska, and by 22 February 1934 the 200 temporary employees involved had cleared log jams and other obstructions from a combined total of 802 miles (1,291 km) of waterways in 325 streams. In 1935, Scoter joined the BOF fishery patrol vessel USFS Kittiwake in an experimental project to tag pink salmon and offer a 25-cent reward to the public for each tag returned to the BOF with information about the time and place the tagged fish had been caught; the two vessels combined to tag 1,900 fish, and the public returned over a third of the tags. In the late 1930s, Scoter conducted stream inspections and surveys around the Alaska Peninsula, near Craig in Southeast Alaska, around Prince of Wales Island in the Alexander Archipelago in Southeast Alaska, and around Kodiak on Kodiak Island in the Kodiak Archipelago.

== Fish and Wildlife Service ==
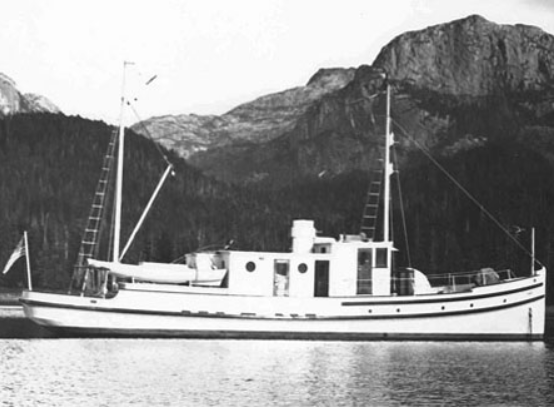
US FWS Scoter following a major renovation, sometime between 1940 and 1949.

In 1939, the BOF was transferred from the United States Department of Commerce to the United States Department of the Interior, and on 30 June 1940, it was merged with the Interior Department's Division of Biological Survey to form the new Fish and Wildlife Service (FWS), an element of the Interior Department that was destined to become the United States Fish and Wildlife Service in 1956. The vessel thus became part of the FWS fleet as US FWS Scoter.

In 1941, Scoter transported framing lumber from Seattle to Naknek, Territory of Alaska, for use in constructing the FWS's Brooks River field laboratory at Brooks Lake on the Alaska Peninsula. The Brooks River field laboratory operated until 1973, conducting salmon research and management.

On 19 September 1949, Scoter was wrecked on rocks in Slocum Arm (58°57′N 152°15′W) in Southeast Alaska. She apparently was salvaged, but the Juneau Empire reported in its 9 February 1951 edition that the FWS had "disposed of" Scoter in 1950.

== Later career ==
The Daily Sitka Sentinel reported in its 10 May 1951 edition that the vessel had been renamed Clatsop and was the property of Mr. and Mrs. Don Martin and that Don Martin had had self-steering gear, a radio direction finder, a radio telephone, and a bug shoe installed aboard her. It also reported that Martin planned to depart Sitka on 11 May 1951 for a tuna-fishing trip aboard Clatsop, planning to start off Guadalupe, Baja California, Mexico, and then work his way north along the coast of California as far as Monterey.
