= USFS Penguin =

U.S. fisheries vessel

USFS/US FWS Penguin
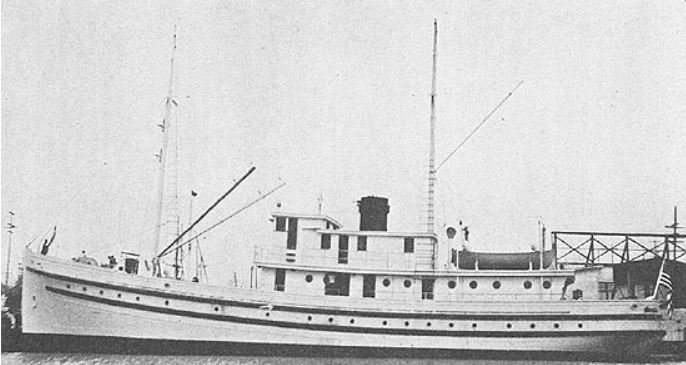
- USFS Penguin in 1931

U.S. Bureau of Fisheries
- Name: USFS Penguin
- Namesake: Penguin
- Builder: Ballard Marine Railway Company, Seattle, Washington
- Launched: 8 January 1930
- Completed: 1930
- Commissioned: Spring 1930
- Home port: Seattle, Washington
- Identification: WTDH
- Fate: Transferred to U.S. Fish and Wildlife Service 30 June 1940

U.S. Fish and Wildlife Service
- Name: US FWS Penguin
- Namesake: Previous name retained
- Acquired: From U.S. Bureau of Fisheries 30 June 1940
- Decommissioned: 1950
- Home port: Seattle, Washington
- Fate: Damaged by fire 3 June 1950; Sold 21 March 1951

United Kingdom
- Name: MV Carib Queen
- Owner: H. O. Merren
- Acquired: 1957
- Home port: Georgetown, Cayman Islands
- Status: Extant 1957 as commercial passenger ship

General characteristics (as Bureau of Fisheries/Fish and Wildlife Service cargo liner)
- Type: Cargo liner
- Tonnage: 394 GRT
- Length: 130 ft (40 m)
- Beam: 27 ft (8.2 m)
- Draft: 17 ft 10 in (5.44 m)
- Propulsion: Two 400 horsepower (300 kW) 6-cylinder, direct-reversible Union full diesel engines, two shafts
- Speed: 10 knots (19 km/h; 12 mph)
- Range: 4,000 nmi (7,400 km; 4,600 mi)
- Capacity: 160 tons of cargo
- Sensors & processing systems: Fathometer (installed 1936)

USFS Penguin was an American cargo liner in commission in the fleet of the United States Bureau of Fisheries from 1930 to 1940 and, as US FWS Penguin, in the fleet of the U.S. Fish and Wildlife Service from 1940 to 1950. She ran a passenger-cargo service between Seattle, Washington, and the Pribilof Islands, and provided transportation between the two inhabited Pribilofs, Saint Paul Island and St. George Island. She also carried passengers, supplies, and provisions to destinations on the mainland of the Territory of Alaska and in the Aleutian Islands. She occasionally supported research activities in Alaskan waters and the North Pacific Ocean.

== Construction and commissioning ==
On 21 April 1910, the United States Congress assigned the responsibility for the management and harvest of northern fur seals, foxes and other fur-bearing animals in the Pribilof Islands in the Bering Sea, as well as for the care, education, and welfare of the Aleut communities in the islands to the United States Bureau of Fisheries (BOF). The United States Department of the Interior′s Fish and Wildlife Service – renamed the United States Fish and Wildlife Service (USFWS) after a 1956 reorganization – assumed these responsibilities when it replaced the Bureau of Fisheries in 1940. Since 1917, the Bureau of Fisheries had operated a "Pribilof tender", a dedicated supply vessel used to transport passengers and cargo to and from the Pribilof Islands.

In 1928, the BOF recommended the replacement of its existing Pribilof tender, the aging MV Eider, with a new, larger, and more powerful vessel. The U.S. Congress appropriated US$125,000 for the construction of the new ship, which would be the largest BOF vessel to serve in the waters of the Territory of Alaska up to that time. The Seattle, Washington, naval architect Harold Cornelius Hanson – who became quite fond of the ship and referred to her as the "best wooden boat ever built" – designed the vessel as a wooden-hulled coastal cargo liner, with a sheathed ironbark hull that would allow her to operate in rough seas and drifting ice, twin screws driven by twin diesel engines, comfortable passenger quarters below deck, a 160-ton cargo capacity, and a cruising range of 4,000 nautical miles (7,400 km; 4,600 mi). With the low bid of $89,589, the Ballard Marine Railroad Company of Seattle won the contract to construct her.

The first attempt to launch the ship at Salmon Bay in Seattle on 7 January 1930 failed when, after she was christened with the traditional bottle of champagne broken across her bow, she did not move; the grease used on the launching skids had frozen and the ship remained stuck in place even after two boats in the bay attempted to pull her into the water. By 8 January 1930, the grease had thawed and, with a large and enthusiastic crowd looking on, the launching ceremony was repeated and the ship slid into Salmon Bay. After fitting out, the ship was commissioned into the BOF fleet in the spring of 1930 as USFS Penguin.

== Service history ==
=== Bureau of Fisheries ===
Immediately following her commissioning, Penguin departed Seattle on 5 May 1930 to begin her first voyage to the Pribilof Islands, where she arrived on 16 May 1930, delivering 17 BOF employees and 175 tons of general cargo. In September 1930, she spent two weeks supporting salmon escapement studies in Southeast Alaska's Ketchikan District. By the end of 1930, after only eight months in commission, Penguin had logged over 20,600 nautical miles (38,200 km; 23,700 mi) and had proven her capability to operate in extreme weather conditions that arrived late in the year.

Commissioner of Fisheries Henry O'Malley – the chief of the BOF – and his party used Penguin for several weeks in July and August 1931 to inspect fisheries in various parts of the Territory of Alaska, and the BOF fishery patrol vessel USFS Crane substituted for Penguin as the BOF′s Pribilof tender during that period. In September 1932, Penguin transported three live fur seals and 19 live rosy finches from the Pribilof Islands to Seattle, from which the animals were shipped by train to the National Zoological Park in Washington D.C.; all but one male fur seal and three of the finches survived the trip.

On 24 January 1933, the 59-foot (18 m) wooden Unangan Aleut trading boat Umnak Native was anchored in Inanudak Bay off Umnak in the Aleutian Islands when a violent storm struck, snapping her anchor chain, and she broke up and sank when her engine failed to start. Only four of the 15 people on board survived, including Bishop Antonin Pokrovsky of the Russian Orthodox Church. Local inhabitants on Umnak found Pokrovsky after he reached shore, but could not transport him, and the steamer Starr, although in the vicinity, lacked the charts necessary to enter the bay safely and pick him up. Pokrovsky was suffering from severe illness and frozen legs, so the BOF was asked to help, and it sent Penguin, which rescued Pokrovsky on 14 February 1933.

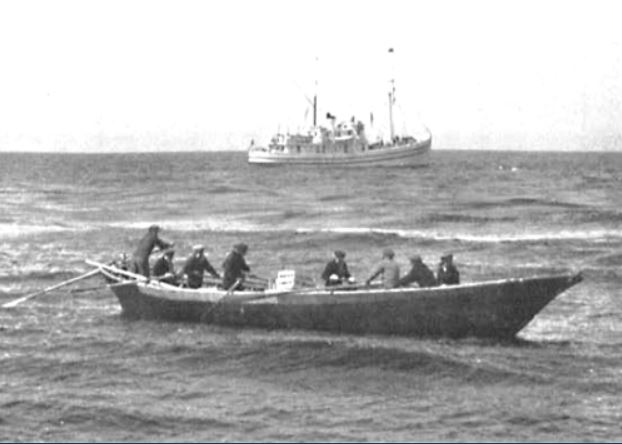
USFS Penguin rides at anchor in the Bering Sea off St. George Island in the Pribilof Islands in 1939 as a baidar, or "bidarrah", transships her cargo to the island. The lack of docking facilities for Penguin in the Pribilofs necessitated this time-consuming method of unloading her.

Penguin suffered two mishaps of her own later in 1933. On 8 August 1933, her steering gear broke while she was in Seymour Narrows in British Columbia's Discovery Passage; strong tidal currents in the narrows endangered her, but the halibut fishing boat Bernice was nearby and towed her to safety so she could make repairs. On 21 September, Penguin collided with the vessel Tuscan about 12 nautical miles (22 km; 14 mi) southeast of Ketchikan, then towed the damaged Tuscan to Ketchikan; Tuscan's owners later filed a claim for US$6,800 claim in damages against the BOF, but a trial six months later resulted in dismissal of the claim when Tuscan's owners could not prove negligence on the part of Penguin.

In 1934, Penguin transported United States Navy, United States Post Office, and Steamboat Inspection Service personnel to various destinations along the coast of the Territory of Alaska. In 1936, a fathometer was installed aboard Penguin which allowed her to navigate more safely in Alaskan waters and especially in the poorly charted waters of the Aleutian Islands. After the BOF established a field station on Amchitka in the western Aleutians in 1937 to expand the study and protection of sea otters, Penguin began making voyages to Amchitka to transport construction materials, construction workers, supplies, and cargo for the construction and maintenance of the station.

A case of measles was discovered aboard Penguin while she was at Saint Paul Island in the Pribilofs on 1 July 1939, and she underwent a two-week quarantine. In 1940, Penguin's crew assisted the staff at the Amchitka field station with electrical repairs, power plant servicing, and the installation of a radio-telephone transmitter and antennae.

In addition to these activities, Penguin continued her regular schedule of voyages between Seattle and the Pribilof Islands, bringing passengers and provisions to the islands and transporting them between the two inhabited Pribilofs, Saint Paul Island and St. George Island. During the 1930s, the annual take of sealskins at the Pribilofs increased significantly, and by 1940 reached an annual total of 64,864, the most taken in 50 years. Fox pelts also were an important export from the Pribilofs; in the December 1938–January 1939 trapping season alone, 1,029 fox pelts were also taken on the islands. Byproducts from sealing operations produced at a plant on Saint Paul Island – consisting in 1939 of nearly 28,000 US gallons (514 barrels; 105,592 liters) of seal blubber oil, 4,789 gallons of seal carcass oil; and 338,421 pounds of seal meal – also were exported. Penguin and military vessels transported all these goods to Seattle. From there, the skins went by rail to St. Louis, Missouri, for processing and public auction by the Fouke Fur Company, while the BOF′s Division of Fish Culture acquired 75 tons of the seal meal for use as hatchery fish food across the United States and the rest of the seal meal was sold at auction.

=== Fish and Wildlife Service ===
In 1939, the Bureau of Fisheries was transferred from the United States Department of Commerce to the United States Department of the Interior, and on 30 June 1940, it merged with the Interior Department's Division of Biological Survey to form the new Fish and Wildlife Service (FWS) as an element of the Interior Department. Via this reorganization, Penguin became part of the fleet of the new FWS in 1940.

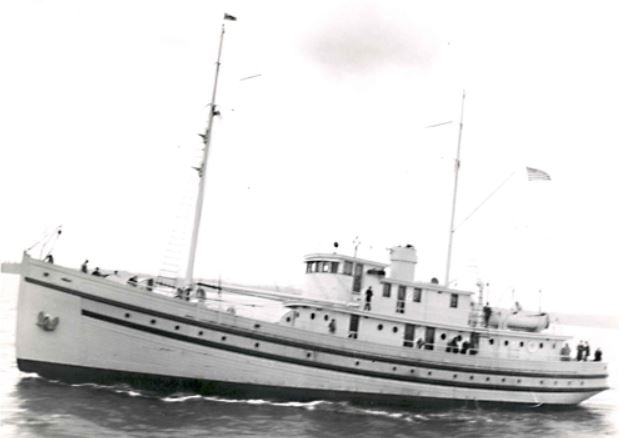
Penguin in an undated photograph.

As the threat of war with Japan grew, Penguin was transferred from the FWS to the U.S. Navy in 1941 for special duty, and she arrived at Dutch Harbor on Amaknak Island in the Aleutian Islands in early 1942 to resume her voyages to the Pribilofs. During 1942, she transported supplies, provisions, and equipment to an internment camp at Funter Bay, Alaska, in preparation for the evacuation of the Aleut population from the Pribilof Islands to the camp.

Between 1947 and 1949, Penguin conducted cruises involving the study of albatrosses that took her as far as the western tip of the Aleutian Island chain, across the North Pacific Ocean, and as far south as San Francisco, California. By 1948, she was logging an average of almost 29,000 nautical miles (54,000 km; 33,000 mi) per year.

On the night of 3 June 1950, Penguin was moored at the FWS dock in Lake Union at Seattle when a fire destroyed her superstructure and cabins. Her hull was saved, but the FWS concluded that the cost of repairs – originally estimated at between US$15,000 and US$20,000, but later at US$75,000 – was higher than the cost of purchasing a replacement vessel. With Penguin at the time of the fire scheduled to depart for the Pribilofs with much-needed supplies on 13 June 1950, her replacement was a matter of some urgency, so the FWS retired her from service and on 9 June 1950 purchased the United States Army coastal cargo ship Lt. Raymond Zussman and placed her in service as its new Pribilof tender immediately. Lt. Raymond Zussman departed Seattle for her first voyage to the Pribilofs on 17 June 1950, only four days later than Penguin's scheduled departure. During the summer of 1950, United States Secretary of the Interior Oscar L. Chapman announced that Lt. Raymond Zussman would undergo a name change, saying, "The goodwill built up for 20 years in the name of the Penguin will not be lost...the vessel's successor has been named Penguin II." Accordingly, the FWS formally renamed its new Pribilof tender MV Penguin II in honor of Penguin on 21 September 1950.

=== Later career ===
The FWS sold the damaged Penguin at auction to Tom Farrell and Russ Gibson of Seattle for US$25,778 on 21 March 1951. Believing she could be repaired and returned to service, her designer, H. C. Hanson, obtained her and completely rebuilt her, also installing new wiring and equipment during her reconstruction.

The H. O. Merren Company of the Cayman Islands bought Penguin in 1957, registered her under the British flag, renamed her Carib Queen, and based her at Georgetown in the Cayman Islands. H. O. Merren used her to transport tourists from Florida to H. O. Merren's resort in the Caymans.
