= United States Fish Commission =

Former U.S. government fisheries agency

United States Commission of Fish and Fisheries
- Commission of Fish and Fisheries (1871–1903); Bureau of Fisheries (1903–1940)
- Flag of the United States Bureau of Fisheries

Agency overview
- Formed: February 9, 1871; 155 years ago
- Dissolved: June 30, 1940; 86 years ago
- Superseding agency: United States Fish and Wildlife Service
- Jurisdiction: United States federal government
- Parent agency: U.S. Department of Commerce and Labor (1903–1913); U.S. Department of Commerce (1913–1939); U.S. Department of the Interior (1939–1940)

The United States Fish Commission, formally known as the United States Commission of Fish and Fisheries, was an agency of the United States government created in 1871 to investigate, promote, and preserve the fisheries of the United States. In 1903, it was reorganized as the United States Bureau of Fisheries, sometimes referred to as the United States Fisheries Service, which operated until 1940. In 1940, the Bureau of Fisheries was abolished when its personnel and facilities became part of the newly created Fish and Wildlife Service, under the United States Department of the Interior.

== Organizational history ==
=== U.S. Fish Commission (1871–1903) ===
By the 1860s, increasing human pressure on the fish and game resources of the United States had become apparent to the United States government, and fisheries became the first aspect of the problem to receive U.S. government attention when Robert Barnwell Roosevelt, a Democratic congressmen from New York's 4th Congressional District, originated a bill in the United States House of Representatives to create the U.S. Fish Commission. It was established by a joint resolution (16 Stat. 593) of the United States Congress on February 9, 1871, as an independent agency of the U.S. government with a mandate to investigate the causes for the decrease of commercial fish and other aquatic animals in the coastal and inland waters of the United States, to recommend remedies to the U.S. Congress and the states, and to oversee restoration efforts. With a budget of US$5,000, it began operations in 1871, organized to engage in scientific, statistical, and economic investigations of U.S. fisheries to study the "decrease of the food fishes of the seacoasts and to suggest remedial measures."

An expansion of the Fish Commission's mission followed quickly, when insistence by the American Fish Culturalist Association spurred the Congress in 1872 to add fish culture to the Fish Commission's responsibilities, with an appropriation of US$15,000 to establish fish hatcheries for the propagation of food fishes along the seacoasts and in the lakes of the United States. Following this change, the commission was organized into three divisions: the Division of Inquiry respecting Food-Fishes and Fishing Grounds, the Division of Fisheries, and the Division of Fish-Culture. The commission was led first by Spencer F. Baird, then George Brown Goode, Marshall McDonald, John J. Brice, and finally George M. Bowers.

=== U.S. Bureau of Fisheries (1903–1940) ===
By an Act of Congress of February 14, 1903, the U.S. Fish Commission became part of the newly created United States Department of Commerce and Labor and was reorganized as the United States Bureau of Fisheries, with both the transfer and the name change effective on July 1, 1903. In 1913, the Department of Commerce and Labor was divided into the United States Department of Commerce and the United States Department of Labor, and the Bureau of Fisheries became part of the new Department of Commerce. Bowers led the Bureau of Fisheries, followed by Hugh McCormick Smith, Henry O'Malley, and finally Frank T. Bell.

In 1939, the Bureau of Fisheries was transferred to the United States Department of the Interior, and on June 30, 1940, it merged with the Interior Department's Bureau of Biological Survey to form the new Fish and Wildlife Service, an element of the Interior Department.

=== Successor organizations ===
In 1956, the Fish and Wildlife Service was reorganized as the United States Fish and Wildlife Service and divided its operations into two bureaus, the Bureau of Sport Fisheries and Wildlife and the Bureau of Commercial Fisheries, with the latter inheriting the history and heritage of the old U.S. Fish Commission and U.S. Bureau of Fisheries. Upon the formation of the National Oceanic and Atmospheric Administration (NOAA) within the Department of Commerce on October 3, 1970, the Bureau of Commercial Fisheries merged with the saltwater laboratories of the Bureau of Sport Fisheries and Wildlife to form today's National Marine Fisheries Service (NMFS), an element of NOAA, and the former Bureau of Commercial Fisheries' research ships were resubordinated to the NMFS. During 1972 and 1973, these ships were integrated with those of other parts of NOAA to form the unified NOAA fleet. The NMFS is considered the modern-day successor to the U.S. Fish Commission and U.S. Bureau of Fisheries, and the NOAA fleet of today also traces its history in part to them.

== Activities ==
The U.S. Fish Commission and U.S. Bureau of Fisheries carried out extensive investigations of the fishes, shellfish, marine mammals, and other life in the rivers, lakes, and marine waters of the United States and its territories, and its scientists corresponded widely with marine researchers around the world. The two agencies also scrutinized fishing technologies and designed, built, and operated hatcheries for a wide variety of finfish and shellfish. In the early 1900s the Bureau of Fisheries took on the responsibility for the enforcement of fishery and sealing regulations in Alaska, as well as for managing the harvest of fur-brearing animals in the Pribilof Islands and supporting the welfare of the Aleut communities of the Pribilofs. Both the Fish Commission and the Bureau of Fisheries operated a fleet of ships and boats for research, law enforcement, and transportation purposes.

=== Research and publications ===
From 1871 to 1903, the commission's Annual Report to Congress detailed its efforts and findings in all of these areas. In 1880, it began to collect, analyze, and publish fishery statistics. From 1881 to 1903, the commission also published an annual Bulletin of the United States Fish Commission summarizing the commission's Annual Report to Congress and correspondence; the bulletins included detailed catch reports from fishermen and commercial fishing port agents around the United States and Canada, reports and letters from naturalists and fish researchers around the United States and in other countries, and descriptions of the commission's exploratory cruises and fish hatchery efforts. Beginning in 1884, the Commission published the seminal work The Fisheries and Fisheries Industries of the United States. The commission's research stations and surveys collected significant data on U.S. fish and fishing grounds, with considerable material going to the Smithsonian Institution.

The Bureau of Fisheries carried on the Fish Commission's research work, its scientists and researchers pioneering such concepts as fisheries oceanography and fishery products utilization research and publishing a wide variety of research results in the Bureau's Fisheries Service Bulletin—published monthly from June 1915 until December 1940—as well as a Bulletin of the Bureau of Fisheries series, an Investigational Reports of the Bureau of Fisheries series, an Administrative Reports series, Economic Circulars, Fishery Circulars, an annual Report of the Commissioner of Fisheries published from 1931 to 1939, and other documents. In 1937, the Bureau organized the Fishery Market News Service, which supported the U.S. commercial fishing industry by collecting and circulating information from widely scattered fisheries centers around the United States on fishery production, receipts, supply and demand, market prices, cold storage holdings, and imports and exports.

Four ships were built for the Fish Commission, including the 157-foot-long (47.9 m) schooner-rigged steamer USFC Fish Hawk, which served as a floating fish hatchery and fisheries research ship from 1880 to 1926; the 234-foot-long (71.3 m) brigantine-rigged steamer USFC Albatross, which operated as a fisheries research ship from 1882 to 1921 except for brief periods of United States Navy service in 1898 and from 1917 to 1919; and the 90-foot-long (27.4 m) sailing schooner USFC Grampus, which was commissioned in 1886 and operated as a fisheries research ship until 1917. The Bureau of Fisheries inherited these ships in 1903 and continued to operate a research fleet for a time, but it decommissioned its last true seagoing research ship, USFS Albatross II, in 1932, and when the Fish and Wildlife Service was created in 1940, it inherited no research vessels from the Bureau of Fisheries. The U.S. government did not operate another fisheries research vessel until the Fish and Wildlife Service commissioned US FWS Albatross III in 1948.

=== National Fish Hatchery System ===
When Congress expanded its mission to include fish culture in 1872, the Fish Commission laid the foundation for the National Fish Hatchery System, opening its first fish hatchery the same year. The Bureau of Fisheries and Fish and Wildlife Service carried on the fish hatchery program the Fish Commission began, and many of the fish hatcheries constructed by the Fish Commission before 1900 were among the 100 national hatcheries operating in 1960. The Edenton Station hatchery, established in 1899, is an example of a hatchery constructed by the Fish Commission prior to 1900.

To supplement the hatcheries, the Fish Commission commissioned the steamer USFC Fish Hawk in 1880. Purpose-built as a floating fish hatchery, she was intended to follow the seasonal runs of American shad up and down the coast of the United States, in addition to carrying out fisheries research duties. She operated until 1926.

=== Fishery regulation and enforcement ===
==== Alaska ====
After the United States purchased Russian America from the Russian Empire in 1867 and created the Department of Alaska (which became the District of Alaska in 1884 and the Territory of Alaska in 1912), enforcement of whatever regulations to protect fisheries and marine mammals that existed in Alaska fell to the revenue cutters of the United States Revenue-Marine, which in 1894 became the United States Revenue Cutter Service and was one of the ancestor organizations of the United States Coast Guard. By order of the United States Secretary of Commerce and Labor on February 15, 1905, the Bureau of Fisheries received the responsibility for administering and enforcing laws protecting the Alaskan salmon fishery. On June 14, 1906, the U.S. Congress passed the Alien Fisheries Act to protect and regulate fisheries in Alaska by placing restrictions on the use of fishing tackle and on cannery operations there and authorizing the U.S. Bureau of Fisheries to enforce these regulations as well. In 1920, the Bureau's Alaska responsibilities expanded again, to include supervision of the conservation of marine mammals there, including sea otters, fur seals, and walruses.

Upon receiving its law enforcement responsibilities in 1905–1906, the Bureau established regional districts throughout Alaska to organize fishery protection patrols along Alaska's 10,000 miles (16,000 km) of coastline, but had no vessels suitable for such patrols in Alaska, and during the next few years relied on vessels borrowed from other United States government agencies (such as the Revenue Cutter Service), on chartered vessels, and on transportation that canneries offered for free to Bureau of Fisheries agents. This approach was not satisfactory for various reasons, such as the requirement for vessels of other government agencies to perform non-fishery-related functions, ethical concerns over accepting transportation from the canneries the Bureau of Fisheries agents were supposed to regulate, and the difficulty of enforcing regulations when the local fishing and canning industry personnel warned one another of the approach of Bureau of Fisheries agents who had accepted transportation on cannery vessels. Each year after the 1906 passage of the Alien Fisheries Act, the Bureau of Fisheries requested more personnel and vessels with which to fulfill its regulatory and law enforcement responsibilities. By 1911, when the Alaska fishing industry reached an annual value of nearly US$17 million, it had become clear that the United States Government needed to make radical changes in how it enforced the provisions of the Alien Fisheries Act, including funding the acquisition of a fleet of dedicated fishery patrol vessels under the Bureau of Fisheries.

In 1912, the Bureau purchased the former cannery tender SS Wigwam to serve as its first fishery patrol vessel; renamed USFS Osprey—beginning a custom of naming the boats after birds common in Alaska—she was commissioned in 1913 and quickly added the protection of fur seal and sea otter populations to her responsibilities. The Bureau's first two purpose-built patrol vessels, USFS Auklet and USFS Murre, joined her in 1917. The Alaska enforcement fleet increased further in 1919 with four former United States Navy patrol vessels (USFS Kittiwake, USFS Merganser, USFS Petrel, and USFS Widgeon) transferred to the Bureau's Alaska fleet, and in 1925 the Bureau established a district headquarters at the Naknek River for the Bristol Bay district and began to acquire a flotilla of motor launches to operate on the rivers, steams, and lakes in that area. The Bureau also chartered vessels to support Alaska fisheries protection, and Bureau patrol boats regularly protected migrating fur seal herds along the coast of Washington and Alaska. On October 25, 1928, several Bureau of Fisheries vessels were tasked to join U.S. Navy vessels in enforcing the provisions of the Northern Pacific Halibut Act of 1924 in the Bering Sea and North Pacific Ocean, with their crews granted all powers of search and seizure in accordance with the act to protect populations of Pacific halibut. By 1930 the Bureau had nearly 20 boats patrolling in Alaskan waters. In 1933, it began to add speedboats to its Alaskan patrol inventory.

In 1918, the Bureau of Fisheries augmented its fishery enforcement effort with a force of "steam watchmen", temporary employees who worked two to five months a year and kept a particular area under continuous observation; they also occasionally maintained lights and protected free-floating fish traps from drift. The stream watchmen sometimes provided their own motorboats. From an initial force of 10 men in 1918, the stream watchman force—which operated in both Southeast and Southcentral Alaska—grew to 59 men in 1922 and 220 in 1931. In addition to stream watchmen, the Bureau also employed special wardens and operators of chartered boats to enforce fishery regulations.

The Bureau of Fisheries also began to use aircraft for fishery patrols in 1929, chartering a seaplane from Alaska-Washington Airways to experiment with aerial patrols over Alaskan waters. The aerial patrols were successful, and regular aerial patrols by Bureau of Fisheries agents using chartered aircraft began in 1930. The patrols focused on Southeast Alaska, and by 1939 logged an annual total of 6,859 miles (11,038 km) in 64 hours of flying.

The fishery enforcement vessels and aircraft also provided transportation to Bureau of Fisheries personnel and assisted in the Bureau's scientific activities in Alaska. In 1940, the Fish and Wildlife Service took over the fleet of patrol boats and the aerial patrol mission, and continued fishery enforcement operations, including the use of stream watchmen, wardens, and chartered boat operators. When Alaska became a state on January 3, 1959, it began to assume the responsibility for fishery protection in its waters like any other U.S. state. The Fish and Wildlife Service's role in fishery enforcement in Alaska came to an end on December 31, 1959; on January 1, 1960, the State of Alaska assumed full responsibility for fishery protection in its waters. The Fish and Wildlife Service transferred many of its patrol boats to the State of Alaska and refocused its resources on its scientific mission.

==== Elsewhere ====
In 1906, the Bureau of Fisheries became responsible for the enforcement of a law intended to regulate the taking of sponges in the Gulf of Mexico and off the coasts of Florida. It added the enforcement of a law governing the interstate transportation of black bass in 1930. Under the Fishery Cooperative Marketing Act of June 4, 1935—an act of Congress authorizing cooperative associations of producers of aquatic products—the Bureau became responsible for administering the act, maintaining contact with fishery cooperatives, and advising the cooperatives. In 1936 it became responsible for certain functions related to the Whaling Treaty Act.

=== Pribilof Islands and Pribilof tenders ===
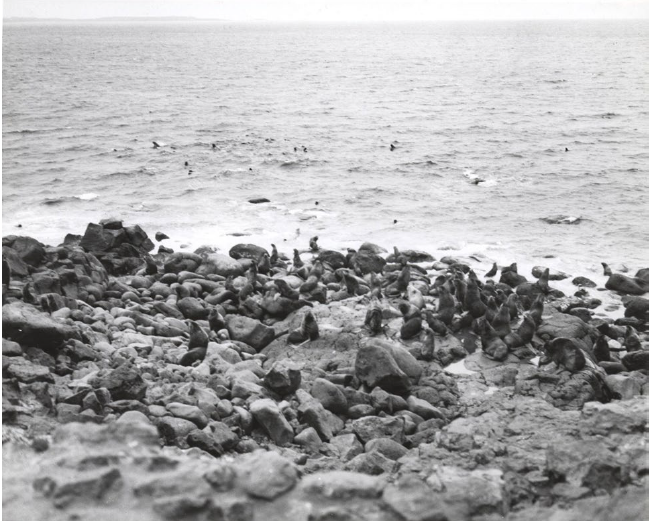
Fur seals in a rookery in the Pribilof Islands in the 1950s.

On April 21, 1910, the United States Congress assigned the responsibility for the management and harvest of northern fur seals, foxes, and other fur-bearing animals in the Pribilof Islands in the Bering Sea, as well as for the care, education, and welfare of the Aleut communities in the islands, to the Bureau of Fisheries. Under the protection and management first of the Bureau of Fisheries and later of the Fish and Wildlife Service, the Pribilof fur seal herd grew from 150,000 animals in 1911 to 1,500,000 in 1960.

To support the local Aleut community, the Bureau initially chartered commercial vessels to transport passengers and cargo to, from, and between the Pribilofs, but by 1915 it had decided that a more cost-effective means of serving the islands would be to own and operate its own "Pribilof tender", a dedicated cargo liner responsible for transportation to, from, and between the islands. Its first Pribilof tender, SS Roosevelt, operated from 1917 to 1919; she was followed by MV Eider from 1919 to 1930, and MV Penguin, which began operations in 1930.

Flag of the United States Commissioner of Fish and Fisheries

The operation of "Pribilof tenders" continued under the Bureau of Fisheries' successor organizations, with the Fish and Wildlife Service employing MV Penguin on this service until 1950, followed by MV Penguin II from 1950 to 1963, MV Dennis Winn, which supplemented Penguin II's service during the 1950s, and MV Pribilof, which entered service in 1963 and continued to serve the Pribilofs after the creation of the NMFS in 1970. The 58-year history of the "Pribilof tenders" did not come to a close until 1975, when the NMFS retired and sold Pribilof as part of a process of turning control of the local government and economy of the Pribilof Islands to their residents.

== U.S. commissioner of Fish and Fisheries ==
The United States commissioner of Fish and Fisheries oversaw the U.S. Fish Commission (1871–1903) and the U.S. Bureau of Fisheries (1903–1940). The following served as Commissioner of Fish and Fisheries:

No.	Portrait	Name	Tenure	Notes
1		Spencer Fullerton Baird (1823–1887)	1871–1887	Naturalist, ornithologist, ichthyologist, herpetologist, and museum curator, and the first curator to be named at the Smithsonian Institution. The founding commissioner of the Fish Commission, he was highly active in developing fishing and fishery policies for the United States, and was instrumental in making Woods Hole a research venue for marine biology. Died in office.
2		G. Brown Goode (1851–1896)	1887–1888	Ichthyologist, museum administrator, and prolific writer who worked for the Fish Commission from 1872 to 1888. From 1873 to 1887 organized and administered the biological and fishery development research of the Fish Commission and ordered and developed the taxonomic and ichthyologic work of both the Fish Commission and the Smithsonian Institution. Left the Fish Commission in 1888 to become an assistant secretary of the Smithsonian Institution.
3		Marshall McDonald (1835–1895)	1888–1895	Engineer, geologist, mineralogist, fish culturist, and fisheries scientist. Inventor of the fish ladder and of a number of fish-hatching apparatuses. Worked for the Fish Commission from 1879 to 1895. Died in office.
–		Herbert A. Gill	1895–1896	The Fish Commission's chief clerk, Gill served as acting commissioner between the death of Marshall McDonald and the arrival of John J. Brice.
4		John J. Brice (1841–1912)	1896–1898	Retired United States Navy officer with a sound administrative ability and a keen interest in the propagation of salmon on the United States West Coast. Reoriented the Fish Commission's priorities around the propagation of commercially important species.
5		George M. Bowers (1863–1925)	1898–1913	Banker and politician who later represented West Virginia's 2nd district in the United States House of Representatives from 1916 to 1923.
6		Hugh M. Smith (1865–1941)	1913–1922	Physician, educator, ichthyologist, and writer who worked for the Fish Commission and Bureau of Fisheries from 1886 to 1922. Directed the Fish Commission's scientific research from 1897 to 1903 and was deputy commissioner of fish and fisheries from 1903 to 1913. After leaving the Bureau, served as the first director general of Thailand's Department of Fisheries, then as curator of zoology at the Smithsonian Institution.
7		Henry O'Malley (1876–1936)	1922–1933	Fish culturist employed by the Fish Commission and Bureau of Fisheries from 1897 to 1934. Noted for his leadership as commissioner in protecting the American fishing industry and fish spawning grounds, especially the rehabilitation of depleted fishery resources in the Columbia River and the Territory of Alaska, as well as Alaska's fur seal resources.
8	Photo	Frank T. Bell (1883–1970)	1933–1939	Hotel and restaurant owner and operator who was politically active and an avid recreational fisherman and hunter with an interest in nature conservation. Successful as commissioner in making the Bureau of Fisheries more efficient and in increasing cooperation on fishery issues among United States government agencies and between them and U.S. state governments.
–		Charles E. Jackson	1939–1940	Deputy Commissioner Jackson served as acting commissioner between the departure of Frank T. Bell and the abolition of the Bureau of Fisheries.

== Fleet ==
The U.S. Fish Commission operated five ships. They used the prefix "USFC" while in commission. The Bureau of Fisheries inherited all five USFC ships, and its fleet expanded during the early 20th century. Its ships were given the prefix "USFS" while in commission, derived from an alternative name, "United States Fisheries Service", sometimes used for the Bureau. Although there were occasional exceptions (such as Grampus, Red Wing, and Roosevelt), the Fish Commission and Bureau of Fisheries custom was to name vessels after aquatic birds.

The later organizational history of the fleet paralleled that of the history of the Bureau's successor organizations. In 1940, the Fish and Wildlife Service (FWS) took over the Bureau of Fisheries fleet, and when the FWS was reorganized as the U.S. Fish and Wildlife Service (USFWS) in 1956, its seagoing ships were assigned to the USFWS's new Bureau of Commercial Fisheries (BCF), which inherited the history and heritage of the Fish Commission and Bureau of Fisheries. When the National Oceanic and Atmospheric Administration (NOAA) was created in 1970, its National Marine Fisheries Service (NMFS) was considered the successor to the BCF, and the NMFS took control of what had been the BCF's fleet. NMFS-controlled ships then were united with ships of other agencies to form a unified NOAA fleet via a phased process during 1972–1973. The Fish Commission and Bureau of Fisheries fleets therefore are among the ancestors of today's NOAA fleet.

A partial list of the ships of the U.S. Fish Commission (USFC) and U.S. Bureau of Fisheries (BOF):

- USFC (later USFS) Albatros (research vessel with USFC 1882–April 1898 and August 1898 – 1903, then BOF 1903–1917 and 1919–1924)
- USFS Albatross II (research vessel, BOF 1926–1932)
- USFS Auklet (patrol vessel, BOF 1917–1940; then FWS 1940–1950)
- USFS Blue Wing (patrol vessel, BOF 1924–1940; then FWS 1940–1950s)
- USFS Brant (patrol vessel, BOF 1926–1940; then FWS 1940–1953)
- USFS Crane (patrol vessel, BOF 1928–1940; then FWS 1940–1960)
- USFS Curlew (fish culture vessel, BOF 1919–1937/1938)
- USFS Eider (Pribilof tender and patrol vessel, BOF 1919–1940; then FWS 1940–1942 and 1946–late 1940s)
- USFC (later USFS) Fish Hawk (research and hatchery vessel, USFC 1880–May 1898 and September 1898 – 1903, then BOF 1903–1918 and 1919–1926)
- USFS Fulmar (research vessel, BOF 1919–1933/1934)
- USFC (later USFS) Grampus (research and fish-culture vessel, USFC 1886–1903, then BOF 1903–1917)
- USFS Halcyon (research vessel, BOF 1919–1927)
- USFS Kittiwake (patrol vessel, BOF 1919–1940; then FWS 1940–late 1940s)
- USFS Merganser (patrol vessel, BOF 1919–1940; then FWS 1940–ca. 1942–1943)
- USFS Murre (patrol vessel, BOF 1917–1940; then FWS 1940–1942)
- USFS Osprey (patrol vessel, BOF 1913–1921)
- USFS Pelican (research and patrol vessel, BOF 1930–1940; then FWS/USFWS 1940–1958, NMFS ca. 1970/1971 to 1972)
- USFS Penguin (Pribilof tender, BOF 1930–1940; then FWS 1940–1950)
- USFS Petrel (patrol vessel, BOF 1919–1934)
- USFC (later USFS) Phalarope (research and fish-culture vessel, USFC 1900–1903, then BOF 1903–1932/1933)
- USFS Red Wing (patrol vessel, BOF 1928–1939)
- USFS Roosevelt (Pribilof tender, BOF 1915–1919)
- USFS Scoter (patrol vessel, BOF 1922–1940; then FWS 1940–1949)
- USFS Teal (patrol vessel, BOF 1928–1940; then FWS/USFWS 1940–1960)
- USFS Widgeon (patrol vessel, BOF 1919–1940; then FWS 1940–ca. 1944–1945)

== Gallery ==
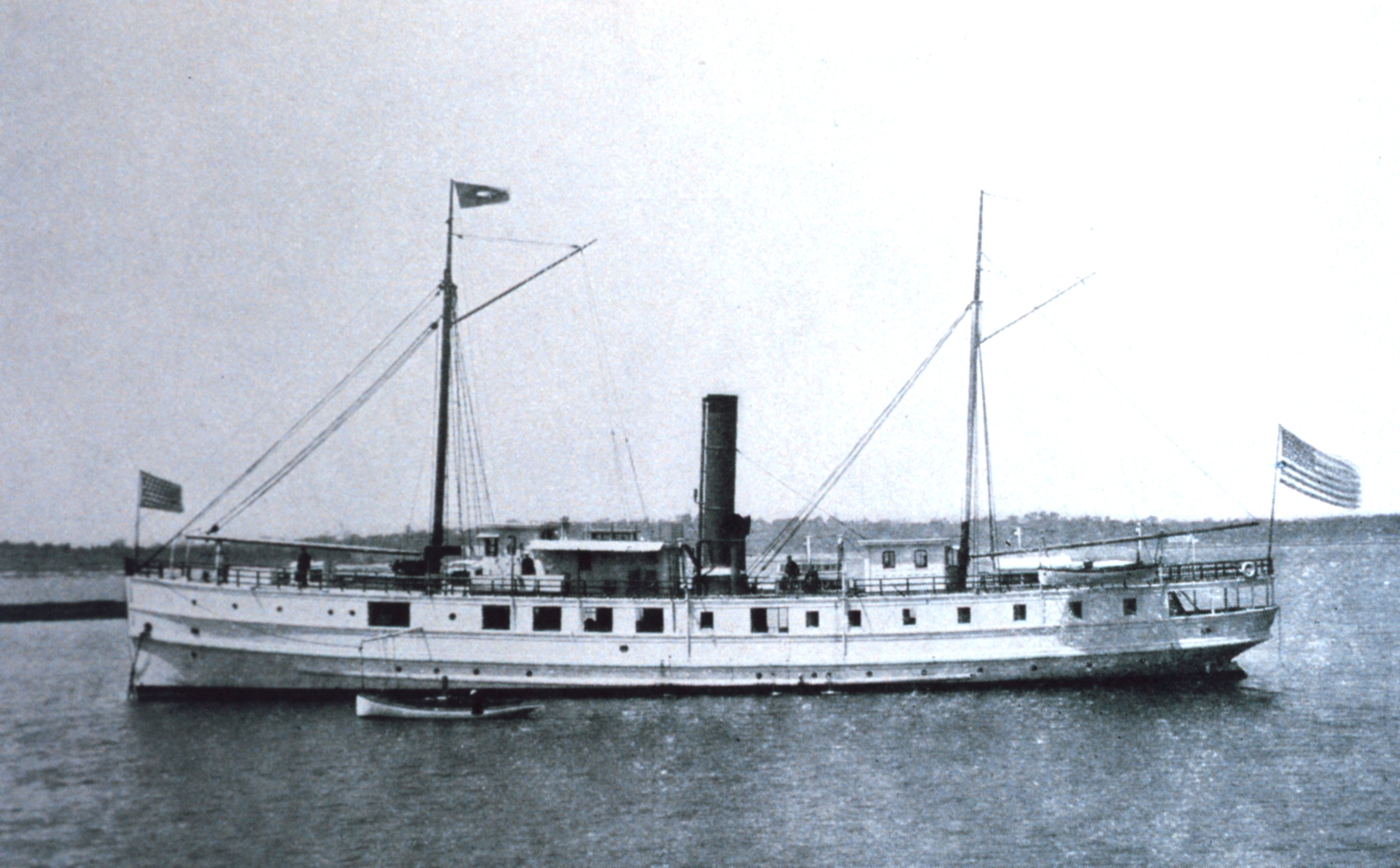
USFC Fish Hawk, c. 1900.

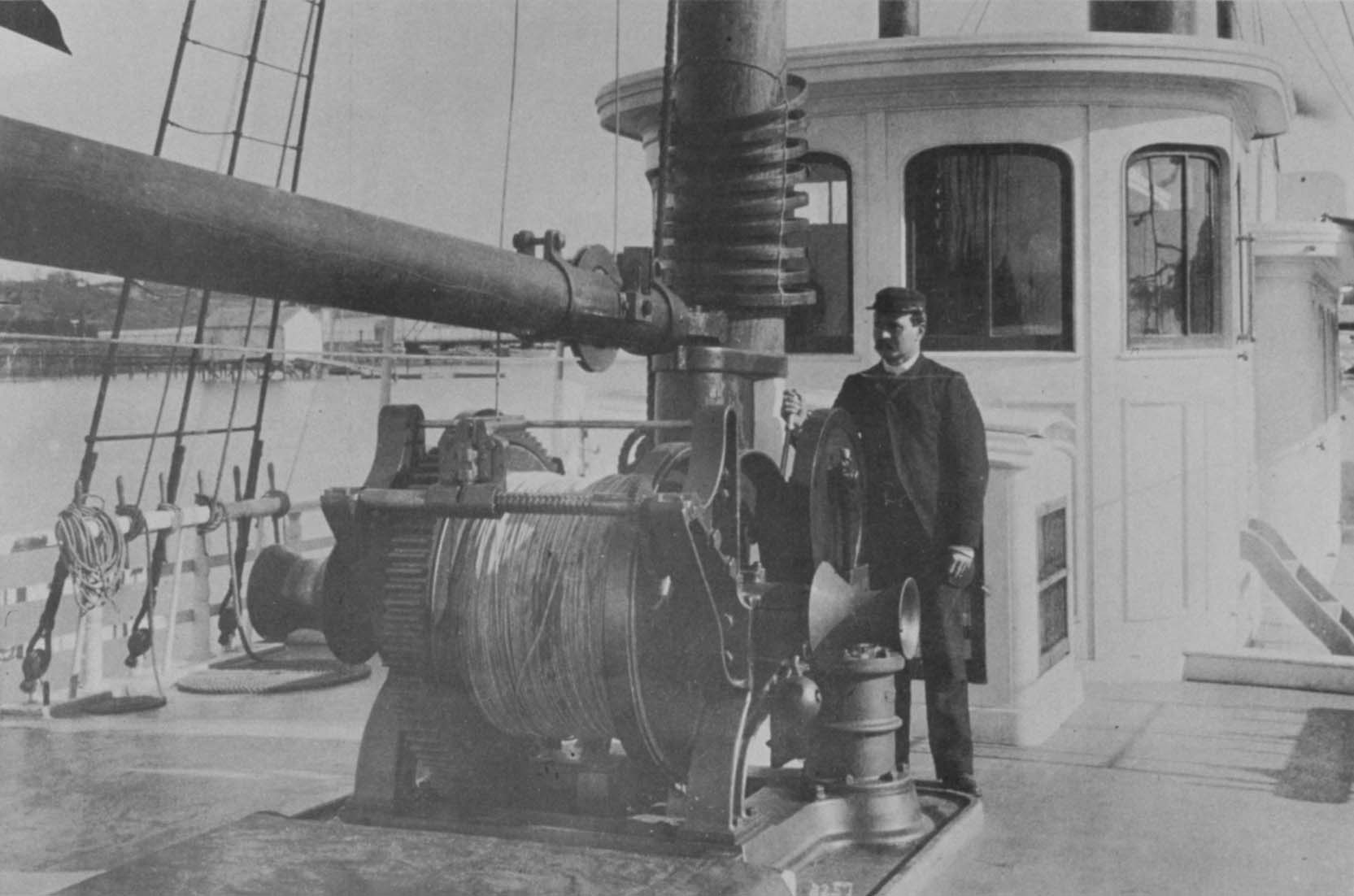
Hoist and winch on Fish Hawk, used by Commissioner Spencer Fullerton Baird and Professor Addison Emery Verrill in exploration of the New England coast, c. 1885.

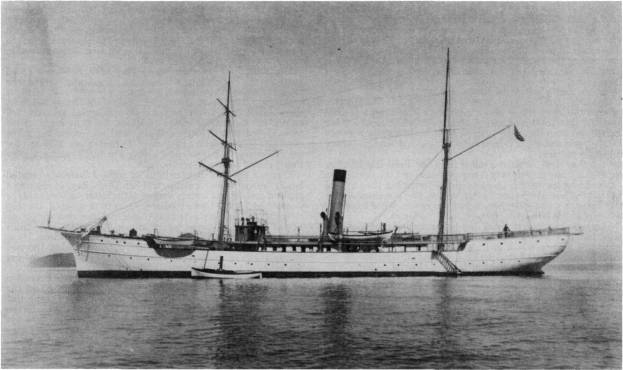
USFC Albatross in the 1890s.

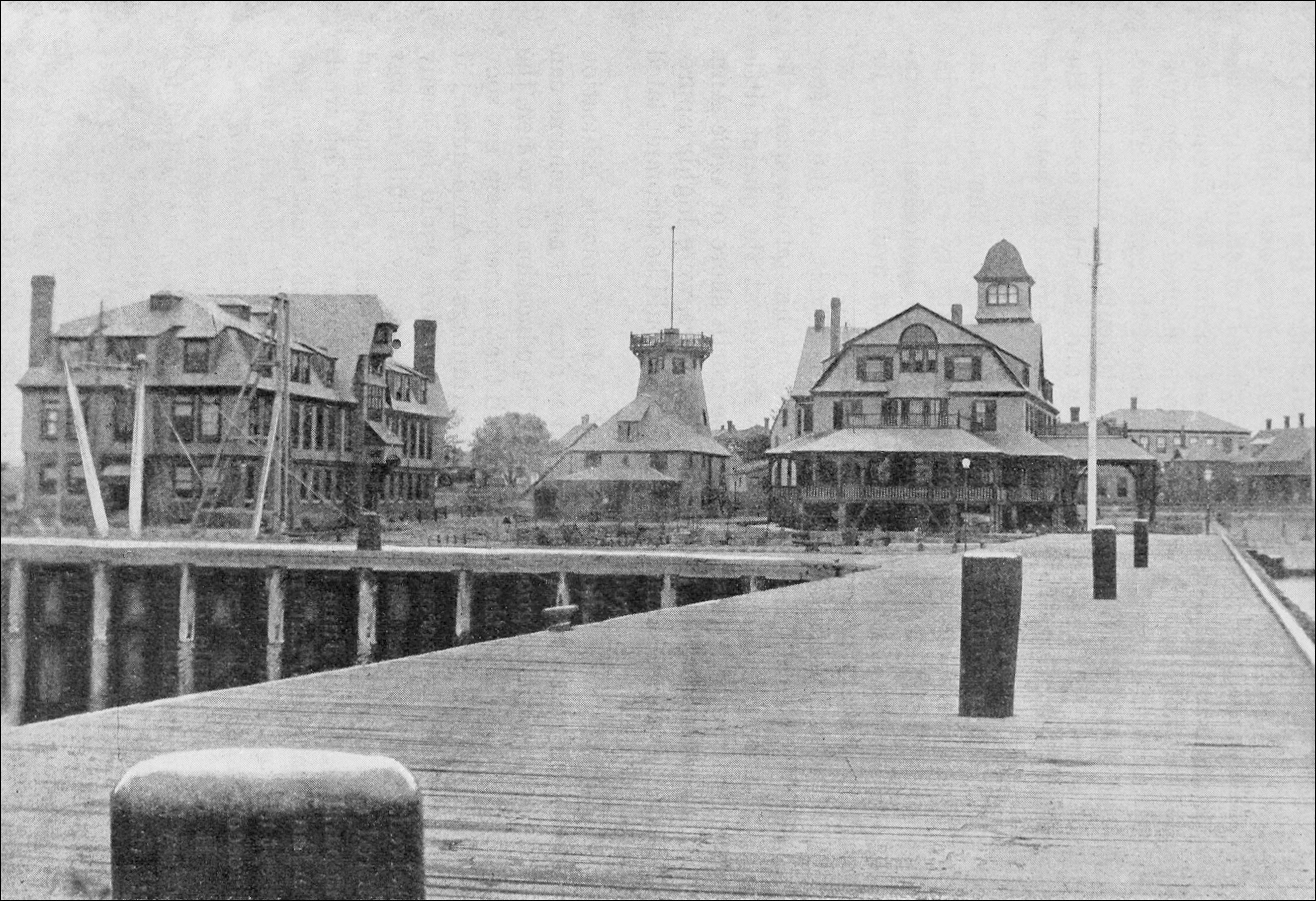
Fish Commission buildings and docks at Woods Hole, Massachusetts, c. 1892.

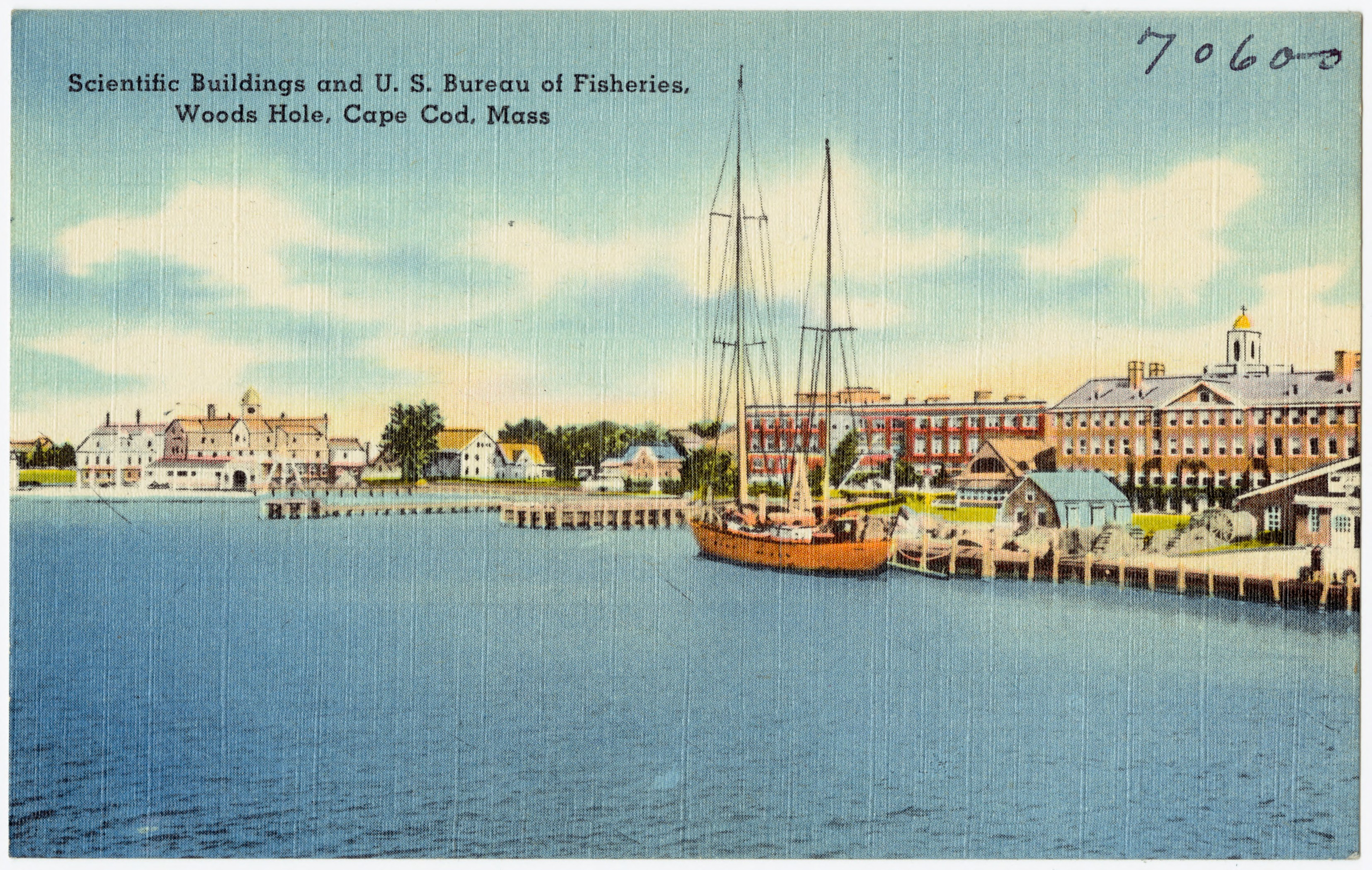
Postcard of U.S. Bureau of Fisheries buildings at Woods Hole, from sometime between c. 1930 and c. 1945.

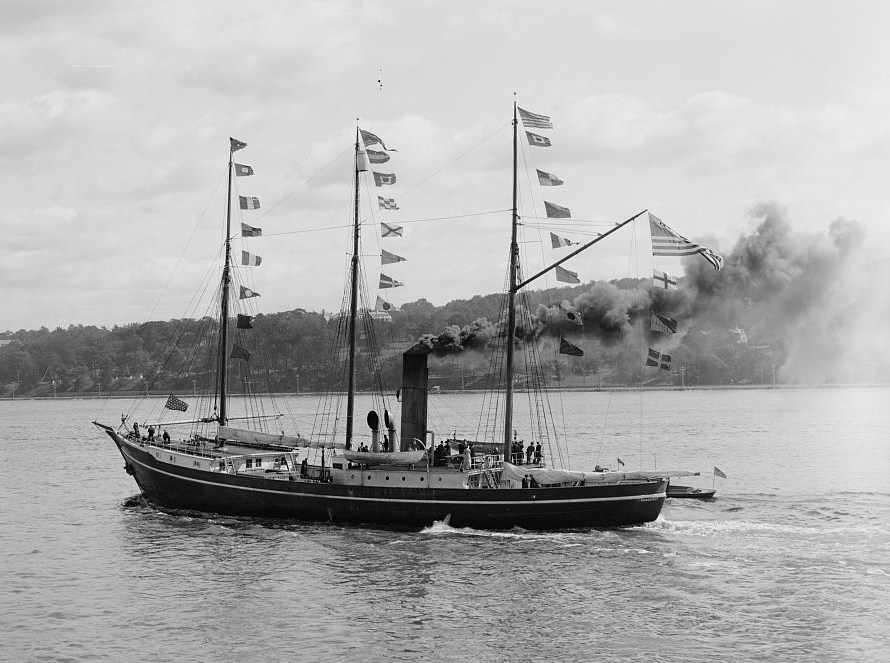
SS Roosevelt in 1909, prior to her 1917–1919 service as the "Pribilof tender".

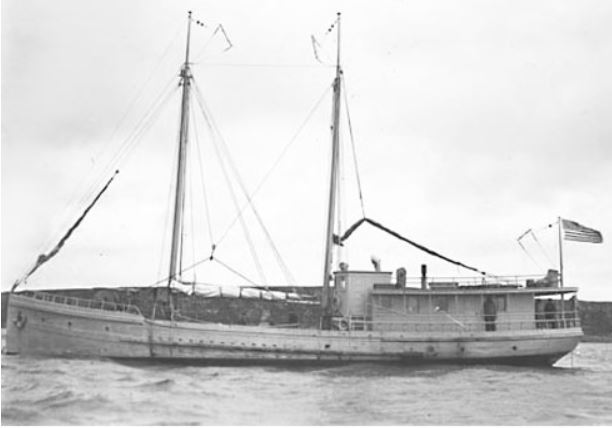
USFS Eider, "Pribilof tender" from 1919 to 1930.

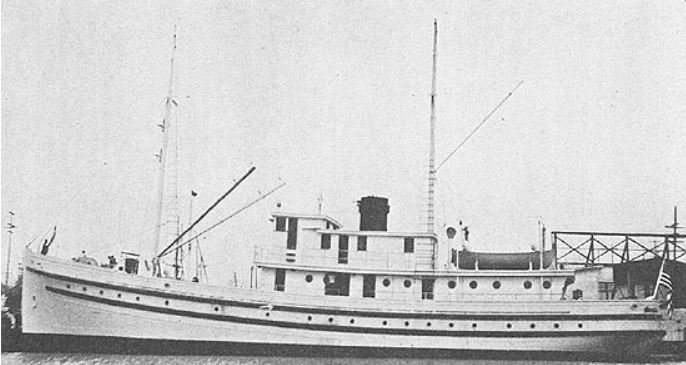
USFS/US FWS Penguin, "Pribilof tender" from 1930 to 1950.

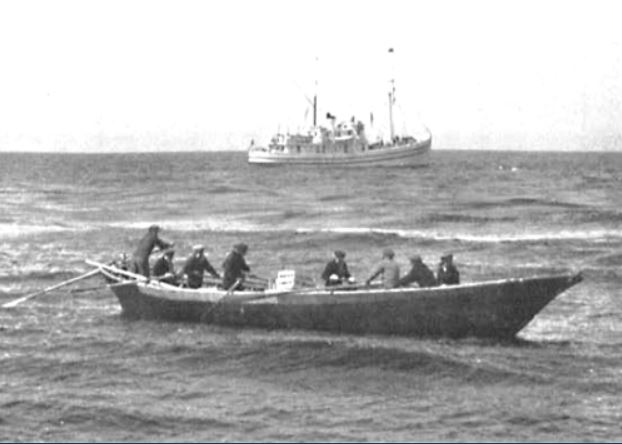
USFS Penguin (background) at anchor in the Bering Sea in 1939 while she unloads off St. George Island in the Pribilof Islands.
