= USFS Red Wing =

U.S. fishery patrol vessel

- Red Wing in 1919 as a United States Department of Agriculture motor schooner at Kalsin Bay, Kodiak Island, Territory of Alaska.

U.S. Department of Agriculture
- Name: Red Wing
- Fate: Transferred to U.S. Bureau of Fisheries 1926

U.S. Bureau of Fisheries
- Name: USFS Red Wing
- Namesake: Previous name retained
- Acquired: 1926
- Commissioned: 1928
- Decommissioned: 1939
- Fate: Condemned and dismantled August 1939

General characteristics (as BOF fishery patrol vessel)
- Type: Fishery patrol vessel
- Tonnage: 10 GRT
- Length: 40 ft (12.2 m)
- Beam: 11 ft (3.4 m)
- Draft: 3.5 ft (1.1 m)
- Propulsion: 1919: 1 × 40 hp (30 kW) engine; 1928: 1 × three-cylinder Standard gasoline engine
- Sail plan: 1919: Schooner rig
- Crew: 5

USFS Red Wing was an American fishery patrol vessel that operated in the waters of the Territory of Alaska as part of the United States Bureau of Fisheries (BOF) fleet from 1928 to 1939. Before her fishery service, she operated under the control of the United States Department of Agriculture.

== U.S. Department of Agriculture ==
In 1919, a National Geographic expedition to Katmai on the Alaska Peninsula photographed Red Wing at Kalsin Bay on Kodiak Island in the Territory of Alaska while she was operating under the control of the United States Department of Agriculture. At the time, she was a motor schooner used by the Department of Agriculture Kodiak station at Kalsin Bay for transportation to and from Kodiak.

== U.S. Bureau of Fisheries ==
The U.S. Bureau of Fisheries (BOF) acquired Red Wing from the Department of Agriculture in 1926. She remained out of commission at the BOF fish hatchery at Afognak Lake (also known as Litnik Lake) on Afognak Island in the Kodiak Archipelago while awaiting the installation of a new engine to replace her original 40-horsepower (30 kW) engine. She was outfitted with berths for a crew of five and, after the new engine – a three-cylinder Standard gasoline engine – and new fuel tanks were installed, she was commissioned in 1928.

The BOF assigned Red Wing fishery patrol duties in the Kodiak Archipelago. She also provided transportation for BOF personnel to and from the Afognak Lake salmon hatchery. In 1935 she began fishery patrols along the Alaska Peninsula.

While she was hauled out of the water for the 1938–1939 offseason, Red Wing suffered damage during an earthquake in the spring of 1939. As a result, she performed poorly on patrol during the 1939 fishing season, and the BOF cut her service short that year. The Bureau of Marine Inspection and Navigation assessed that her condition was so poor that she was not worth repairing. The BOF therefore condemned and dismantled Red Wing in August 1939.
