= US FWS Penguin II =

U.S. fisheries vessel

MV Penguin II
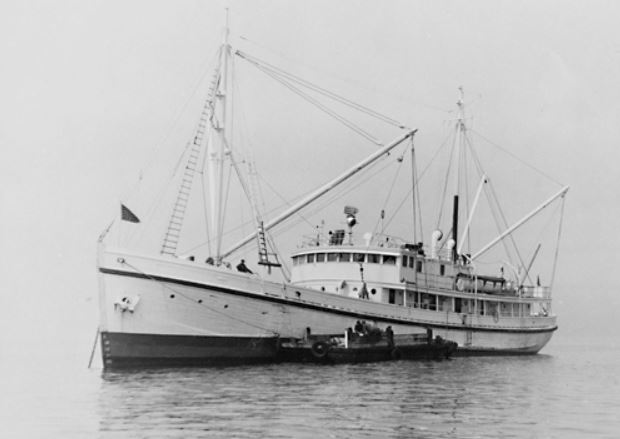
- US FWS Penguin II

United States Army
- Name: U.S. Army Lt. Raymond Zussman (FS-246)
- Namesake: Second Lieutenant Raymond Zussman (1917–1944), World War II U.S. Army Medal of Honor recipient
- Builder: Northwestern Shipbuilding Company, Bellingham, Washington
- Completed: June 1944
- Fate: Sold to U.S. Fish and Wildlife Service 9 June 1950

U.S. Fish and Wildlife Service
- Name: MV Lt. Raymond Zussman
- Namesake: Previous name retained
- Acquired: From United States Army 9 June 1950
- Commissioned: 1950
- Renamed: US FWS Penguin II 21 September 1950
- Namesake: USFS/US FWS Penguin, U.S. Bureau of Fisheries and Fish and Wildlife Service "Pribilof tender," 1930–1950
- Decommissioned: 1963
- Homeport: Seattle, Washington
- Fate: Sold 18 August 1964
- Status: Extant 1976 as Colombian commercial vessel Aurora

General characteristics as Fish and Wildlife Service cargo ship
- Type: U.S. Army Design 342 Freight and Supply (FS)
- Tonnage: 540 Gross register tons
- Length: 148 ft (45 m)
- Beam: 33 ft 3 in (10.13 m)
- Propulsion: 875-hp (740-kw) Fairbanks-Morse diesel engine
- Capacity: 20 passengers; 15,000 cubic feet (424.75 cubic meters) of cargo
- Crew: 14
- Sensors & processing systems: Radar
- Notes: Refrigeration added 1951

US FWS Penguin II was an American refrigerated cargo ship in commission in the fleet of the United States Fish and Wildlife Service from 1950 to 1963. She ran a cargo service between Seattle, Washington, and the Pribilof Islands, and also delivered provisions to Aleut communities on the Alaska Peninsula and in the Aleutian Islands. Prior to her fisheries service, she was the United States Army cargo ship U.S. Army Lt. Raymond Zussman (FS-246).

== Construction and U.S. Army service ==
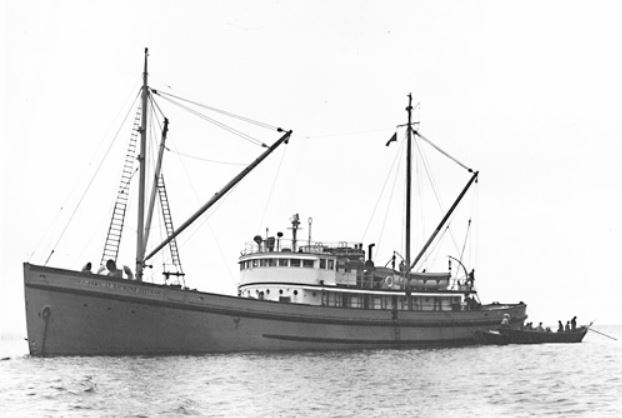
U.S. Army Lt. Raymond Zussman (FS-246), sometime between 1944 and 1950.

The Seattle, Washington, naval architect Harold Cornelius Hanson designed the vessel as a wooden-hulled coastal cargo ship. The official designation was Design 342 (Vessel, Passenger-Cargo, Diesel, Wood, 148') with only fifteen, FS-238 through FS-252, being built by three builders in Washington and California. (Note: Martinolich Repair, San Francisco, California built five, Northwestern Shipbuilding, Bellingham, Washington built six and Pacific Shipways, Anacortes, Washington built four.) The Northwestern Shipbuilding Company constructed her at Bellingham, Washington, and delivered her to the United States Army in June 1944 for use during World War II. The U.S. Army placed her in service as the "freight and supply" ship U.S. Army Lt. Raymond Zussman (FS-246) and retained the ship for use after the war.

== Fish and Wildlife Service ==
On 21 April 1910, the United States Congress assigned the responsibility for the management and harvest of northern fur seals, foxes and other fur-bearing animals in the Pribilof Islands in the Bering Sea, as well as for the care, education, and welfare of the Aleut communities in the islands to the United States Bureau of Fisheries. The United States Department of the Interior′s Fish and Wildlife Service – renamed the United States Fish and Wildlife Service (USFWS) after a 1956 reorganization – assumed these responsibilities when it replaced the Bureau of Fisheries in 1940. Since 1917, the Bureau of Fisheries and Fish and Wildlife Service had operated a "Pribilof tender" – a dedicated supply vessel used to transport passengers and cargo to and from the Pribilof Islands

On the night of 3 June 1950, the FWS Pribilof tender US FWS Penguin caught fire while moored at the FWS dock in Lake Union in Seattle. Before firefighters could extinguish the blaze, it destroyed her superstructure and cabins. Although her hull remained intact, the FWS determined that the cost of repairing the damage – originally estimated at US$15,000 to US$20,000, but later at US$75,000 – was more than the cost of replacing her. Before the fire, Penguin had been scheduled to depart Seattle for the Pribilofs with much-needed provisions on 13 June 1950, so the matter of replacing her was one of urgency. On 9 June 1950, the FWS purchased Lt. Raymond Zussman from the U.S. Army. The ship was faster and larger (540 gross register tons than Penguin (394 gross register tons), and, as US FWS Lt. Raymond Zussman, she departed Seattle for her first voyage to the Pribilofs on 17 June 1950, only four days later than Penguin′s scheduled departure. During the summer of 1950, United States Secretary of the Interior Oscar L. Chapman announced that Lt. Raymond Zussman would undergo a name change, saying, "The goodwill built up for 20 years in the name of the Penguin will not be lost...the vessel's successor has been named Penguin II." Accordingly, the FWS formally renamed the ship US FWS Penguin II on 21 September 1950. Penguin II made three round-trips between Seattle and the Pribilof Islands in 1950.

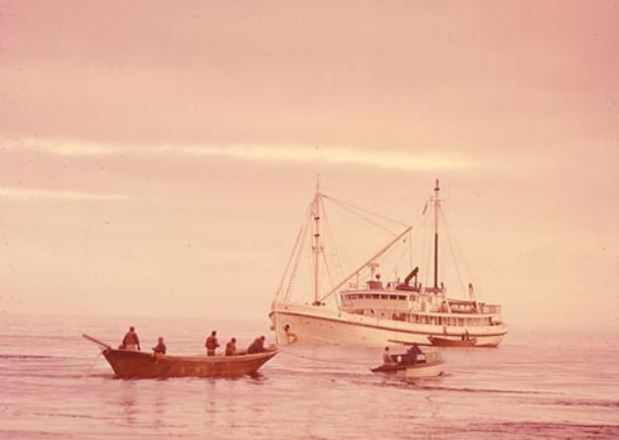
A baidara, or "bidarrah," better known today as an Umiak, is towed out to US FWS Penguin II to unload her while she rides at anchor in the Bering Sea off the Pribilof Islands in 1961. The lack of docking facilities for Penguin II in the Pribilofs necessitated this time-consuming method of lighterage there at the time.

Penguin II underwent renovations in February 1951 which gave her more cabin area, doubled her cargo capacity, and gave her ten times the refrigerated storage space of her predecessor Penguin; later, she also received an electromechanical steering system. She made five round trips between Seattle and the Pribilofs in 1952, during which she logged 26,387 nautical miles (48,869 km; 30,366 mi). She made six trips in 1953, logging 32,351 nautical miles (59,914 km; 37,229 mi) and carrying 612 passengers, 3,450 tons of general cargo, and 146,484 U.S. gallons (117,187 Imperial gallons; 554,502 liters) of fuel oil. She transported many of the 66,378 sealskins harvested in 1953 at the Pribilofs to Seattle.

In addition to making voyages between Seattle and the Pribilofs, Penguin II also made trips within the Pribilofs between Saint Paul Island and St. George Island to provide inter-island transportation for local passengers and cargo. She also delivered provisions to small Aleut communities on the Alaska Peninsula and in the Aleutian Islands. Each autumn, she delivered Christmas trees during her voyages. In 1956, the Fish and Wildlife Service was renamed the United States Fish and Wildlife Service (USFWS) as part of a reorganization that year that created the USFWS′s new Bureau of Commercial Fisheries (BCF), which thereafter maintained and operated Penguin II.

By the early 1960s, the demand for supplies in the Pribilof Islands had increased to the point that the BCF considered Penguin II too small to serve as its Pribilof tender. In October 1962, the U.S. Army loaned the refrigerated cargo ship FSR-791 to the BCF, which placed her in service as the new Pribilof tender US FWS Pribilof in 1963. Consequently, the BCF decommissioned Penguin II in 1963 and sold her at auction in Seattle on 18 August 1964.

== Later career ==
Penguin II was sold into commercial service. She was sighted in the Port of Los Angeles at Los Angeles, California, in 1976, operating under the Colombian flag with the name Aurora and with her home port at San Andrés in Colombia.
