= USS Raeo =

Patrol vessel of the United States Navy

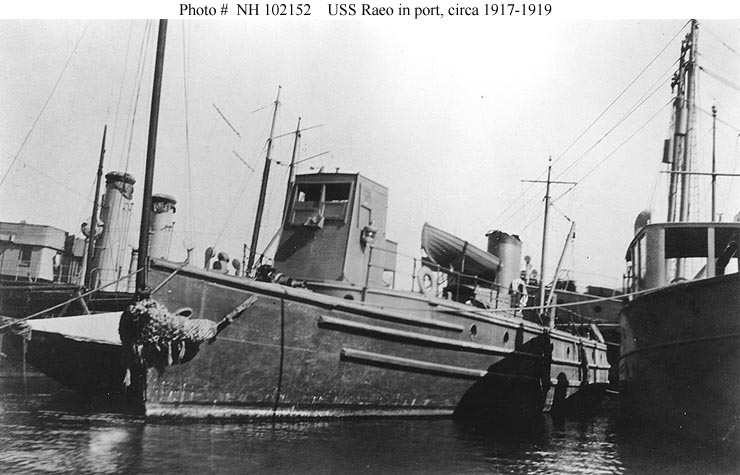
- USS Raeo (SP-588) in port sometime between 1917 and 1919.

History

United States
- Name: Raeo
- Owner: Ralph S. Townsend (1908); W. Schall (later)
- Builder: City Island Shipbuilding Company, City Island, the Bronx, New York
- Completed: 1908
- Fate: Sold to United States Navy 1917

United States Navy
- Name: USS Raeo
- Namesake: Previous name retained
- Cost: US$10,500
- Acquired: 1917
- Commissioned: 19 May 1917
- Stricken: 21 October 1919
- Fate: Transferred to U.S. Bureau of Fisheries 17 October 1919

U.S. Bureau of Fisheries
- Name: USFS Kittiwake
- Namesake: Kittiwake, a seabird of the genus Rissa in the gull family Laridae
- Acquired: 17 October 1919
- Identification: WTDG
- Fate: Transferred to Fish and Wildlife Service 30 June 1940

U.S. Fish and Wildlife Service
- Name: US FWS Kittiwake
- Namesake: Previous name retained
- Acquired: 30 June 1940
- Fate: Transferred to U.S. Navy 1942
- Acquired: From U.S. Navy May 1944
- Decommissioned: Sometime between 1945 and 1948
- Fate: Sold sometime between 1945 and 1948

United States Navy
- Name: USS YP-199
- Acquired: 1942
- Commissioned: 1942
- Stricken: 9 June 1944
- Fate: Transferred to U.S. Fish and Wildlife Service May 1944

United States
- Name: Raeo
- Namesake: Previous name restored
- Owner: Duwamish Shipyard, Inc., Seattle,–Washington
- Acquired: By 1948
- Home port: Seattle, Washington
- Notes: Fishing vessel

United States
- Name: Harbor Queen
- Owner: Tacoma Boat Mart and four others
- Home port: Tacoma, Washington; Seattle, Washington; La Conner, Washington
- Notes: Passenger, charter, and tour boat 1957–1997

United States
- Name: Entiat Princess
- Acquired: 1998
- Status: In service as of 2009
- Notes: Columbia River dinner cruises, tours and charters

General characteristics (as motor yacht)
- Type: Motor yacht
- Length: 73 ft (22.3 m) (overall); 69 ft 3 in (21.1 m) (waterline)
- Beam: 15 ft (4.6 m)
- Draft: 4 ft 4 in (1.3 m)
- Propulsion: 1 × 50 hp (37 kW) Standard engine
- Sail plan: Schooner rig; 800 square feet (74 m^{2}) of canvas, consisting of a foresail, mainsail, and inboard jib
- Speed: 11 mph (18 km/h)
- Range: 800 nmi (1,500 km; 920 mi) cruising radius at full speed

General characteristics (as U.S. Navy patrol boat, 1917–1919)
- Type: Patrol vessel
- Tonnage: 46 GRT
- Length: 73 ft (22 m)
- Beam: 15 ft (4.6 m)
- Draft: 4 ft 11 in (1.5 m)
- Propulsion: 1 × 50 hp (37 kW) Standard engine
- Speed: 10.5 knots (19.4 km/h; 12.1 mph)
- Complement: 12
- Armament: 1 × 1-pounder gun; 1 × machine gun

General characteristics (as BOF fishery patrol boat)
- Type: Fishery patrol vessel
- Tonnage: 46 GRT; 17 NRT
- Length: 70–73 ft (21.3–22.3 m)
- Beam: 15 ft (4.6 m)
- Draft: 5 ft (1.5 m)
- Propulsion: 1919: 1 × 50 hp (37 kW) Standard engine; 1923: 1 x 60–65 hp (45–48 kW) Union diesel engine
- Speed: 10 knots (19 km/h; 12 mph) (average)

General characteristics (as U.S. Navy patrol boat, 1942–1944)
- Type: Yard patrol boat
- Displacement: 30 tons
- Length: 73 ft (22 m)

USS Raeo (SP-588) was a United States Navy patrol vessel in commission from 1917 to 1919. Prior to her U.S. Navy service, she operated as the motor passenger vessel Raeo from 1908 to 1917. After the conclusion of her U.S. Navy career, she served as the fishery patrol vessel USFS Kittiwake in the United States Bureau of Fisheries fleet from 1919 to 1940 and as US FWS Kittiwake in the Fish and Wildlife Service fleet from 1940 to 1942 and from 1944 to at least 1945, and perhaps as late as 1948. During World War II, she again served in the U.S. Navy, this time as the yard patrol boat USS YP-199. She was the civilian fishing vessel Raeo from 1948 to 1957, then operated in various roles as Harbor Queen from 1957 to 1997. She became Entiat Princess in 1998 and as of 2009 was still in service.

== Construction and early career ==
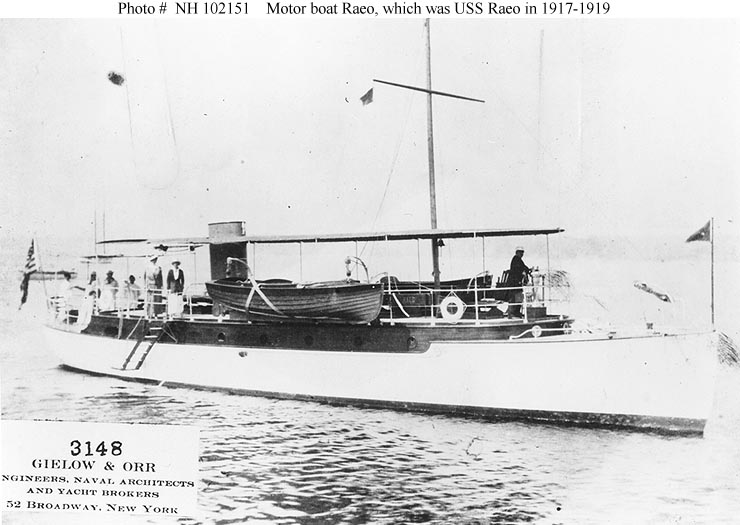
Raeo as a private motor yacht sometime between 1908 and 1917

Designed by the naval architecture firm of Gielow & Orr, Raeo was built as a private motor yacht of the same name by the City Island Shipbuilding Company at City Island in the Bronx, New York, for Ralph S. Townsend in 1908. Townsend decided to reverse the standard practice in motor yacht design of having the crew's quarters forward of the engine room and galley and accommodations for the owner and guests aft of them, instead placing the passenger accommodations forward, where they would be free of odors drifting aft from the engine room and galley while Raeo was underway and giving his guests and him access to a large foredeck, while the crew lived in the after part of the vessel and had access to the afterdeck. She was flush-decked, with a 45-foot (13.7 m) deck unbroken except by the main companionway, ventilation funnels, skylights, masts, and the helmsman′s stand, all of which were on the centerline, with a wide promenade on either side. The helmsman's stand was located on the forward end of the main deck. Below decks she had two state rooms and a saloon for dining and socializing. The crew's compartment aft had a floor space of 200 square feet (19 m^{2}) and contained the galley, the engine, storage space, and two hammock berths. She was well-lighted by skylights and portholes, and also had acetylene gas lamps for lighting throughout, and her ventilation funnels offered ample ventilation of her interior spaces.

Raeo had a 50-horsepower (37 kW) Standard engine that gave her a speed of 11 miles per hour (18 km/h). She carried sufficient fuel for a cruising radius of 800 nautical miles (1,500 km; 920 mi) at full speed. She was schooner-rigged, and carried 800 square feet (74 m^{2}) of canvas consisting of a foresail, a mainsail, and an inboard jib. She had fresh water tanks with a combined capacity of 800 US gallons (3,000 L; 670 imp gal), enough to last her crew and passengers a month, and an icebox capable of holding a week's worth of frozen foods. Her shallow draft allowed her access to a wide variety of small harbors and inlets, and her relatively wide beam gave her stability and provided ample room for her passengers on her deck.

Townsend later sold Raeo to W. Schall. As a motor yacht, Raeo was home-ported in the New York City area.

== U.S. Navy service, 1917–1919 ==
In 1917, the United States Navy purchased Raeo from Schall for US$10,500 for use as a section patrol boat during World War I. She was commissioned as USS Raeo (SP-588) on 19 May 1917. Assigned to the 2nd Naval District in southern New England and based at Newport, Rhode Island, Raeo carried out patrols through the end of World War I on 11 November 1918 and into 1919.

Under an executive order dated 24 May 1919 addressing the disposition of vessels the Navy no longer required, Raeo was among several vessels designated for transfer to the United States Bureau of Fisheries (BOF). Raeo was transferred to the BOF on 17 October 1919 and stricken from the Navy List on 21 October 1919.

== U.S. Bureau of Fisheries ==
The Bureau of Fisheries renamed the vessel USFS Kittiwake and placed her in service at the BOF station at Gloucester, Massachusetts, where she performed fish culture work. After undergoing repairs and an extensive overhaul carried out by the crew of the BOF fisheries science research vessel USFS Halcyon during August and September 1922 at the BOF station at Woods Hole, Massachusetts, Kittiwake departed Woods Hole and proceeded to Norfolk, Virginia, where she arrived on 3 November 1922. She was loaded aboard a U.S. Navy vessel at the Norfolk Navy Yard in Portsmouth, Virginia, and transported to Seattle, Washington, where she arrived in the spring of 1923. At Seattle, a new 60-to-65-horsepower (45 to 48 kW) Union diesel engine was installed aboard her.

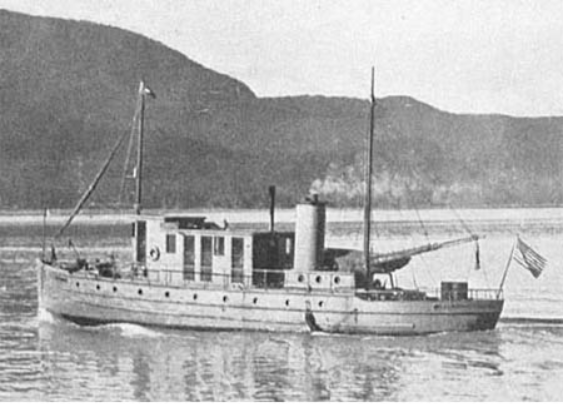
USFS Kittiwake in 1924.

With her new engine, Kittiwake proceeded to the Territory of Alaska to begin service as a BOF fishery patrol vessel in the summer of 1923, initially operating in the Cook Inlet and Prince William Sound districts on the coast of Southcentral Alaska, where she transported passengers in addition to carrying out her patrol duties. During 1923, she also began patrols to protect fur seal and sea otter populations. She logged 11,000 nautical miles (20,000 km; 13,000 mi) on patrol duty during the 1926 fishing season. In 1927, she transported materials for the construction of a 38-foot (11.6 m) weir at Chinik Creek in Kamishak Bay on the coast of Southcentral Alaska. On 25 October 1928, she was among several BOF vessels tasked to assist U.S. Navy vessels in enforcing the provisions of the Northern Pacific Halibut Act of 1924 in the Bering Sea and North Pacific Ocean, with her crew granted all powers of search and seizure in accordance with the act to protect populations of Pacific halibut.

Sometime around 1930, Kittiwake was assigned to summer patrols in the Seward/Katalla district in Southcentral Alaska, and later she was reassigned again to patrol in the waters of Southeast Alaska. During the winter of 1933–1934, she was one of several BOF vessels to receive an extensive overhaul funded by a US$20,000 allocation by the Public Works Administration. In the mid-1930s, she assisted in operations to tag herring and pink salmon in Alaskan waters. On 30 July 1938, she struck an uncharted rock in Moira Sound on the east side of the southern end of Prince of Wales Island in the Alexander Archipelago in Southeast Alaska; she underwent repairs at Ketchikan, Territory of Alaska.

== Fish and Wildlife Service, 1940–1942 ==
In 1939, the BOF was transferred from the United States Department of Commerce to the United States Department of the Interior, and on 30 June 1940, it was merged with the Interior Department's Division of Biological Survey to form the new Fish and Wildlife Service, an element of the Interior Department destined to become the United States Fish and Wildlife Service in 1956. Kittiwake thus became part of the FWS fleet as US FWS Kittiwake.

== U.S. Navy service, 1942–1944 ==
In 1942, the U.S. Navy acquired Kittiwake for World War II service, designating her as a yard patrol boat and renaming her USS YP-199. Assigned to the Thirteenth Naval District Inshore Patrol, as of 15 May 1942 she was based at Section Base, Port Townsend in Port Townsend, Washington. The Navy employed her as a utility vessel and dispatch boat in and around Puget Sound. The Navy returned YP-199 to FWS control in May 1944 and struck her from the Navy list on 9 June 1944.

== Fish and Wildlife Service from 1944 ==
Returning to her FWS name, Kittiwake spent the rest of 1944 undergoing renovations to prepare her to return to fishery patrol duty during the fishing season in 1945. Sometime between 1945 and 1948, the FWS decommissioned and sold her.

== Later career ==
By 1948, the vessel had returned to her original name, Raeo, and was owned by Duwamish Shipyard, Inc, in Seattle, classified as a fishing vessel. In 1957, a Washington boat service company, Tacoma Boat Mart, acquired her and renamed her Harbor Queen. Until 1997, she operated as Harbor Queen in Puget Sound under five different owners as a passenger, charter, and tour boat, home-ported at various times at Tacoma, Seattle and La Conner, Washington.

In 1998, the vessel was sold at Seattle. Her new owners renamed her Entiat Princess and removed her upper decks so she could be transported to Wenatchee, Washington, where they had her converted into a sternwheeler. As of 2009, the 101-year-old Entiat Princess was in service on the Columbia River, providing dinner cruises, charters, and tours.
