= Atlas-Imperial =

American diesel engine manufacturer

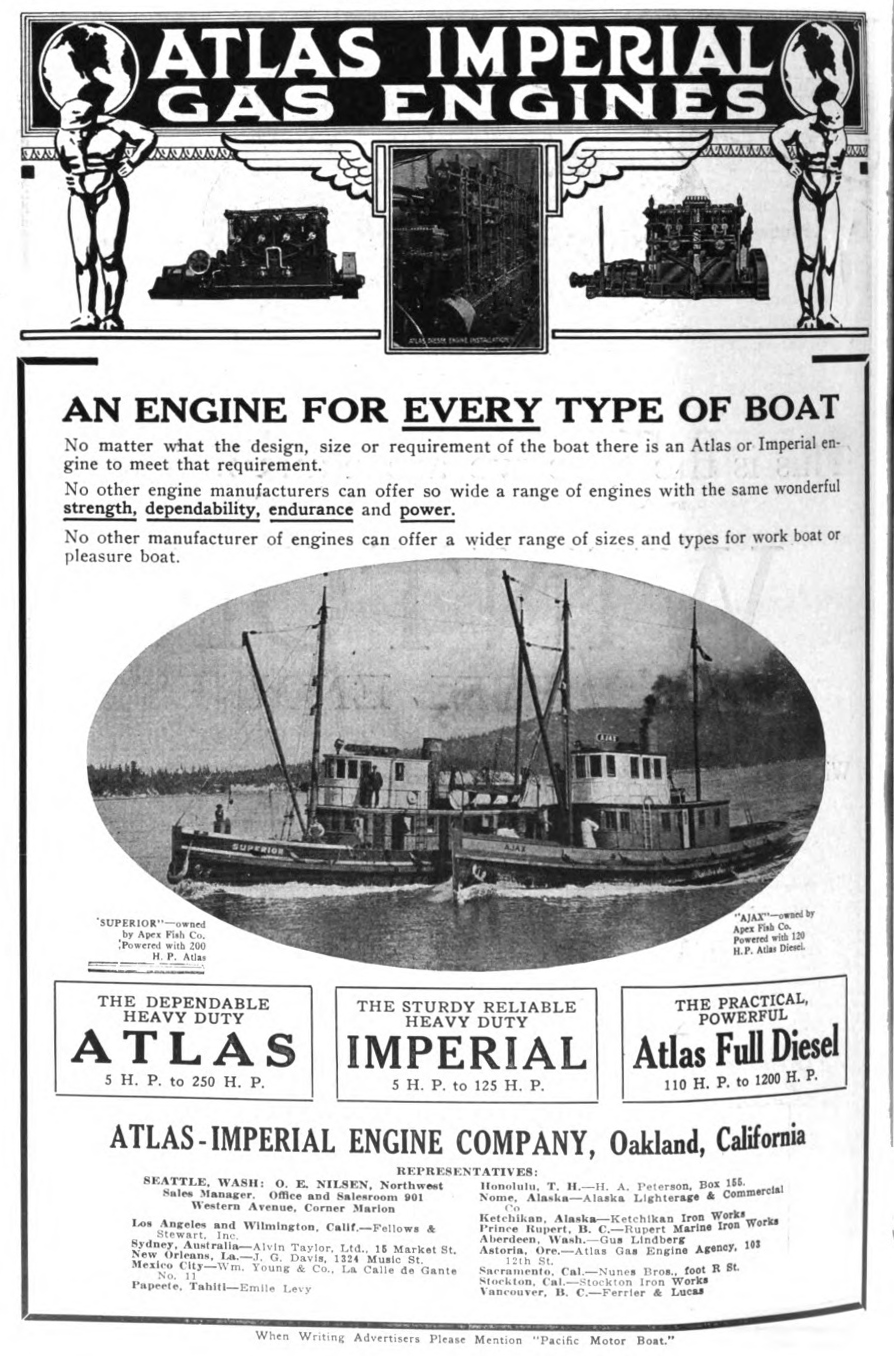
Atlas Imperial Advertisement from April 1918 issue of Pacific Motorboat.

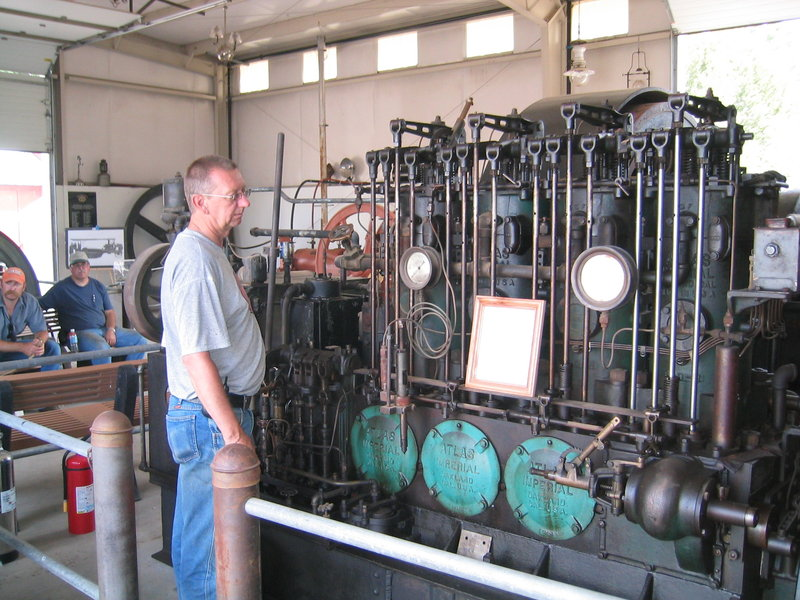
An Atlas-Imperial diesel tugboat engine in Brooks, Oregon

Atlas-Imperial Diesel Engine Company was an American manufacturer of diesel engines based in Oakland, California. The company was created in 1916 when two early gasoline engine companies combined to manufacture diesel engines, following the expiration of Rudolph Diesel's patents.

The company made diesels for tugboats, fishboats, coasters, yachts, lightvessels, and other ships. The company produced engines in a variety of sizes and ratings, from a 2-cylinder model that generated 30 horsepower (22 kW) to an 8-cylinder model that generated 600 horsepower (450 kW). Known for their reliability and serviceability, Atlas diesels were installed in workboats around the world. While the Atlas-Imperial factory closed in the 1950s, its engines continued to power vessels well into the era of high-speed, small-cylinder diesel technology. Today, numerous Atlas Imperial engines remain, with some still in operational condition.
