= Fish Hawk =

Fish Hawk may refer to:

- Fish hawk, an alternative name for the osprey
- Fish Hawk (film), a 1979 Canadian drama film
- FishHawk, Florida, a census-designated place in Hillsborough County, Florida, in the United States, named after FishHawk creek
- USFC Fish Hawk, a fisheries research ship – the first large vessel constructed for the promotion of fisheries – in service with the United States Commission of Fish and Fisheries and the Bureau of Fisheries from 1880 to 1926
