= USS Tanner =

Oceanographic research ship of the United States Navy

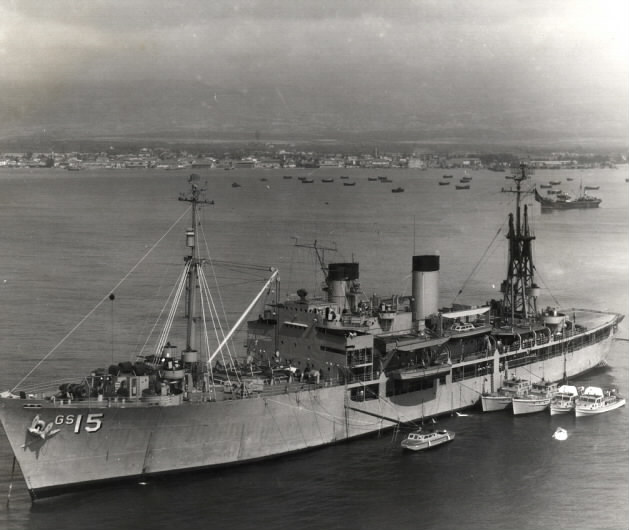
- USS Tanner

History

United States
- Name: Pamina (1945–1946); Tanner (1946–1969)
- Namesake: The asteroid Pamina; Zera Luther Tanner
- Builder: Walsh-Kaiser Company, Providence, Rhode Island
- Laid down: 1944
- Launched: 5 January 1945
- Commissioned: 10 February 1945, as USS Pamina (AKA-34)
- Decommissioned: 14 July 1969
- Renamed: Tanner, 15 May 1946
- Reclassified: AGS-15, 15 May 1946
- Stricken: 1 August 1969
- Honours and awards: 1 battle star (WWII)
- Fate: Transferred to Maritime Administration for disposal

General characteristics
- Class & type: Artemis-class attack cargo ship
- Type: S4–SE2–BE1
- Displacement: 7,000 long tons (7,112 t)
- Length: 426 ft (130 m)
- Beam: 58 ft (18 m)
- Draft: 16 ft (4.9 m)
- Propulsion: 2 × Turbo-electric engines, twin shafts, 6,000 shp (4,474 kW)
- Speed: 17 knots (31 km/h; 20 mph)
- Boats & landing craft carried: As Pamina; 1 × LCP(L) (Landing Craft, Personnel, Large); 12 × LCVP (Landing Craft, Vehicle, Personnel); 8 × LCM(3) (Landing Craft Mechanized)
- Troops: As Pamina : 264
- Complement: 303 officers and enlisted
- Armament: 1 × 5"/38 caliber gun mount; 4 × twin 40 mm gun mounts; 16 × 20 mm gun mounts

USS Tanner (AGS-15) was originally built as USS Pamina (AKA-34), an Artemis-class attack cargo ship named after the minor planet 539 Pamina, which in turn was named after a character in Mozart's opera The Magic Flute. However, early in the ship's service it was reclassified AGS-15 and renamed Tanner. She served as a commissioned ship for 24 years and 4 months.

== Service history ==
Pamina was laid down in 1944 by the Walsh-Kaiser Company at Providence, Rhode Island. The ship was launched on 5 January 1945, sponsored by Mrs. Ralph M. Johnston. The vessel was commissioned 10 February 1945.

=== USS Pamina, 1945–1946 ===
Following shakedown Pamina transited the Panama Canal and reported to Amphibious Force, Pacific Fleet, Pearl Harbor. After intensive training with other vessels of her type, she departed Pearl Harbor on 22 April and arrived at Okinawa on 15 May to deliver cargo and to render assistance to combat operations ashore. She operated in the South, Southwest and Western Pacific areas for the remainder of World War II. Immediately thereafter she transported occupation forces to Japan and returning servicemen to the United States. Pamina was reclassified AGS-15 and renamed Tanner 15 May 1946.

=== USS Tanner, 1946–1969 ===
Pamina was renamed Tanner in honor of U.S. Navy captain and oceanographer Zera Luther Tanner. After sea trials during November and December, Tanner conducted hydrographic survey operations off the east coast of Mexico. She continued similar activities in the same area, off Labrador, off Trinidad and off Venezuela for the next four years. In January 1951, she began survey work in the Bahamas in connection with a guided missile testing range, work which she continued with only occasional missions elsewhere until the summer of 1952. At that time she returned northward and after a period in New York Naval Shipyard proceeded to northwest Greenland for extensive priority survey work. She concluded the season with a survey of a small island in the Canadian Arctic where a harbor was named "Tanner Bay" in her honor. From 1954 to 1958, Tanner operated primarily off the southern coast of Turkey with 27,255 miles (43,863 km) steamed during 139 days in the survey area in the spring and summer of 1956. Again in the Bahamas in 1959, she became part of the Persian Gulf Survey Unit later that year. After extensive work in the Near East, she conducted research in the Barents Sea in 1963, in the deep dive area off Norfolk in 1964, and in the northern Aegean Sea 15 November 1965 to 15 March 1966. Tanner deployed 19 October from Pearl Harbor for survey operations in the South China Sea off the Mekong Delta coast of South Vietnam. She returned to the coast of South Vietnam and to the Gulf of Thailand in 1967 and 1968.

Following survey operations in the Western Pacific early in 1969 and with long and distinguished service to her credit, Tanner began her decommissioning process on 14 July. She was struck from the Naval Vessel Register 1 August and transferred to the Maritime Administration for disposal.

Pamina received one battle star for World War II service.
