= USS Albatross (1882) =

US Navy steamship and research vessel

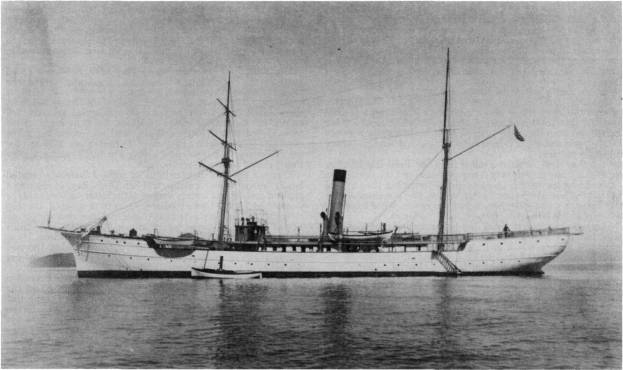
- Albatross, c. 1890

History

United States
- Name: Albatross
- Namesake: Albatross
- Ordered: 1881
- Builder: Pusey and Jones, Wilmington, Delaware
- Cost: $190,000
- Laid down: March 1882
- Launched: 9 August 1882
- Commissioned: 11 November 1882
- Decommissioned: 29 October 1921
- Reclassified: Auxiliary Cruiser, 21 April 1898; Research Vessel, 8 September 1898; Gunboat, 19 November 1917; Research Vessel, 23 June 1919
- Identification: Code letters: NQY
- Fate: Sold, 16 June 1924

General characteristics
- Type: research ship
- Tonnage: 691 GRT; 470 NRT
- Displacement: 638 long tons (648 t)
- Length: 234 ft (71 m) overall; 200 ft (61 m) registered
- Beam: 27 ft 6 in (8.38 m)
- Draft: 16 ft 9 in (5.11 m)
- Installed power: 2 × compound steam engines; 109 shp (81 kW)
- Propulsion: 2 × screws
- Sail plan: 1882: brigantine; 1913: schooner
- Speed: 10 kn (19 km/h; 12 mph)
- Complement: 110
- Armament: Auxiliary Cruiser: 2 × 20-pounder guns; 2 × 37 mm guns; 1 × 53 mm gun; 2 × Gatling guns; Gunboat: 4 × 6-pounder guns; 1 × Colt automatic gun

The second USS Albatross, often seen as USFC Albatross in scientific literature citations, was an iron-hulled, twin-screw masted steamship in the United States Navy and reputedly the first research ship ever built specially for marine research. She was named for the albatross.

== Construction ==
Albatross was laid down in March 1882, by Pusey and Jones, in Wilmington, Delaware. She was launched on 19 August 1882, and commissioned on 11 November 1882, with Lt. Zera L. Tanner, in command. Tanner, who had superintended the ship's design and construction, commanded Albatross, a Navy-crewed ship assigned to the United States Fish Commission, a civilian government agency, for nearly 12 years.

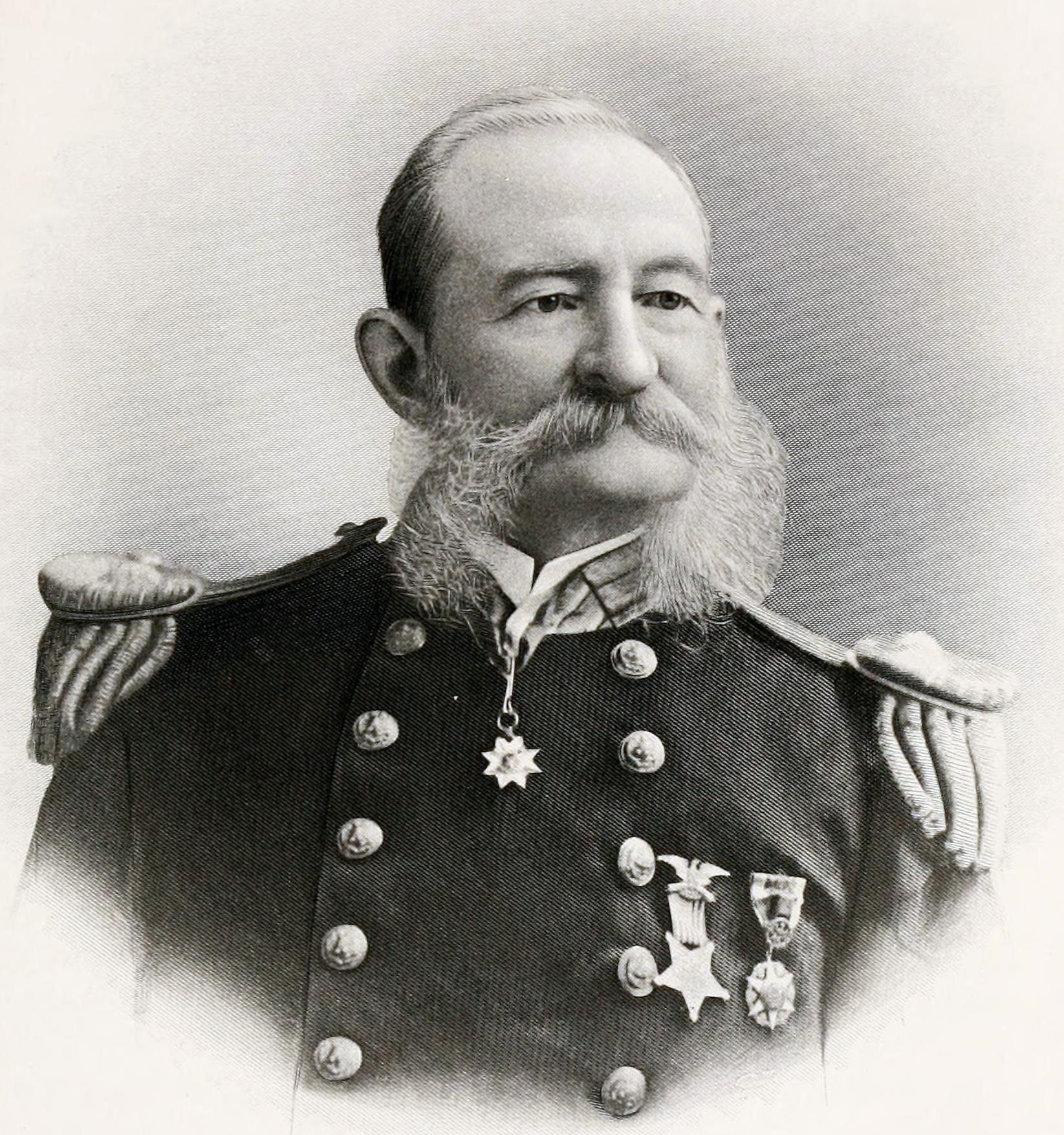
Zera Tanner, USS Albatross commander from 1882 to 1894

=== Design ===
Albatross had an iron hull with a registered length of 200 ft (61 m), a 27 ft 6 in (8.38 m) beam, and draft of 16 ft 9 in (5.11 m). Her tonnages were 691 GRT, 470 NRT, and 638 long tons (648 t) displacement. She had two screws, each powered by a two-cylinder compound steam engine. Between them, her twin engines were rated at 109 hp (81 kW) and gave her a speed of 10 kn (19 km/h; 12 mph).

== Service history ==
=== Early service ===
Following trial operations between Wilmington and Washington, D.C., from 30 December 1882 to 13 February 1883, Albatross returned to her builder's yard for engine alterations. While steaming back to Washington, the ship experimented with her dredging equipment, and arrived at the nation's capital on 25 March 1883. She left the Potomac River, on 24 April, and proceeded to Woods Hole, Massachusetts, which was her base for several months of operations investigating the "migrations of mackerel, menhaden, and other migratory species." During this period, she also made shorter dredging trips out of Woods Hole, to the Gulf Stream and the tilefish grounds.

Over the first months of 1884, the ship operated out of Norfolk, Virginia, and at the Navy's request, conducted hydrographic work in the Caribbean, carrying out "biological investigations" afloat and ashore. From 12 July to 23 October 1884, she operated principally between Woods Hole, and the nation's capital, but also ranged from the Virginia capes, to the Gulf of Maine. As she plied these waters, her embarked scientists observed the movements of surface fish, examined the former tilefish grounds, and studied the "influence of the Gulf Stream on bottom fauna." While underway, she also made dredge hauls and conducted fishing trials. "At (the) service of the Secretary of the Navy" between 26 August and 2 September, Albatross took part in the review of the North Atlantic Squadron.

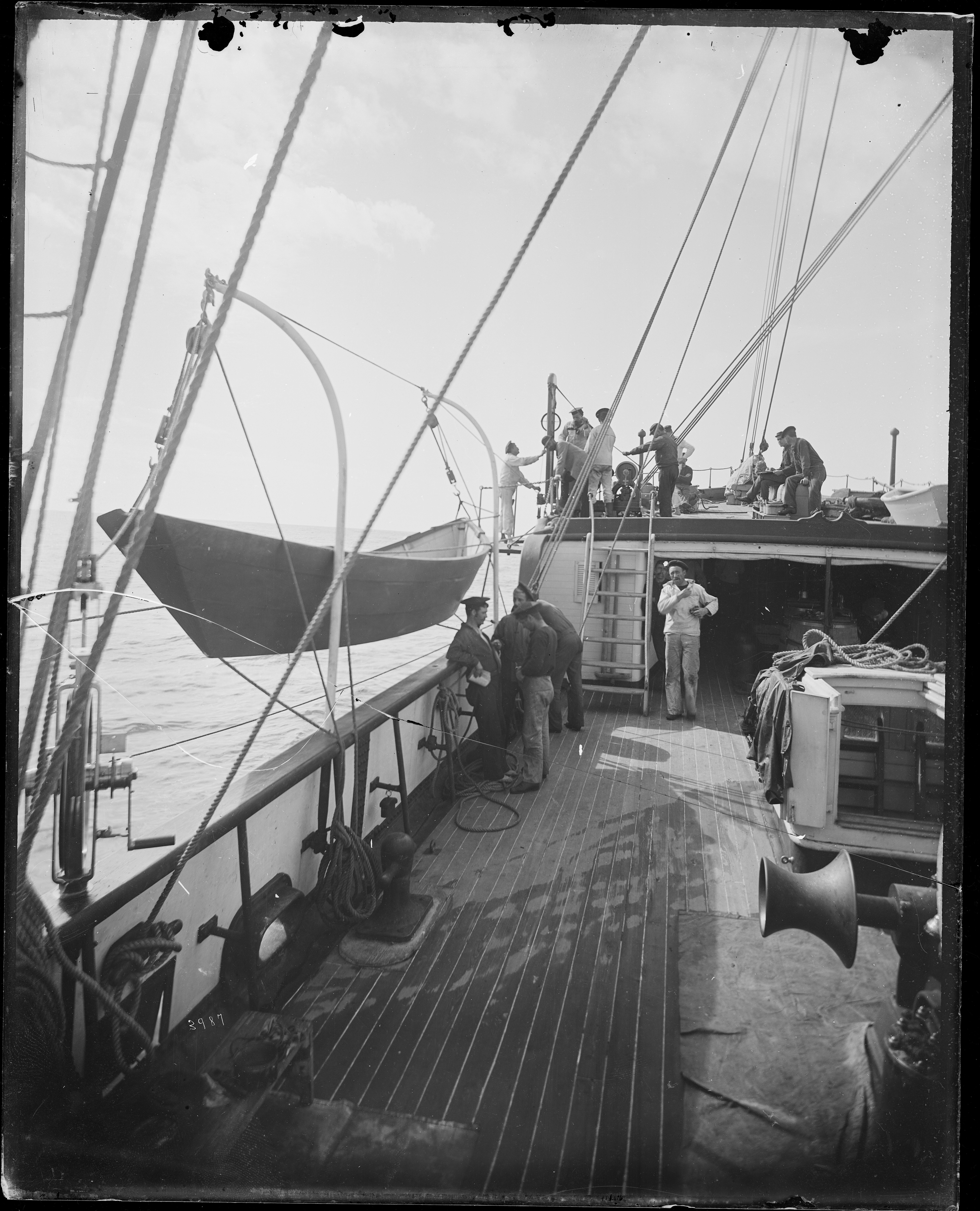
The deck of USFC Albatross, June/July 1885

The ship spent the first half of 1885 making cruises from Washington, to Pensacola, Florida, and New Orleans, Louisiana, to look into the red snapper banks and fisheries of the Gulf. While visiting New Orleans, from 20 February to 1 March 1885, the ship was a major attraction in the Fish Commission exhibit at the World Cotton Centennial then being held in that city. For the latter part of the year, she cruised from Washington to Woods Hole, investigated the Grand Banks, off Newfoundland, and looked into the fishing banks off the Virginia and Delaware capes.

Early in 1886, Albatross proceeded to the Bahamas, on a fishery and hydrographic survey; then spent the latter part of the year examining the cod and halibut banks off the Canadian Maritime provinces and dredging off Woods Hole.

For much of 1887, Albatross lay in port at either Washington or Baltimore, readying herself for a cruise to the Pacific. Only one brief cruise interrupted these preparations. From 5 to 9 April, she steamed to Norfolk, from Washington, to familiarize officers assigned to the steamship SS Thetis, with the dredging equipment that their ship would carry in her voyage to the frigid waters of the North Pacific and Arctic oceans.

In the autumn, Albatross conducted a trial trip to test her newly installed boilers and then carried out sounding and dredging operations along the inner edge of the Gulf Stream.

=== Service in the Pacific ===
Following a month at Woods Hole, Albatross proceeded via Washington, to Norfolk, whence she got underway on 21 November 1887, to begin the long voyage to the Pacific Ocean. Albatross arrived at Punta Arenas, in the Straits of Magellan, on 23 January 1888, and remained at anchor there until 1 February, when she cleared the port to resume her circumnavigation of South America.

During the voyage north, she briefly touched eight islands in the Galapagos group for specimens; this included Wreck Bay, on Chatham Island, now San Cristóbal Island, on 4 April, and Charles Island, now Floreana Island on 8 April.

The ship reached San Francisco, on 11 May 1888, having completed a 15,957 nmi (29,552 km; 18,363 mi) voyage. For much of the remainder of the year, she operated between San Francisco, and the Territory of Alaska, exploring the waters to the south of the Alaska Peninsula, and later, in examining the area off the coasts of Washington and Oregon.

Departing San Francisco on 3 January 1889, Albatross proceeded via San Diego, to the Gulf of California, exploring the waters between Point Concepcion and the U.S.-Mexico border, and subsequently sounding the depths off lower California, and examining the fishery resources in the Gulf of California, and the oyster beds off Guaymas, Mexico. Returning to San Francisco, on 25 April, she later proceeded to Seattle, whence she conducted fishery and hydrographic investigations off the coast of Washington and Oregon, between 6 and 29 June. Between 8 and 28 July, Albatross operated from Tacoma, Washington, with four members of the Senate Committee on Indian Affairs embarked: Senators Henry L. Dawes, Francis B. Stockbridge, Charles F. Manderson, and John P. Jones, as the lawmakers "visited the principal Indian settlements in southeast Alaska, as far north as Sitka and Juneau."

Albatross cleared Port Townsend, Washington, on 1 August 1889, bound for the Bering Sea, but nearly 650 nmi (1,200 km; 750 mi) out, she suffered a breakdown of her port engine, on 7 August, and returned to port on 11 August, for repairs. Upon completion of that work on 22 August, the ship returned to sea and resumed her fishery investigations off the coast of the Pacific Northwest and California. In Portland, Orgegon, during this period, between 28 September and 9 October 1889, Albatross drew between 24,000 and 30,000 visitors during the Northern Pacific Industrial Exposition.

Reaching San Francisco, on 25 October 1889, the ship entered the Mare Island Navy Yard, and began a general overhaul that continued until 5 March 1890. She resumed her active work soon thereafter, carrying out investigations between Point Arena and Point Concepcion, seining and sending ashore collecting parties.

On 5 May 1890, Albatross sailed from San Francisco, to carry out "fishery investigations in Alaskan waters and the Bering Sea...defining the fishing grounds and determining the physical and natural history features" of the region. She remained at that task through mid-September, before she resumed her labors off the coasts of Washington, Oregon, and California.

Continuing to operate out of San Francisco, early the following year, 1891, the ship sailed on 30 January, for Panama, where she embarked the noted zoologist, Alexander Agassiz, for a special expedition authorized by President Benjamin Harrison, to explore the waters off the coast of Mexico, Central America, and the region around the Galápagos Islands. Agassiz disembarked at Guaymas, on 23 April; and Albatross returned to San Francisco, on 5 May. That summer, she left San Francisco, on 16 July 1891, bound for the Pribilof Islands, with Thomas Corwin Mendenhall and Clinton Hart Merriam, members of the Bering Sea Commission, charged with preparing America's case to take before the Tribunal of Arbitration at Paris, embarked. Later, between 27 August and 14 September, Albatross carried out hydrographic work in the Strait of Juan de Fuca.

Over the next few months, Albatross operated out of San Francisco. Placed under the direction of the Secretary of the Navy, she plied the Pacific between the west coast of the United States and the Hawaiian Islands, working towards determining "a practicable route for a telegraphic cable" between San Francisco and Honolulu. During the course of this hydrographic work, which took place between 9 October 1891 and 16 January 1892, Albatross also made a few dredge hauls and took some plankton samples.

Next, temporarily assigned to the Revenue Marine Service under the Secretary of the Treasury, Albatross departed San Francisco on 19 March 1892, bound for Unalaska, the Bering Sea, and the Aleutian Islands, to conduct fur seal investigations and gather "...information on questions at issue between the United States and Great Britain." Among her special passengers on this cruise were a resident naturalist, a fishery expert, a special agent of the United States Treasury, and two seal hunters, one of whom was an "interpreter of Chinook Jargon." In July 1892, however, leaky boilers compelled the ship to transfer the fishery expert, and one seal hunter, to the revenue cutter Thomas Corwin, and the resident naturalist, and the other hunter, to the revenue cutter Rush, to carry out what remained of her assignment as she began her return to San Francisco for repairs. En route, despite being hampered by steaming on one hastily repaired boiler, she brought in a confiscated sailing schooner to Sitka, on 11 August, and while there, steamed out to sea and rescued the drifting whaling bark Lydia.

Following yard work at Mare Island, which lasted into the spring of 1893, Albatross returned to Aleutian waters, and resumed her duties in connection with the Alaskan fur seal and fishery investigations. In addition, she carried out patrols as part of the United States naval force in the Bering Sea. Returning to San Francisco, at the end of September 1893, the ship departed that port on 2 January 1894, and conducted a biological survey of San Diego Bay, before returning to San Francisco, on 30 March.

Albatross sailed from her home port on 14 April, bound for the Pacific northwest, and from 19 April to 5 May, assisted in the investigation of seal and salmon fisheries in the Puget Sound region.

Into the autumn of 1894, the ship alternately patrolled the Bering Sea, and operated in the western Aleutians, as her embarked resident naturalist, fishery expert, and scientific assistant, studied the fishing grounds of that region and the "pelagic habits of the fur seals and their rookeries on the Pribilof Islands." Then, her mission completed, she returned to San Francisco, on 17 October 1894.

Departing San Francisco, on 18 May 1895, Albatross sailed again for the Bering Sea, where over the ensuing months, she helped to enforce "regulations governing vessels employed in fur seal fishery," but operated independently of the Bering Sea fleet. She also kept an eye on the fur seals and fishing grounds, and carried out hydrographic investigations. En route home, Albatross visited New Whatcom, Washington, and was on exhibit at the state fair there, hosting visitors on 18 September 1895, and for days following. She then spent nearly a month investigating the Puget Sound salmon fisheries.

Through the first four months of 1896, Albatross operated locally between San Francisco and San Diego Bay, conducting a physical and natural history survey of the latter, as well as of the Cortez and Tanner banks offshore. From 20 to 26 April, the ship took part in "La Fiesta de Los Angeles." On 17 and 18 May, she took part in the official speed trials of the new battleship Oregon, out of San Francisco. After investigating the oyster grounds of San Francisco Bay, and the suitability of that body of water for oyster cultures, Albatross headed back to the northern Pacific.

For the next six months, the ship ranged from San Francisco to the Pribilof Islands, and from the Sea of Okhotsk and the Kuril Islands, back to San Francisco, via Hawaii. During this cruise, she investigated the condition of the fur seal herds on the islands of the north Pacific and Bering Sea. In addition to carrying members of the United States Fur Seal Commission, whose membership included the commanding officer of the Albatross, Lieutenant Commander Jefferson Franklin Moser, she also transported two members of an independent British Commission, and a photographer to the Pribilofs.

Albatross returned to San Francisco, on 11 December 1896, and after a few weeks of voyage repairs, on 30 December, began a provisional examination of the fishing grounds off the coast of Los Angeles County, Monterey, and in the vicinity of the Farallon Islands, to gather data for consideration in weighing the desirability of extending the limits of the offshore fisheries. Upon finishing this work on 25 April 1897, the ship began upkeep at San Francisco.

Dedicated exclusively to fishery work on her next cruise, the ship stood out of San Francisco, on 8 May, and operated in the waters of Puget Sound, and off Cape Flattery, until heading further north on 29 May. Attempting to locate new halibut banks en route, she systematically studied the "streams of southeast Alaska to determine their resources, and the abundance, movements, and habits of their fishes," before ultimately returning to San Francisco, on 2 November 1897.

A little over a month later, the ship sailed for the Farallons, on 5 December, and the following morning, planted a shipment of eastern lobster and tautog, received by rail from the east coast, in the waters off those islands. After returning to San Francisco, the same day, she operated from that port from 20 December 1897 to 6 April 1898, as she served as a base for a survey of the San Diego County fisheries. On 27 March 1898, her crewmen rescued a man whose rowboat had overturned some 400 yd (1,200 ft) astern of where the ship lay at anchor.

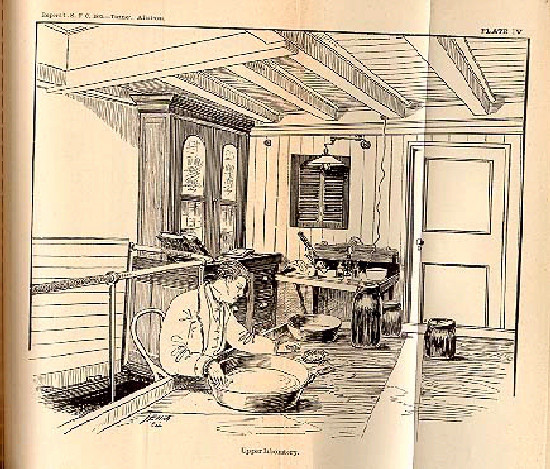
Upper laboratory of Albatross

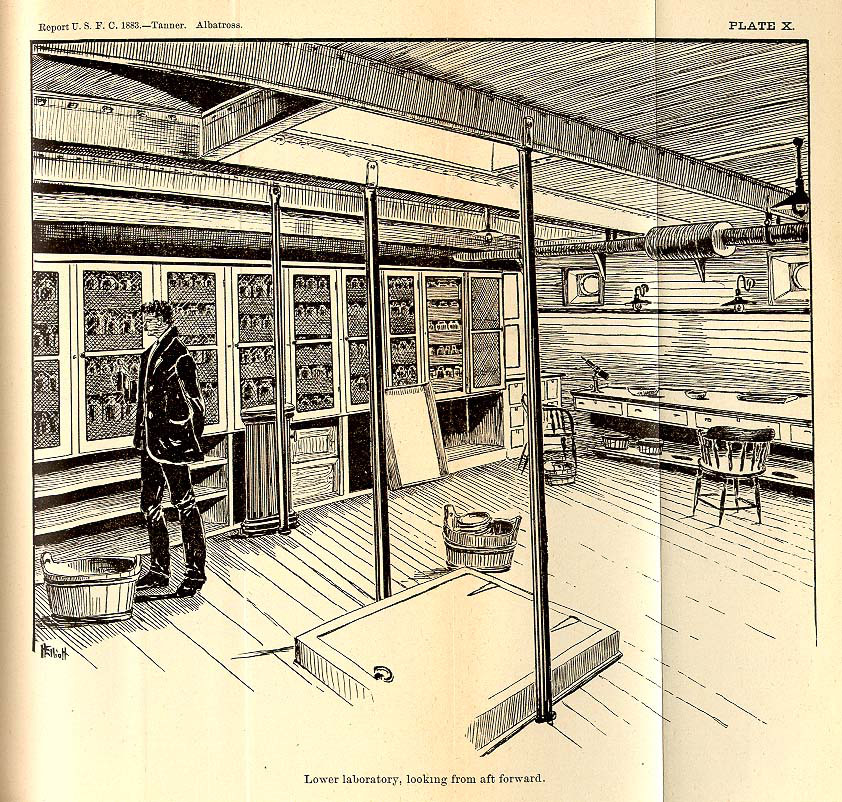
Lower laboratory looking forward from aft

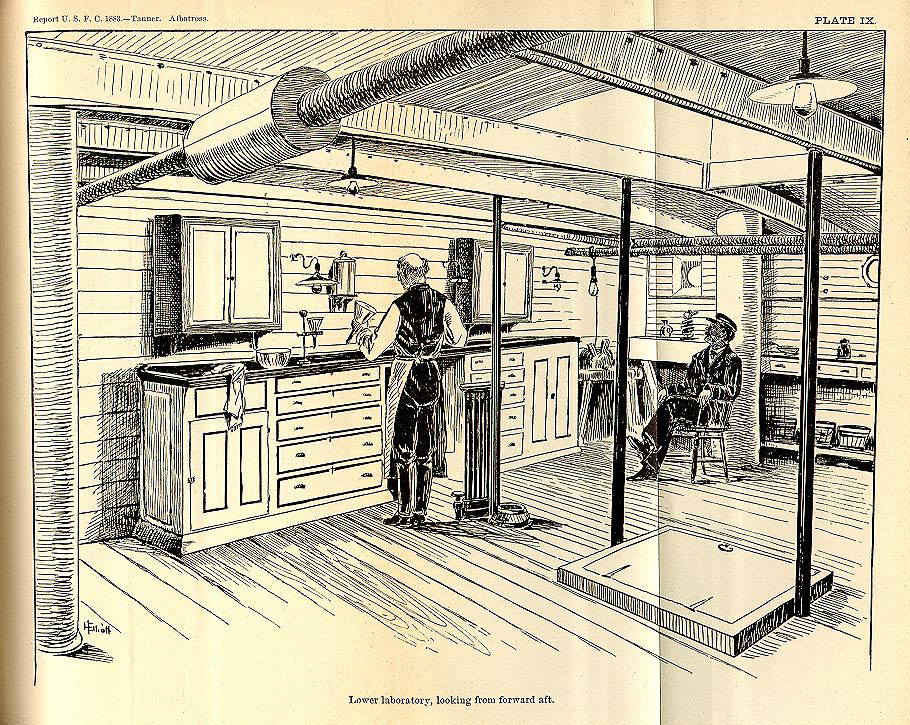
Lower laboratory looking aft from forward

=== Spanish–American War ===
Soon after the United States declared war on Spain, Albatross was turned over to the commandant of the navy yard at the Mare Island Navy Yard, on 21 April 1898, for conversion to an auxiliary cruiser. Her dredging and collecting equipment was landed and stored at the yard, the ship underwent conversion at Union Iron Works, San Francisco, over the next few months. During this alteration, her pilot house was raised to permit construction of two additional staterooms beneath it, she received a new upper bridge, and her coal bunkers were enlarged to increase her steaming radius. In addition, the ship received a battery of two 20-pounders, two 37-millimeter guns, one 53-millimeter gun, and two Gatling guns. On 11 August, the auxiliary cruiser sailed for Acapulco, Mexico, as Spanish resistance on the war's last front was collapsing. On the night of 12–13 August 1898, news was received of the signing of the peace protocol. Albatross returned to the Mare Island Navy Yard, on 8 September, and landed her guns a week later. She was then returned to the United States Fish Commission under the terms of a Presidential order, dated 25 August 1898.

=== Return to scientific study ===
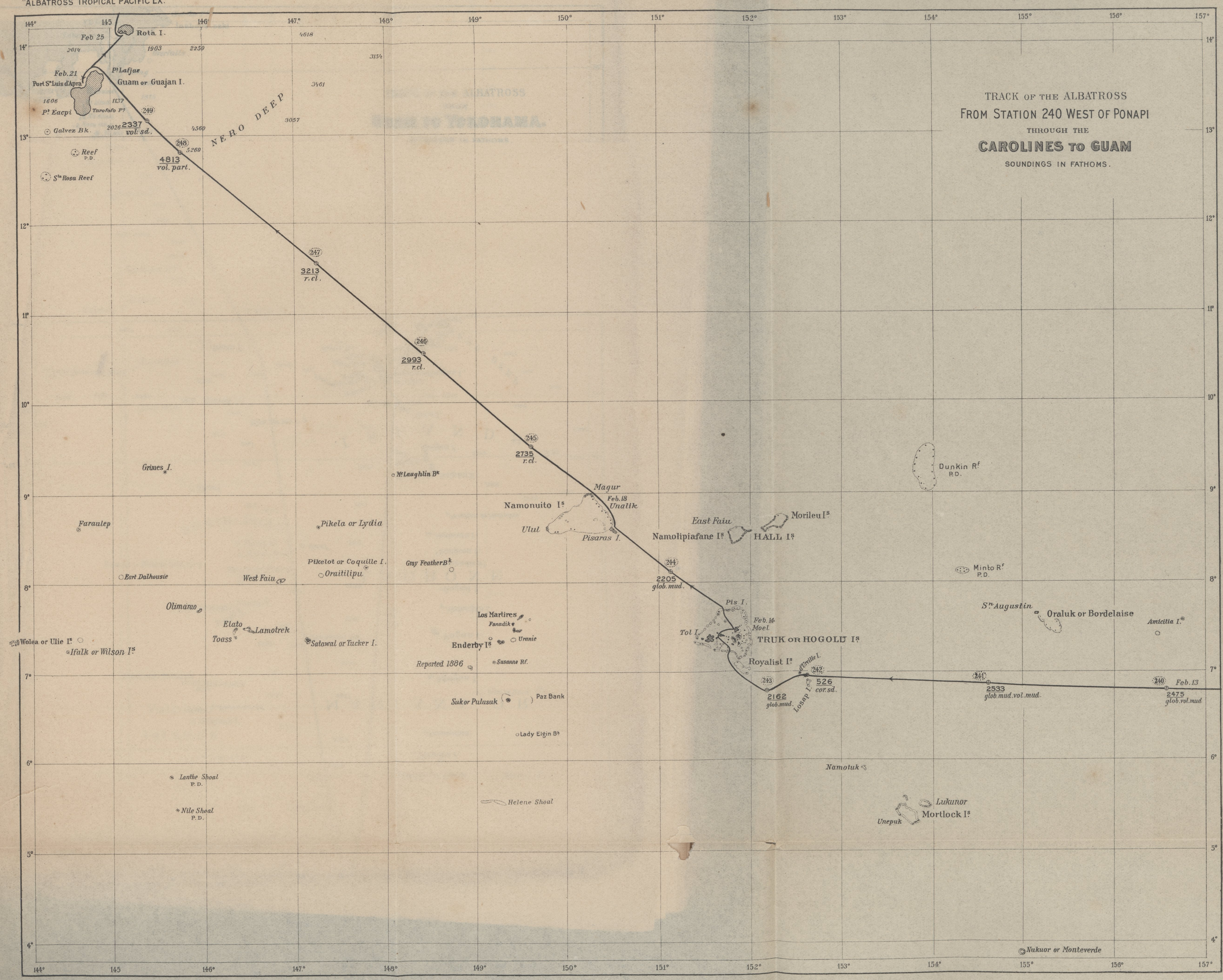
Track of Albatross from Pohnpei, through the Caroline Islands, to Guam, in February 1900

Following repairs and alterations, Albatross sailed from San Francisco, on 23 August 1899, bound by a most circuitous route for the Far East. Over the next few months, again with Alexander Agassiz embarked, she ranged into the South and Central Pacific, visiting the Marquesas, Paumotu, Society Islands, Cook Islands, Tonga, Fiji, Ellice, Gilbert, Marshall Islands, Caroline Islands, and the Mariana Islands. During the course of this cruise over a vast ocean basin, which Agassiz named "Moser Deep", in honor of Albatross' captain, her distinguished passenger made thousands of dredgings, and soundings of the sea yielded siliceous sponges from 4,173 fathoms (25,038 ft; 7,632 m).

During this voyage Harry Clifford Fassett, captain's clerk and photographer, recorded people, communities and scenes during this voyage using a glass-plate camera.

After disembarking Agassiz, upon arrival at Yokohama, Japan, on 4 March 1900, Albatross operated out of that port into June. During this period, from 4 to 8 May, she conducted several short dredging trips for the benefit of a party of students from the Tokyo Imperial University. Ultimately departing Yokohama, on 2 June, the ship visited Hakodate, Japan, and Kamchatka, Russia, north of the Aleutian Islands, and collected biological specimens in the North Pacific. That summer, she ranged into the Bering Sea, and ultimately returned to San Francisco, on 30 October 1900, after a cruise of 14 months.

The following year, 1901, Albatross continued her work in the salmon fisheries of southeast Alaskan waters, departing San Francisco, for that region, on 23 April. During her homeward voyage, in September and October, she investigated the waters off the Pacific Northwest and California, to determine their suitability for the introduction of eastern lobsters and crab, and to study the movements of salmon at sea.

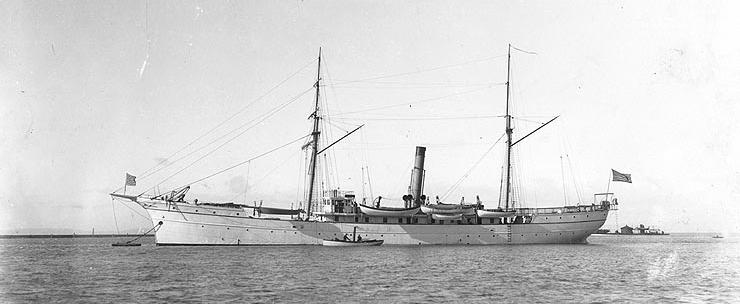
Albatross, in San Francisco Bay, c. 1902, Camanche visible in the background

On 11 March 1902, the ship sailed for Hawaii, and over the ensuing months, investigated the fish and other aquatic resources of the Hawaiian Islands, ultimately returning to San Francisco, on 1 September. The following spring, the ship embarked members of the special commission appointed by President Theodore Roosevelt, to investigate the conditions and needs of the Alaskan salmon fisheries, with an eye towards conserving this important resource, and transported them to the waters of the Pacific northwest and Alaska. During the course of the cruise, Albatross enabled the members of the commission to visit "numerous salmon streams, canneries, and satleries" in Alaska. She returned to her home port, on 24 September 1903.

Early in 1904, Albatross operated locally between San Francisco and San Diego, working jointly with Stanford University and the University of California, in a study of the marine biology and fishery resources, in the waters of Monterey Bay and south of Point Conception. The ship did not conduct another expedition until the autumn of 1904, when she sailed from San Francisco, on 6 October, for Panama.

With Professor Agassiz again embarked, Albatross cruised the tropical waters of the eastern Pacific, visiting the Galapagos Islands; Callao, Peru; the Easter and Gambier Islands, before she disembarked the distinguished zoologist, on 24 February 1905, at Acapulco. Albatross then returned to San Francisco, arriving on 5 April 1905. During this voyage, Agassiz had used Albatross as the base for his study of the Humboldt Current, the most extensive explorations made in those waters up to that time.

Later that spring, the ship left San Francisco, on 18 May, bound for Alaskan waters, and over the next several months installed a salmon hatchery at Yes Bay, and later carried out several plankton tows in the waters between Puget Sound and Wrangell Island. She returned to San Francisco, on 16 November 1905.

As the ship was preparing for her next cruise, a violent earthquake shook San Francisco, on 18 April 1906, and a disastrous fire ensued. Albatross assisted greatly in the relief efforts. Underway, on 3 May, the ship sailed for the familiar climes of the Aleutians, and during the cruise, ranged as far as the Commander Islands and the Sea of Okhotsk, and even visited the coasts of Japan and Korea. She investigated the salmon fisheries, the distribution of the various types of fish which inhabited the waters she traversed, and conducted scientific explorations of the northern Pacific Ocean. Tragically, on the return leg of the voyage, her captain was washed overboard in rough seas, on 21 November 1906. The ship ultimately reached San Francisco, on 10 December 1906.

Following upkeep and voyage repairs, the ship left San Francisco, on 16 October 1907, beginning what became her longest cruise. Steaming by way of Hawaii, Midway, and Guam, the ship proceeded to the Philippine Islands, and over the next two and a half years, surveyed the fisheries and aquatic resources of the Philippines and neighboring regions, before returning home on 4 May 1910.

That summer, Albatross returned to the waters off Alaska, and the Pribilof Islands, on an inspection tour of various "government activities in which the Department of Commerce and Labor", harbored an interest. After returning to San Francisco, on 20 September 1910, she cruised to the Gulf of California, and back, between 23 February and 28 April 1911, to carry out a scientific expedition to Lower California and adjacent islands, in cooperation with the American Museum of Natural History. The ship left San Francisco, on 17 May 1911, and proceeded to Alaskan waters, to examine the existing halibut and cod fishing grounds, and to search for new ones. She operated off the territory's southeast coast and in the Gulf of Alaska, before returning home on 2 September 1911.

=== Changed to schooner ===
Found unseaworthy upon her return to San Francisco, Albatross' sphere of operations was limited to the San Francisco Bay, and during 1912, 1913 and 1914, the ship carried out a biological survey of that body of water. Late in this period, during the fiscal year 1913, Albatross underwent a major refit at Mare Island Navy Yard, that altered her rigging from brigantine to schooner, and enlarged her deckhouse, as the pilot house was extended to provide two offices and a new stateroom, for the executive officer. In addition, a radio "shack" was built forward of the mainmast.

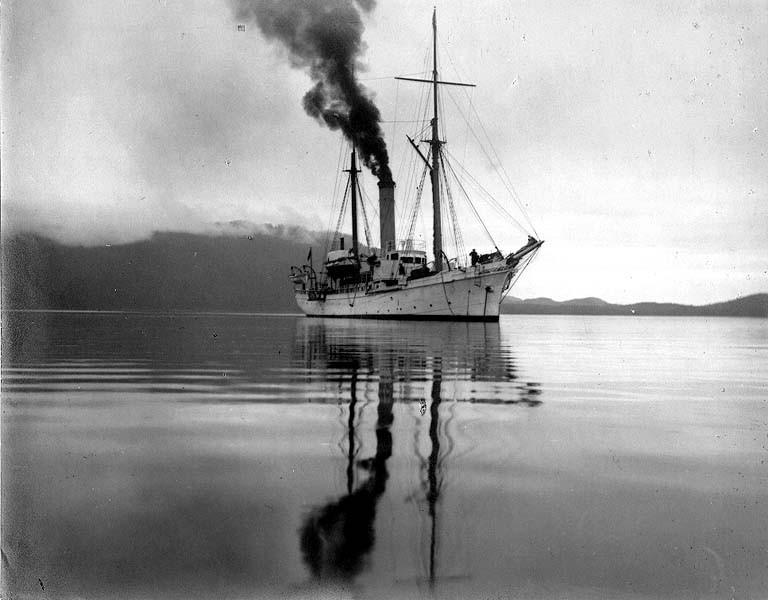
Power schooner Albatross in Alaskan waters, undated photo by John Nathan Cobb

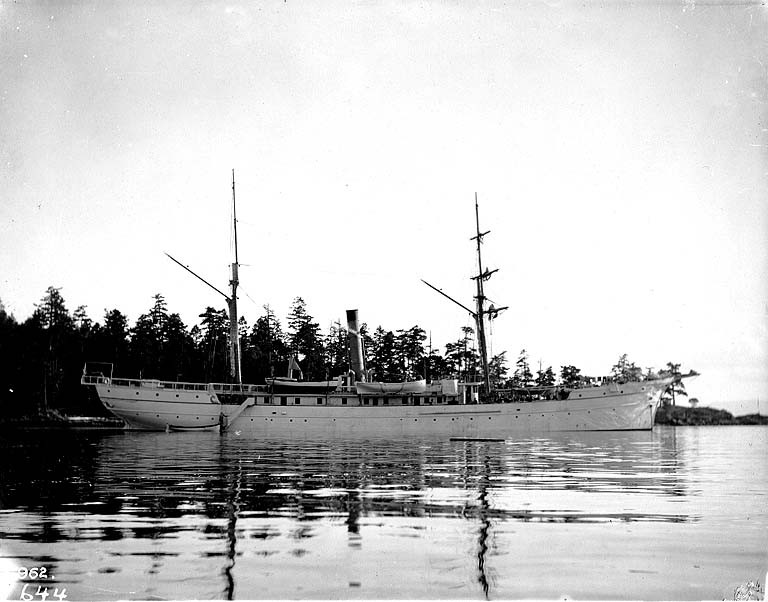
Schooner Albatross at anchor in Alaska

Albatross subsequently departed San Francisco, on 12 April 1914, and set course for the coasts of Washington and Oregon, but interrupted her survey of the fishing grounds off the coasts of Washington and Oregon, to take the Deputy Commissioner of Fisheries to the Pribilofs, on an inspection trip of the fisheries of central and western Alaska, that lasted from 12 June to 22 August. Returning to San Francisco, on 15 September 1914, she resumed her work off the Oregon and Washington coasts, the following summer, clearing her home port on 6 July 1915. Over the ensuing months, she resurveyed the grounds she had studied during her cruises in 1888 and 1889. From the spring of 1916, into the autumn of that year, Albatross operated in the waters off southern and Lower California, to learn of the "distribution and migration of tuna."

=== World War I ===
Insufficient funds to operate the vessel dictated that she be laid up and she remained inactive from October 1916 to April 1917. She was transferred to the Navy for war service, on 2 May 1917, within a month of the United States' declaration of war against the Central Powers.

Taken over by the Commandant of the 12th Naval District, on 19 November 1917, Albatross was placed under the command of Lieutenant Commander John J. Hannigan. Following repairs and alterations at Mare Island Navy Yard, Albatross, her armament consisting of four 6-pounders and a Colt automatic gun, departed San Francisco, on 14 January 1918, and reached Key West, Florida, on 14 February. Assigned to the American Patrol Detachment, the gunboat protected tankers, transporting important oil and petroleum cargo, in the Gulf of Mexico and Caribbean. While working with the American Patrol Department, she took part in the search for the Navy collier Cyclops, which after departing Barbados, on 4 March 1918, had disappeared without trace in the spring of 1918.

On 21 November 1918, 10 days after the armistice stilled the guns of World War I, the Chief of Naval Operations directed that Albatross, upon the completion of repairs at New Orleans, be released from duty with the American Patrol Detachment. Reaching Norfolk, on 30 May 1919, the ship was turned over to the Bureau of Fisheries, on 23 June 1919.

=== Return to research ===
The following autumn, Albatross resumed her scientific work, cruising from Norfolk, to the Gulf of Mexico, and Havana, Cuba, conducting hydrographic investigations of the Gulf Stream, between 30 October and 15 December 1919. The following year, Albatross departed Baltimore, on 16 February 1920, and proceeded to the waters off New England. She then operated out of Boston, into the spring, carrying out hydrographic work in the Gulf of Maine. She returned to Baltimore, on 30 May.

== Fate ==
Albatross was decommissioned at Woods Hole, on the morning of 29 October 1921. Minus her equipment, instruments, and library, she was sold on 16 June 1924, to Thomas Butler and Company, of Boston, who then refitted her "as closely possible along her old lines" as a school ship. In 1927, her owner was listed as James A. Ross, and she was registered in Boston. Fitted out as a training ship for "nautical students or cadets", she left Boston, on 12 July 1927, under the auspices of the American Nautical School, Inc., with 119 pupils on board, bound for European waters. The students, however, departed the ship at a succession of ports on the ship's final voyage, Cork, Le Havre, and Amsterdam, with the result that only 21 remained on board when she arrived at Hamburg. The ship's crew insisted that she be auctioned off to satisfy their demand for wages. On 18 October of the same year, the ship was reportedly tied up at Hamburg, "under attachment for indebtedness." She was sold at auction in Hamburg for $10,800, but her ultimate fate remains unknown.

== Scientific and historical significance ==
Albatross and the smaller Fish Hawk, were credited with being the first large ships built specifically for marine research. A Smithsonian tribute notes: "The Albatross, designed to go anywhere in the world and work in the greatest depths, contributed more to our knowledge of marine fishes than any other ship" noting that "the number of scientific papers based on the ship's work has never been counted but it runs into many hundreds".

== See also ==
- European and American voyages of scientific exploration

== Bibliography ==
- Department of Paleobiology (3 December 2010). "Catalog Number - USNM SD 59154.0000". Smithsonian, National Museum of Natural History. Smithsonian Institution. Archived from the original on 20 July 2011.
- "Albatross II (Masted Screw Steamer)". Dictionary of American Naval Fighting Ships. Navy Department, Naval History and Heritage Command. 12 June 2015.
- Lloyd's Register of Shipping. Vol. II.–Steamers and Motorships. London: Lloyd's Register of Shipping. 1927. ALB – via Internet Archive.
- Radigan, Joseph M. "Albatross".
- Larson, Edward J (2001). Evolution's Workshop: God and Science on the Galápagos Islands. New York, NY: Basic Books. p. 108. ISBN 0-465-03810-7. "The Albatross stayed in the archipelago for less than two weeks in 1888, but managed to stop at eight different islands. The ship's naturalists and crew gathered specimens at each anchorage, concentrating on birds, reptiles, and fish. The landfalls included the abandoned settlement on Charles Island, where the ship's captain report "great numbers of cattle, horses, mules, donkeys, sheep and hots were running wild" where native species once flourished, and a new sugarcane plantation and cattle ranch on Chatham Island that also encroached on wild habitat."
- Moring, John R. "Cruises of the "Albatross" off San Diego and Other Parts of Southern California, 1889-1916". Smithsonian Institution Archives.
- Landwehr, Sharon, Harold Clifford Fassett (1870-1953) (PDF), California Academy of Sciences
- "Records of the United States Fish And Wildlife Service [USFWS]". National Archives. The US National Archives and Records Administration. 15 August 2016.
- "Schoolship Sold At Auction In Germany". Boston Herald. 8 March 1929. p. 19.
- "Spencer Baird and Ichthyology at the Smithsonian: U.S. FISH COMMISSION". Smithsonian, National Museum of Natural History. Smithsonian Institution.
