= 539 Pamina =

Main-belt asteroid

Discovery
- Discovered by: Max Wolf
- Discovery site: Heidelberg
- Discovery date: 2 August 1904

Designations
- Pronunciation: German: [paːmiːnaː]
- Alternative designations: 1904 OL

Orbital characteristics
- Epoch 31 July 2016 (JD 2457600.5)
- Uncertainty parameter 0
- Observation arc: 111.70 yr (40800 d)
- Aphelion: 3.3207 AU (496.77 Gm)
- Perihelion: 2.1569 AU (322.67 Gm)
- Semi-major axis: 2.7388 AU (409.72 Gm)
- Eccentricity: 0.21246
- Orbital period (sidereal): 4.53 yr (1,655.6 d) 4.53 yr (1655.6 d)
- Mean anomaly: 216.44°
- Mean motion: 0° 13^{m} 2.82^{s} / day
- Inclination: 6.7963°
- Longitude of ascending node: 274.312°
- Argument of perihelion: 97.453°

Physical characteristics
- Mean radius: 26.985±1.7 km
- Synodic rotation period: 13.903 h (0.5793 d)
- Geometric albedo: 0.0800±0.011
- Spectral type: Ch
- Absolute magnitude (H): 10.1

539 Pamina is a minor planet orbiting the Sun in the main belt. It is named for the heroine of Mozart's opera, The Magic Flute. This asteroid was discovered by M. Wolf in 1904 at the Heidelberg observatory in Germany. It is orbiting at a distance of 2.74 AU from the Sun, with an orbital eccentricity (ovalness) of 0.212 and a period of 4.53 yr. The orbital plane is inclined at an angle of 6.8° to the ecliptic.

Photometric observations of this asteroid taken in 2004 provided a light curve showing a rotation period of 13.903±0.001 h with a brightness amplitude of 0.10±0.01 in magnitude. Infrared measurements give a diameter estimate of 54±3 km.
