= Zera Luther Tanner =

American naval officer, inventor and oceanographer(1835–1906)

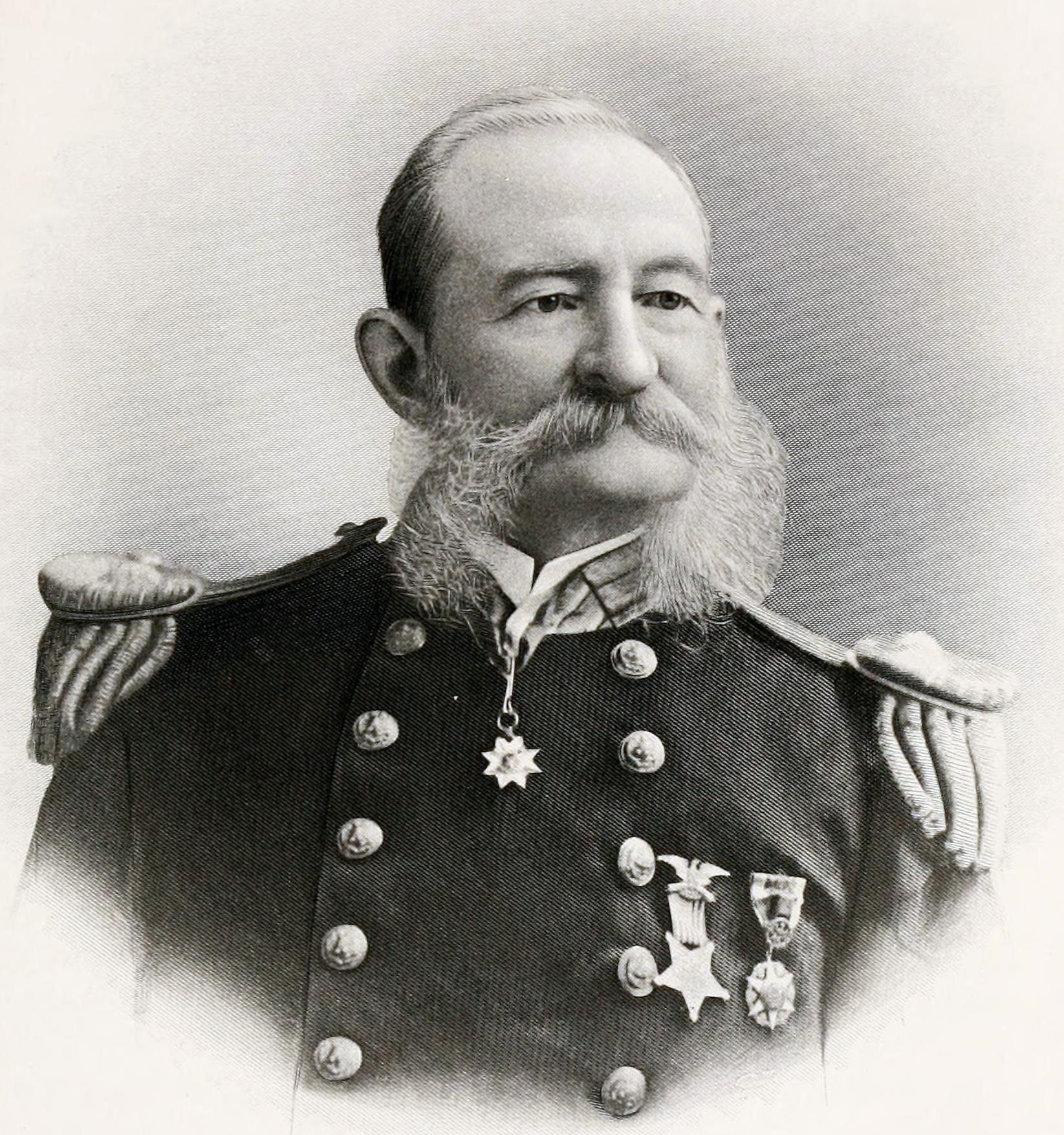
- Captain Zera L. Tanner
- Born: December 5, 1835; Warsaw, New York
- Died: December 16, 1906 (aged 71) Washington, D.C.
- Buried: Arlington National Cemetery
- Allegiance: United States
- Branch: United States Navy
- Service years: 1868–1897
- Rank: Commander
- Commands: USFC Fish Hawk; USFC Albatross
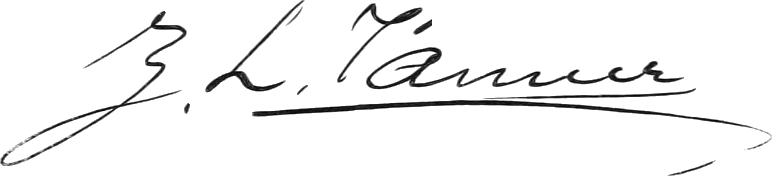
- Signature

Zera Luther Tanner (December 5, 1835 – December 16, 1906), sometimes spelled Zero, was an American naval officer, inventor, and oceanographer. Tanner invented a depth sounding system, wrote several books on hydrography and retired as a commander of the United States Navy in 1897.

== Career ==
Zera Luther Tanner was born in Warsaw, New York, in 1835, the son of Zerah and Ruth (Foster) Tanner. The elder Tanner died when his son was one year old, so the younger Tanner worked in family farms until his late teens, when he apprenticed to a mechanic. Tanner traveled by ship to Great Britain in 1855, and because of ill health chose to take a longer voyage from Liverpool to Bombay, India aboard SS Culloden in 1856. After two round trips, one as third officer, Tanner chose sailing for his profession.

Returning to the United States, after Tanner served aboard American merchantmen, he eventually assisted several seaborne troop movements in the Gulf of Mexico.

=== Civil War service ===
Tanner chose to join government service and was appointed acting ensign of the Union Navy in the summer of 1862. Tanner served upon the bark USS Midnight and the supply steamer USS Rhode Island during the American Civil War. When Rhode Island captured a British blockade runner in December 1864, Tanner was put in charge of the prize crew. During the Second Battle of Fort Fisher in 1865, Tanner commanded the boats from his vessel landing Union ground forces.

=== Post war service ===
Tanner entered the United States Navy in 1868, coming over from the deactivated volunteer services. Until his retirement in 1897, Tanner served the navy in hydrographic survey and dredging commands, often in conjunction with the United States Commission of Fish and Fisheries, generally known as the United States Fish Commission.

Tanner partially designed and oversaw the construction of two ships for the commission. USFC Fish Hawk, in service from 1880 to 1926 and the first large vessel ever built expressly for the promotion of fisheries, was a smaller vessel designed for coastal waters and was primarily used as a mobile fish hatchery although she also conducted fisheries research, while USFC Albatross, which served as a fisheries research ship from 1882 to 1921 except for brief periods in U.S. Navy service in 1898 and from 1917 to 1919, was the first full-sized vessel primarily designed for marine research.

Tanner was the first commanding officer of Fish Hawk, from November 10, 1882, to May 21, 1885. He commanded Albatross for nine years, including transporting famed naturalist Alexander Emanuel Agassiz on an 1891 voyage to the Galapagos Islands.

Tanner was promoted to commander in 1893 and was relieved of command of Albatross on May 1, 1894. After an extended furlough, was assigned to duty with the Fish Commission on January 1, 1895. He retired from the Navy on December 5, 1897, having reached the mandatory retirement age of 62.

== Death and legacy ==
Tanner died in Washington, D.C. on December 16, 1906, aged 71, and was buried with military honors at Arlington National Cemetery.

Tanner was a Companion of the Military Order of the Loyal Legion of the United States. He was also a member of the Grand Army of the Republic.

== Legacy ==
Tanner developed an improved method of depth sounding, using instruments of his own design. He patented his system in 1899 as the Tanner navigational sounding apparatus.

Two U.S. Navy ships have been named after Tanner. After World War II, USS Pamina (AKA-34), an attack cargo ship with service in the Okinawa campaign was re-purposed for oceanographic survey work and renamed USS Tanner (AGS-15). Tanner spent her career mapping significant coastline areas and was retired in 1969. In 1990, USNS Tanner (T-AGS-40) was built for the U.S. Navy as a fast oceanographic research vessel. Now named TS State of Maine, she serves as the training ship of the Maine Maritime Academy.

Before 1902

== Selected works ==
- Deep-sea exploration: a general description of the steamer Albatross, her appliances and methods

== Date of rank ==
- Acting ensign – August 18, 1862
- Acting master – September 29, 1864
- Ensign – March 12, 1868
- Master – December 18, 1868
- Lieutenant – March 21, 1870
- Lieutenant commander – February 22, 1883
- Commander – February 7, 1893
- Retired list – December 5, 1897
