= USFC Fish Hawk =

U.S. fisheries research and hatchery ship

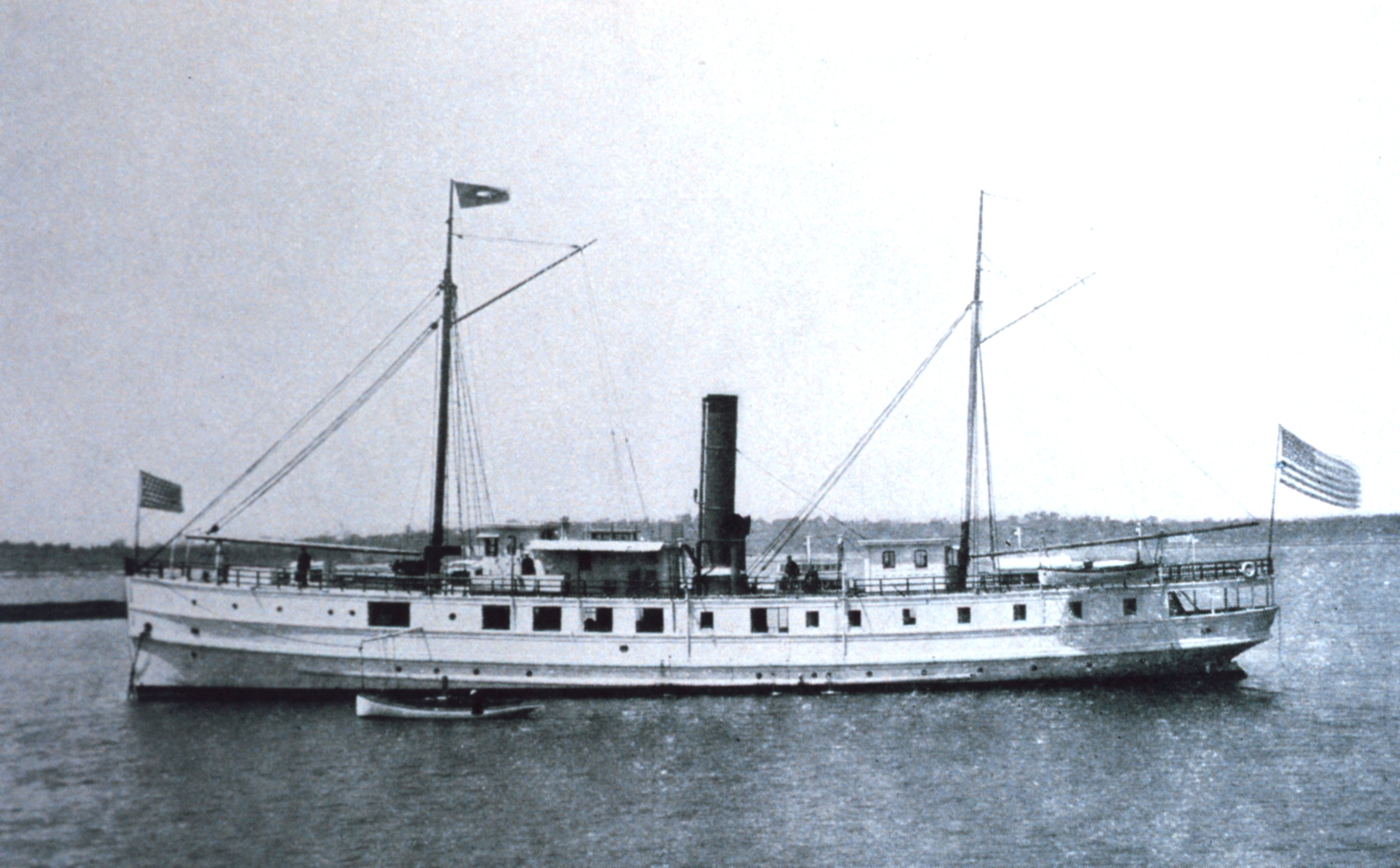
- Fish Hawk ca. 1900

History

U.S. Fish Commission
- Name: USFC Fish Hawk
- Namesake: Fish hawk, an alternative name for the osprey, a diurnal, piscivorous bird of prey
- Builder: Pusey and Jones Company, Wilmington, Delaware
- Cost: US$45,000 (appropriated)
- Launched: 13 December 1879
- Completed: 23 February 1880
- Commissioned: Spring 1880
- Home port: Woods Hole, Massachusetts
- Identification: 1880–1900: GVQC; 1900–1926: GVQC
- Fate: Transferred to U.S. Navy 4 May 1898
- Acquired: Transferred from U.S. Navy 15 September 1898
- Fate: To U.S. Bureau of Fisheries 1903

United States
- Name: USFS Fish Hawk
- Namesake: Previous name retained
- Acquired: From U.S. Fish Commission 1903
- Home port: Woods Hole, Massachusetts
- Fate: Transferred to U.S. Navy July 1898
- Acquired: From U.S. Navy 1 July 1919
- Decommissioned: January 1926

United States Navy
- Name: USS Fish Hawk
- Namesake: Previous name retained
- Acquired: From U.S. Fish Commission 4 May 1898
- Commissioned: 4 May 1898
- Decommissioned: 15 September 1898
- Fate: Transferred to U.S. Fish Commission 15 September 1898
- Acquired: From U.S. Bureau of Fisheries July 1918
- Fate: Transferred to U.S. Bureau of Fisheries 1 July 1919

General characteristics (as built)
- Type: Floating fish hatchery and fisheries research ship
- Tonnage: 441.40 GRT (1883); 205.1 NRT (1883)
- Displacement: 484 tons
- Length: 156 ft 6 in (47.7 m) (overall); 146 ft 6 in (44.7 m) (between perpendiculars)
- Beam: 27 ft (8.2 m)
- Depth of hold: 10 ft 9 in (3.3 m) (amidships)
- Propulsion: Steam, coal-fired, two screws
- Sail plan: Fore-and-aft two-masted schooner rig
- Crew: 84, plus up to 25 additional personnel on temporary assignment

General characteristics (as U.S. Navy vessel)
- Type: Armed steamer
- Length: 156 ft 7 in (47.7 m)
- Beam: 27 ft (8.2 m)
- Propulsion: Steam, coal-fired, two screws
- Sail plan: Fore-and-aft two-masted schooner rig
- Speed: 9 knots (17 km/h; 10 mph)
- Crew: 45
- Armament: 6 x 1-pounder guns

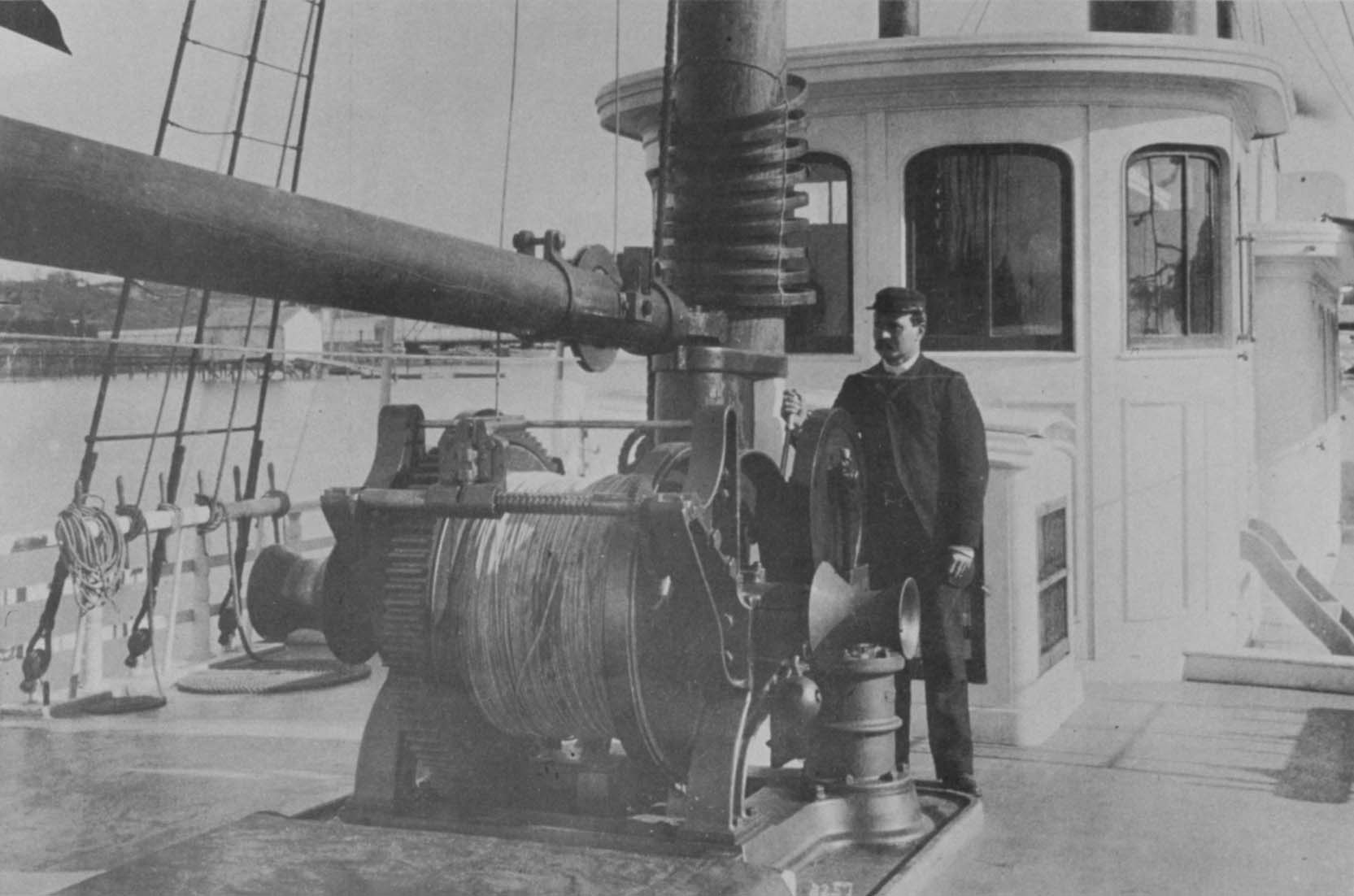
A pilot at the wheel of USFC Fish Hawk

USFC Fish Hawk was a fisheries science research ship operated by the United States Commission of Fish and Fisheries, commonly called the United States Fish Commission, from 1880 to 1903 and as USFS Fish Hawk by its successor, the United States Bureau of Fisheries, from 1903 1918 and from 1919 to 1926. She was the first large ship purpose-built by any country for the promotion of fisheries, and spent her 46-year career operating along the United States East Coast, in the Gulf of Mexico, and off Puerto Rico.

In addition to her fisheries service, Fish Hawk served in the United States Navy as USS Fish Hawk in 1898 during the Spanish–American War and from 1918 to 1919 during and in the immediate aftermath of World War I.

== Design and construction ==
From its foundation in 1871, the U.S. Commission of Fish and Fisheries, more generally known as the U.S. Fish Commission, recognized a need for ships to operate along the coast of the United States to engage in exploration, conduct surveys, and perform scientific research on marine resources. In addition, fisheries scientists of the time believed that successful spawning was the most significant factor in the productivity of fisheries; the spawning of American shad at the time was the most important fishery in the United States, and because shad runs lasted only a month in any given location, a floating fish hatchery that could move along the coast was deemed more cost-effective than constructing shad hatcheries along the entire U.S. East Coast.

The United States Department of the Navy loaned the Fish Commission a small steam launch to conduct its field work during the summer of 1871. The Commission had no ship in 1872, but during each summer from 1873 through 1875 the Navy Department loaned it the 100-ton steamer Blue Light. The Commission again had no ship in 1876, but the Navy Department loaned it the 306-ton steamer Speedwell during the summers of 1877, 1878, and 1879. These vessels were only minimally modified for fisheries research work, with only primitive equipment installed. The Fish Commission clearly required a vessel designed specifically for service as a floating hatchery and fisheries research ship, and so in 1879 the United States Congress appropriated $45,000 (USD) for the construction of a fisheries research steamer to be named Fish Hawk.

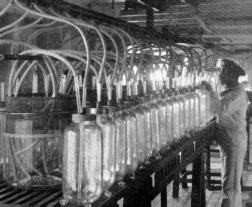
A laboratory below deck aboard USFC Fish Hawk

The Fish Commission chose a design by C. W. Copeland of the United States Lighthouse Board, and the Pusey and Jones Company built the ship at Wilmington, Delaware. Fish Hawk had a fore-and-aft two-masted schooner rig, coal-fired steam propulsion, and twin screws, and was intended for coastal work rather than oceanic research. She had an iron hull sheathed with about three inches (7.6 cm) of yellow pine, caulked and coppered. Her hull was divided by five iron bulkheads, four of them watertight. Above the main deck she was of wooden construction. The pilot house, captain's quarters, and a laboratory were on a promenade deck extending along the entire length and across the entire width of the ship. For propulsion, she had two inverted-cylinder surface-condensing steam engines, each driving one of her two screws, and a coal-fired overhead, return-flue boiler. She had a fore-and-aft schooner rig and three sails, a fore staysail, a foresail, and a mainsail.

Fish Hawk's main deck was filled with hatching equipment to allow her to serve as a floating hatchery for American shad, striped bass, mackerel, and herring. A pump supplying 10,000 US gallons (38,000 L) of water per hour and two 500-US-gallon (1,900 L) distribution tanks fed the equipment. Fertilized fish eggs were placed in 36 hatching cones, each capable of hatching 200,000 American shad eggs, and feed valves regulated the current through the cones to keep the eggs gently in motion so they would not mat or settle to the bottom. Fish Hawk also had 18 hatching cylinders – each capable of holding 250,000 eggs – with wire gauze bottoms; the cylinders were suspended from beams hanging over the sides of the ship and partially submerged, with nine on each side. Cam machinery caused the cylinders to rise gently and drop more rapidly for about eight inches (20 cm), which made the eggs circulate freely without settling on the bottom.

Fish Hawk also was outfitted to conduct general scientific research related to fisheries, including depth sounding, measuring the temperature of the sea bottom, and collecting marine animals and plants. She had a hoisting winch with 1,000 fathoms (6,000 ft; 1,800 m) of steel cable for trawling and dredging, an otter trawl, a 9-foot (2.7 m) beam trawl, an 11-foot (3.4 m) beam trawl, a 17-foot (5.2 m) beam trawl, Blake and Chester rake dredges, and a tangle bar, the latter an iron axle and wheels with deck swabs or bundles of rope yarn on chains that Fish Hawk could drag along the sea bottom to capture marine animals and plants. For hydrography, she had a sounding machine with 600 fathoms (3,600 ft; 1,100 m) of piano wire, deep-sea reversing thermometers, and density salinometers.

Fish Hawk carried a number of boats: a 24-foot (7.3 m) steam cutter, a 24-foot-6-inch (7.5 m) ten-oared cutter, a 24-foot-5-inch (7.4 m) gig, a 17-foot-6-inch (5.3 m) dinghy, and several 18-foot (5.5 m) flat-bottomed boats, the latter for use in spawn-taking. She had a crew of 84 and berthing for another 25 people on temporary assignment to the ship, such as scientists, technicians, or passengers aboard as observers.

The Fish Commission detailed United States Navy Lieutenant Zera Luther Tanner to oversee the construction of Fish Hawk. She was launched on 13 December 1879. On sea trials on 19 February 1880, she averaged 9.15 knots (16.95 km/h; 10.53 mph) during a six-hour run of 54.9 nautical miles (101.7 km; 63.2 mi). She was completed on 23 February 1880, when the Fish Commission took delivery of her, but the Commission then had to await a 2 June 1880 appropriation of funds to begin to purchase her outfit (anchors, boats, signal flags, chronometer, nautical charts, nautical instruments, and so forth) and construct and install her hatching equipment; Pusey and Jones also built the hatching equipment, but under a separate contract from the one for Fish Hawk's construction. In the meantime, Tanner became her first commanding officer on 12 March 1880, and she was commissioned that spring. Procuring Fish Hawk's outfit and constructing and installing her hatching equipment took most of June and July 1880.

The first large ship purpose-built by any country for the promotion of fisheries, Fish Hawk greatly impressed foreign observers at the time of her completion. After viewing a model of Fish Hawk at the American exhibit at the International Fisheries Exhibition in Berlin in 1880, the director of the German Empire′s hatching establishment at Hüningen wrote, "Lost in astonishment, we stand before the large model of the Fish Hawk, a large steamship specially constructed by the American Government for purposes of pisciculture."

== Service history ==
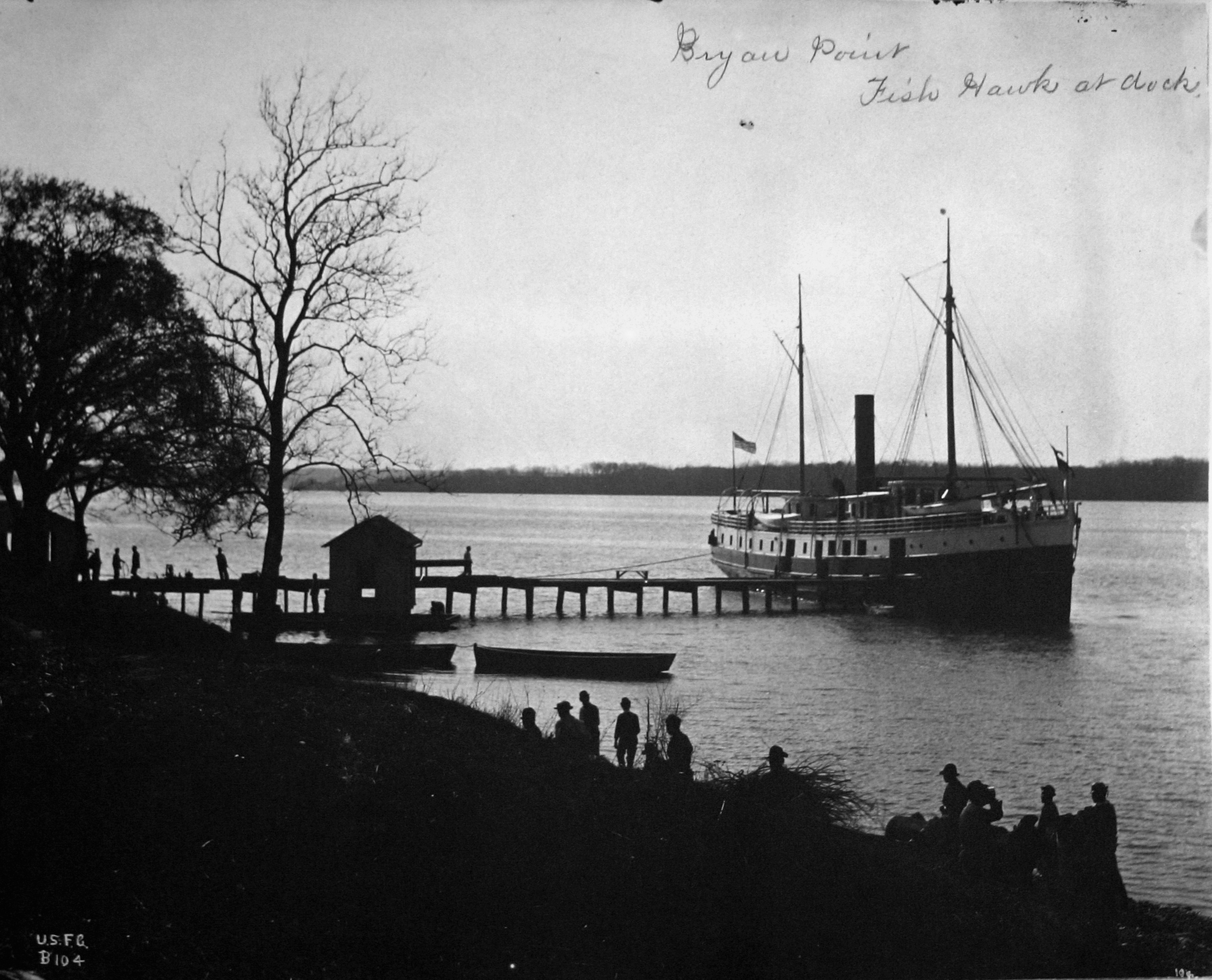
USFC Fish Hawk in the Potomac River at a pier at Bryan Point, Accokeek, Maryland

Fish Hawk was designed to work year-round in an annual cycle in which she engaged in scientific research involving trawling and dredging in the summer, then steamed north to collect and hatch cod eggs in late autumn. With the arrival of winter, she steamed south to hatch shad eggs, moving to various points along the coast during the winter and spring in accordance with the natural timing of shad runs. With those completed, she renewed the cycle by returning to research work during the following summer. As fisheries researchers later came to understand the reproduction of Spanish mackerel and striped bass, Fish Hawk added hatching of these species to her annual routine.

Although her hatching equipment was not yet fully complete and installed, the Fish Commission wanted Fish Hawk to begin deep-sea exploration activities before the 1880 season was over, and decided that she should get underway and return to the Pusey and Jones shipyard later for the installation of the remainder of her hatching equipment. Accordingly, Fish Hawk departed the Pusey and Jones shipyard on 29 July 1880 with a United States Navy crew commanded by Lieutenant Tanner and proceeded to Fish Commission headquarters at Newport, Rhode Island, where she arrived on 2 August 1880. She made her first scientific cruise on 6 August 1880, embarking naturalists and spending the day trawling and dredging in Narragansett Bay west of Conanicut Island to test her equipment. On 3 September 1880, she briefly visited Woods Hole, Massachusetts, her future home port, for the first time.

Fish Hawk's capabilities launched a new era in both fisheries research and fish culture. In 1871 and 1875, the Fish Commission had studied the shallow waters in the vicinity of Woods Hole thoroughly, but until the commissioning of Fish Hawk had lacked a vessel able to operate farther offshore and gather information in deeper water. Her first assignment was to investigate a previously unknown fish, the tilefish, which a commercial fisherman had brought to the Fish Commission station in Gloucester, Massachusetts, in 1879. During September and early October 1880, operating from Newport, she made four voyages to dredge the edge of the continental shelf, during which she gathered data establishing the range and quantity of the tilefish, which later would become an important fishery. Such were her scientific capabilities that she also discovered 40 new species of mollusk and 20 new species of fishes during the four voyages; in the Report of the Commissioner for 1886, published in 1889, the Fish Commission described it as "a new and exceedingly rich fauna, both as regards fish and marine invertebrates." With the four voyages completed, she returned to Wilmington from 13 October to 13 November 1880 to have her hatching cones installed so that she could begin her first hatchery work with shad eggs off the southeast coast of the United States by about March 1881. With the cones installed, she proceeded to the Washington Navy Yard in Washington, D.C., where she arrived on 20 November 1880 and turned over samples collected during the 1880 season to the Smithsonian Institution. She then steamed to Point Lookout, Maryland, to collect oysters for the Fish Commission station at St. Jerome's Creek in Maryland. Plans called for her to spend the winter of 1880–1881 at the Washington Navy Yard, but ice formed on the Potomac River before she could return there, so instead she spent the winter at the Norfolk Navy Yard in Portsmouth, Virginia.

On 21 May 1885 Tanner was reassigned and replaced by Lieutenant (junior grade) Robert Platt, a veteran of the American Civil War.

Fish Hawk went on to serve the Fish Commission and its successor, the United States Bureau of Fisheries, for nearly 46 years, trawling and dredging to discover and investigate new fishery resources and to collect marine animals and plants to gather information about their identity and life history. She worked on the continental shelf along the entire U.S. East Coast from Maine to Florida, as well as in the Gulf of Mexico and off Puerto Rico. In December 1916, Fish Hawk participated in the eighth annual Convention of the Southern Commercial Congress in Norfolk, Virginia, joining the Bureau of Fisheries steamer Roosevelt in exhibiting several fishery-related items and devices.

In July 1918 the vessel was taken over by the Navy with assignment to its New London Experiment Station to assist with the development of submarine detection devices. French naval officers had brought information regarding use of supersonic equipment for echo ranging with tests of equipment aboard Fish Hawk in October. The report to the Naval Consulting Board dated November 7, 1918, states that, "Equipment located submarines at from 500 to 1,000 yards." The vessel was returned to the Bureau of Fisheries on 1 July 1919.

Fish Hawk made her last two cruises between October and December 1925, and the U.S. Bureau of Fisheries decommissioned her in January 1926. The Bureau replaced her that year with the fisheries research ship Albatross II.
