= Penguin (disambiguation) =

A penguin is a flightless bird from the Southern Hemisphere.

Penguin or penguins may also refer to:

== Arts and entertainment ==
- Penguin (album), by Fleetwood Mac
- Penguin (book), a children's picture book by Polly Dunbar
- Penguin (character), a villain in the Batman comic books
- Penguin (film), a 2020 Indian film
- Penguins (film), a 2019 Disney nature documentary film
- The Penguin King, a 2012 nature documentary, also released as Penguins and Penguins 3D
- The Penguin (TV series), a TV series on Max
- The Penguins, an American doo-wop band
- The Penguins of Madagascar, or simply Penguins!, an animated television series
- "Penguins", an episode of the television series Teletubbies
- Nickname for the nun who ran the Catholic orphanage in The Blues Brothers (film)
- Opus the Penguin, from the comic strip Bloom County by Berkeley Breathed
- "Penguin", a 2011 song by Christina Perri from Lovestrong

== Businesses ==
- Penguin (restaurant), a restaurant in Nahariya, Israel
- Penguin Group, a German owned publishing company
  - Penguin Books, the British arm of the Penguin Group
- Penguin Software, a 1980s video game publisher
- The Penguin, a Wilmington, North Carolina radio station brand that has broadcast on WGHJ, WFBT (FM), and WUIN (FM)
- Original Penguin, an American clothing brand

== Food ==
- Penguin Mints, a brand of caffeinated mints
- Penguin (biscuit), a brand of chocolate biscuit

== Military ==
- HMS Penguin, various Royal Navy ships
- USS Penguin, three United States Navy ships
- HMAS Penguin, various Royal Australian Navy ships and shore installations
- Penguin (missile), an anti-ship missile in service since 1972

== People ==
- Parit Chiwarak, Thai democracy activist
- George Mitchell (Irish criminal)

== Places ==
- Penguin, Tasmania, Australia, a town
- Penguin Island (disambiguation)
- Penguin Islands, Namibia
- Penguin Islands (Newfoundland and Labrador), Canada
- Penguin River, South Georgia Island
- Penguin Bay, South Georgia Island
- Penguin Bight, Seymour Island
- Penguin Heights, Queen Maud Land, Antarctica
- Penguin Point (disambiguation), three points in the Antarctic
- Three Penguins, Utah, USA

== Sports ==
- Pittsburgh Penguins, a National Hockey League team
- Wilkes-Barre/Scranton Penguins, an American Hockey League team
- Fischtown Pinguins, a German ice hockey team based in Bremerhaven
- Krefeld Pinguine, a German ice hockey team also known as the Krefeld Penguins
- Penguin Football Club, an Australian rules football club based in Penguin, Tasmania
- Dominican Penguins, the sports teams of Dominican University of California
- Youngstown State Penguins, the sports teams of Youngstown State University
- Penguin (dinghy), a class of racing sailboat
- Ron Cey (born 1948), American retired Major League Baseball player nicknamed "The Penguin"
- Penguins Cup, an ice hockey tournament for over 80 high school teams from western Pennsylvania

== Transportation ==
- MV Penguin, a cargo liner in commission with the United States Bureau of Fisheries from 1930 to 1940 and with the United States Fish and Wildlife Service from 1940 to 1950
- MV Penguin II, a United States Fish and Wildlife Service ship in commission from 1950 to 1963
- SS Penguin, a New Zealand ferry which sank near Wellington in 1909
- MacCready Gossamer Penguin, a solar-powered experimental aircraft
- Antarctic Snow Cruiser, a 1930s vehicle designed for transport in Antarctic, also known as "The Penguin" and "Penguin 1"

== Other uses ==
- Penguin (solitaire), a card game
- Google Penguin, a Google search engine optimization
- Penguin Award, an annual award given for excellence in broadcasting by the Television Society of Australia
- Penguin High School, Penguin, Tasmania
- An archaic name for the great auk
- Penguin (CIA agent), a nickname originated in the Soviet Bloc for CIA agents

== See also ==
- Pinguin (disambiguation)
- Pingouin (disambiguation)
- Pengouin, a French ship wrecked in February 1881
