= Cape Webb =

Cape Webb (67°51′S 146°55′E) is a coastal point separating Ainsworth Bay and Doolette Bay, also serving to mark on the west the depression occupied by Ninnis Glacier. Discovered by the Australasian Antarctic Expedition (1911–1914) under Douglas Mawson, and named after Eric Webb (Webb Subglacial Trench, q.v.), chief magnetician of the Main Base Party of the expedition.
