= Penguin Island =

Penguin Island may refer to:

== Islands ==
=== Antarctica ===
- Alternative name for the Afuera Islands
- Penguin Island (South Shetland Islands)

=== Australia ===
- Penguin Island (South Australia)
- Penguin Island (Tasmania)
- Penguin Islet (Tasmania)
- Penguin Island (Western Australia)

=== Canada ===
- Penguin Island, Newfoundland, now known as Funk Island

=== New Zealand ===
- Penguin Island, New Zealand, off D'Urville Island, New Zealand

== Arts and entertainment ==
- Penguin Island (novel), a satirical novel by Anatole France (1908)
- Penguin Island (TV series), a 6-part Australian documentary miniseries

== See also ==
- Penguin Islands, Namibia
- Penguin Islands (Newfoundland and Labrador), Canada
- Île des Pingouins, Crozet Archipelago, South Indian Ocean
