= Pingouin =

Pingouin is a French vernacular term for two species of auks, the lesser auk and the great auk; it is used colloquially to designate penguins. In English, it may refer to:

== Places ==
- 6790 Pingouin, an asteroid
- Île des Pingouins (French: Penguin Island), Crozet Archipelago, south Indian Ocean

== Transportation and vehicles ==
- Nord Pingouin, a French monoplane
- Aerodynos JA 177 Pingouin, a homebuilt kit monoplane ultralight
- Pingouin, a French tugboat originally built in 1945 as USS YTL 556 by Everett-Pacific Shipbuilding & Dry Dock Company
- Le Pinguoin, former name of the racing sailing yacht IMOCA 60 Whirlpool 2

== Other uses ==
- Pingouins de Morzine-Avoriaz, an ice hockey team based in Morzine

== See also ==
- Pengouin, a French ship wrecked in February 1881
- Penguin (disambiguation)
- Pinguin (disambiguation)
