= Cape Bage =

Headland in Antarctica

Cape Bage (67°43′S 146°34′E) is a prominent point on the coast between Murphy Bay and Ainsworth Bay. Discovered in 1912 by the Australasian Antarctic Expedition (1911–1914) under Douglas Mawson, who named it for Lieutenant R. Bage, the expedition's astronomer, assistant magnetician and recorder of tides.
