= HMS Penguin =

Seven ships of the Royal Navy have borne the name HMS Penguin. A penguin is a flightless aquatic bird.

- HMS Penguin (1757) was a 20-gun post ship. She was originally launched in 1731 as Dolphine, then renamed Firebrand, and finally renamed Penguin in 1757. The French captured her in 1760.
- HMS Penguin (1772) was an 8-gun sloop building in 1772. She was not completed and was broken up in 1775.
- HMS Penguin (1776) a 10-gun schooner purchased in Newfoundland and wrecked in a storm in the Bay of Bulls in 1778
- HMS Penguin was a 16-gun brig. She was originally the Dutch Komeet and was captured in 1795 by HMS Unicorn off the coast of Ireland. She was originally named HMS Comeet before being renamed to HMS Penguin in 1796. She was sold in 1809.
- HMS Penguin (1813) was a 19-gun Cruizer-class brig-sloop launched in 1813. The American ship-sloop USS Hornet captured her in 1815 off Tristan da Cunha and afterwards scuttled her as Penguin was so damaged as to be of no value as a prize.
- HMS Penguin (1838) was a 6-gun packet brig laid down in 1838. In 1858 she became a coastguard watchvessel. She was renamed WV.31 in 1863 and sold in 1873.
- HMS Penguin (1860) was a Philomel-class gunvessel launched in 1860 at Liverpool. She was sold in 1870 for scrap.
- HMS Penguin (1876) was an Osprey-class sloop launched in 1876. In 1890 she became a survey ship and in 1908 a depot ship. She was transferred to the Royal Australian Navy in 1913 and sold in 1924. She became a crane hulk and was burnt in 1960.

== See also ==
- Penguin (disambiguation)
- HMAS Penguin, for ships and shore facilities of the Royal Australian Navy that have borne the same name
