= Leptospermum glabrescens =

Scientific classification
- Kingdom: Plantae
- Clade: Tracheophytes
- Clade: Angiosperms
- Clade: Eudicots
- Clade: Rosids
- Order: Myrtales
- Family: Myrtaceae
- Genus: Leptospermum
- Species: L. glabrescens

Binomial name
- Leptospermum glabrescens N.A.Wakef.
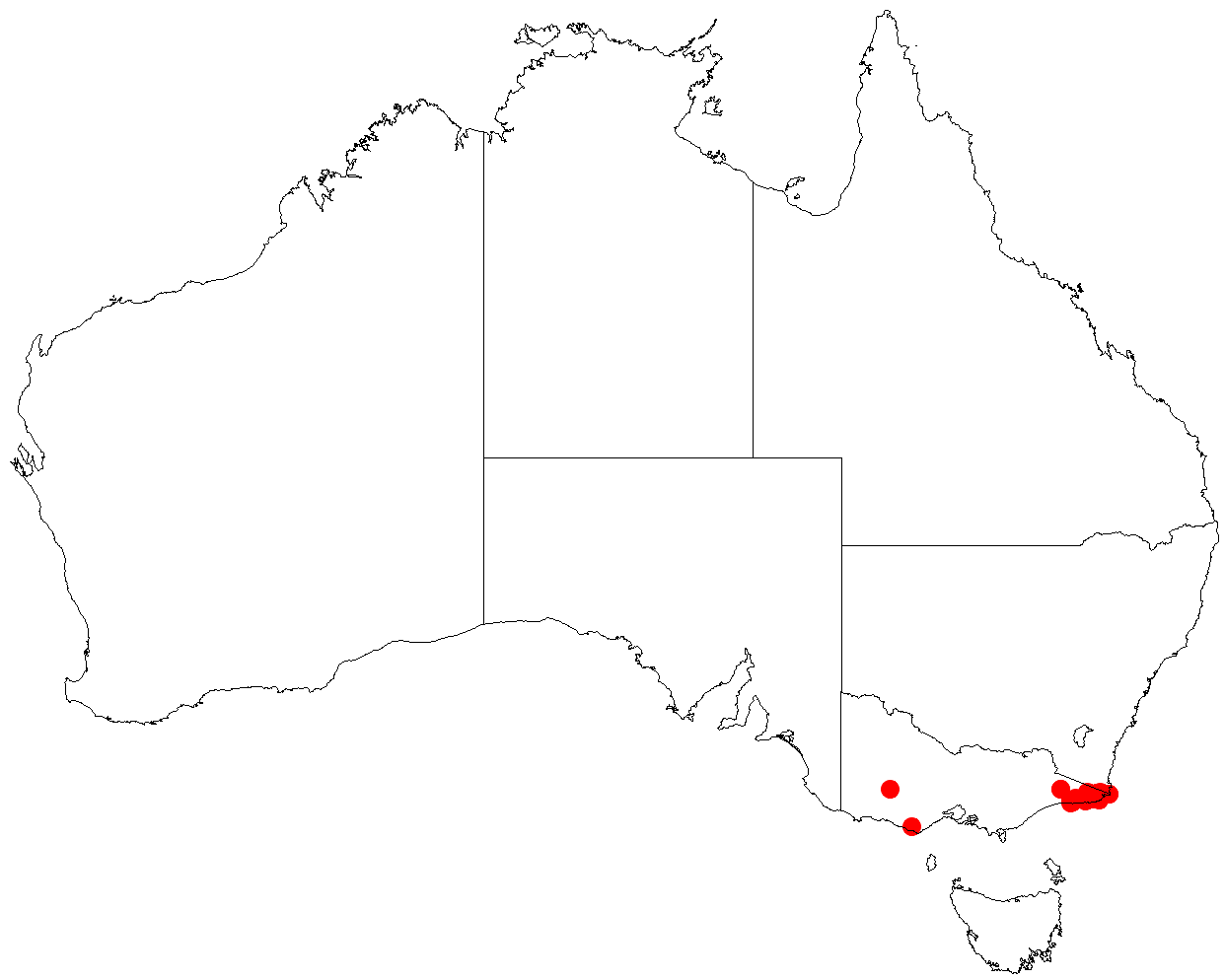
- Occurrence data from AVH

Species of plant

Leptospermum glabrescens, commonly known as the smooth teatree, is a shrub or small tree that is endemic to East Gippsland in Victoria, Australia. It has linear, elliptic or narrow egg-shaped leaves, white flowers arranged singly on short side shoots and fruit that remain on the plant.

== Description ==
Leptospermum glabrescens is a shrub or small tree that typically grows to a height of 1.5–6 m (4 ft 11 in – 19 ft 8 in). It has smooth bark on the smaller stems, that is shed in stringy strips. The leaves are linear, elliptic or narrow egg-shaped leaves with the narrower end towards the base, mostly 5–13 mm (0.20–0.51 in) long and 1–3 mm (0.039–0.118 in) wide, tapering to a very short petiole, and glabrous. The flowers are arranged singly on short side branches and are about 12 mm (0.47 in) in diameter. There are broad, brownish bracts at the base of the flower bud but that usually fall off as the flower develops. The floral cup is about 3 mm (0.12 in) long and densely hairy. The sepals are more or less round, about 2 mm (0.079 in) long and hairy, the petals are white, 3–5 mm (0.12–0.20 in) long and the stamens 2.5–3 mm (0.098–0.118 in) long. Flowering occurs from December to January and the fruit is a capsule 5–7 mm (0.20–0.28 in) wide and remains on the plant at maturity.

== Taxonomy and naming ==
Leptospermum glabrescens was first formally described in 1955 by Norman Arthur Wakefield in The Victorian Naturalist, although the original description included specimens now recognised as L. lanigerum. The specific epithet (glabrescens) is a Latin word meaning "almost glabrous" or "becoming glabrous with age".

== Distribution and habitat ==
Smooth teatree grows in swampy areas and on the edge of watercourses in east Gippsland, from near Cape Conran to near Mallacoota, with a disjunct population near Buchan.
