= Ainsworth Bay =

Ainsworth Bay may refer to:

- Ainsworth Bay, Antarctica, an inlet in Antarctica
- Ainsworth Bay, Chile, an inlet in Tierra del Fuego, Chile
