= Penguin Point =

Penguin Point may refer to a number of places in the Antarctic:

- Penguin Point (Coronation Island)
- Penguin Point (George V Land)
- Penguin Point (Seymour Island)
- Penguin Point (restaurant chain)
