= Herbert Dyce Murphy =

Australian adventurer

Herbert Dyce Murphy (18 October 1879 – 20 July 1971) was an Australian adventurer and raconteur. He was perhaps best known for his participation in the Australasian Antarctic Expedition.

== Early life and family ==
Murphy was born 18 October 1879 at Como, South Yarra, Melbourne, son of Alexander Dyce Murphy and his wife Ada Maud Florence nee Hopkins. Herbert attended Cumloden school, Melbourne Church of England Grammar School (1889–90), and went to Tonbridge School, Kent (1894–95). As a schoolboy he went on three Arctic voyages on the yacht Gladiator with his uncle Sir William Waller. He matriculated from Brasenose College, Oxford, in May 1900 and passed Responsions.

== Early adventures ==
During university he was a navigator on the Dundee whaler Balaena on a voyage to Franz Josef Land. He was a seaman on the Hope which transported reindeer from Norway to Russia.

== Australasian Antarctic Expedition ==
Murphy was principally tasked to be in charge of stores at the Cape Denison base at Commonwealth Bay. He led the supporting party (together with Hunter and Laseron), which had the job of laying down stores at intermediate points for the later expedition on sledges to the South Magnetic Pole undertaken by Bage, Webb and Hurley.

In a letter to his parents in January 1912, he described of portion of the voyage south from Macquarie Island to Commonwealth Bay:

The ship went down to Caroline Cove, at the south end of Macquarie Island, and we went ashore to get water. It was most beautifully light all night. There were high hills, with tussock grass and myriads of penguins. We only got a little water, for early in the morning the ship's anchors dragged. She bumped on to the rocks, and was nearly wrecked. We thought for an hour or so we should lose the ship, but she came off about 5 in the morning. We had a splendid run down, bright and warm in the sun almost until we met the first ice. It was foggy on December 29 in the afternoon, after a fine morning, and about 3 o'clock it got very cold, when all at once an iceberg suddenly appeared, and there were lots of little pieces of ice all over the perfectly calm sea. We passed upwards of a dozen 'bergs' in the first few hours, and thousands of pieces of ice of all sizes, and at about 9 p.m. pushed through a couple of miles of floating ice. The blue tints in the icebergs were very beautiful. When we tried to get to the land marked on the maps by Wilkes, in 1840, all we got to was an ice barrier 30ft or 40ft high, extending for miles — a most extraordinary sight. We had a two days' hurricane there, but hardly felt it, as we just kept under the lee of the barrier, but the snow, blowing off the top of this huge wall over the ship's mast-heads, was an indication of what the wind must have been like up there. It is not so fearfully cold, 28deg. Fahr., but always snowing or overcast. We only have had one day's really fine weather since December 29, but that was gorgeous. We are now somewhere — we don't know quite where, as we have not had an observation for days, but we are close on some land, if we could only see it.

== Personal life ==
Murphy lived for many years at a property that he owned at Mount Martha, Mornington Peninsula.

On 13 February 1934, Murphy married Muriel Idrene Webster at St. John's Church, Toorak.

Murphy Bay was discovered in 1912 by a member of the Australasian Antarctic Expedition and named by Douglas Mawson after Murphy.
