= Pinguin =

Pinguin may refer to:

- Bromelia pinguin, an edible plant
- Fischtown Pinguins, a German ice hockey team
- German auxiliary cruiser Pinguin, a World War II naval ship
- Memín Pinguín, a fictional comic book character

== See also ==
- Penguin (disambiguation)
- Pingouin (disambiguation)
