= List of shipwrecks in February 1881 =

The list of shipwrecks in February 1881 includes ships sunk, foundered, grounded, or otherwise lost during February 1881.

== 1 February ==
List of shipwrecks: 1 February 1881
Ship	State	Description
Gwendoline	United Kingdom	The steamship ran aground and sank at Port Edgar, Lothian. She was refloated on 18 January and towed in to Grangemouth, Stirlingshire by the steamship Glaucus (United Kingdom).
Harvest Queen	United Kingdom	The barque foundered in the Atlantic Ocean. She was on a voyage from Baltimore, Maryland, United States to Sunderland, County Durham.
Kate	United Kingdom	The steamship ran aground on the Chappel Rock, off the coast of Glamorgan. She was on a voyage from Havre de Grâce, Seine-Inférieure, France to Cardiff, Glamorgan. She was refloated and taken in to Penarth, Glamorgan.
Primus	United Kingdom	The steamship ran aground off Cardiff. She was on a voyage from Cardiff to Rouen, Seine-Inférieure. She dragged her anchors the next day and was driven into the brigantine Nadir (Austria-Hungary). She was taken in to Cardiff.
Senior	Netherlands	The steamship ran aground at Maassluis, South Holland, Netherlands. She was on a voyage from Bilbao, Spain to Rotterdam, South Holland.
Solon	United Kingdom	The steamship was driven ashore in the Dardanelles at Gallipoli, Ottoman Empire. She was on a voyage from Newcastle upon Tyne, Northumberland to Odesa, Russia.

== 2 February ==
List of shipwrecks: 2 February 1881
Ship	State	Description
Antonio Ottone	Italy	The brig was wrecked on the Cross Sands, in the North Sea off the coast of Suffolk, United Kingdom. All fifteen people on board were rescued. She was on a voyage from Newcastle upon Tyne, Northumberland, United Kingdom to New York, United States.
Dragoon	United Kingdom	The steamship ran aground off Vlissingen, Zeeland, Netherlands. She was on a voyage from Newcastle upon Tyne to Antwerp, Belgium. She was refloated and resumed her voyage.
Julia	United Kingdom	The brigantine ran aground on the Pladden Rocks, at the entrance to the Belfast Lough and was wrecked. Her crew were rescued. She was on a voyage from Workington, Cumberland to Belfast, County Antrim.
Pacific	Norway	The brigantine was wrecked on Boa Vista, Cape Verde Islands. Her crew were rescued. She was on a voyage from Cette, Hérault, France to Santos, Brazil.
Pepe Tono	Spain	The ship departed from Pensacola, Florida, United States for Barcelona. No further trace.
Royal Visitor	United Kingdom	The full-rigged ship ran aground at Greenock, Renfrewshire. She was on a voyage from Moulmein, Burma to Port Glasgow, Renfrewshire. She was refloated and resumed her voyage.
Unnamed	United Kingdom	The full-rigged ship ran aground off Southend, Essex. She was refloated.
Unnamed	United Kingdom	The schooner was driven ashore near the Cloch Lighthouse, Renfrewshire. She was refloated with assistance and taken in to Greenock.

== 3 February ==
List of shipwrecks: 3 February 1881
Ship	State	Description
City of Richmond	United Kingdom	The steamship was driven ashore at "Port Rhylfydd", Anglesey. Her crew were rescued. City of Richmond was on a voyage from Mobile, Alabama, United States to Liverpool, Lancashire. She broke up on 4 March.
Mary Stuart	Canada	The ship ran aground on the Shingles Sands, off the coast of Kent, United Kingdom. She was on a voyage from South Shields, County Durham, United Kingdom to New Orleans, Louisiana, United States. She was refloated and found to be severely leaky. Twenty Margate boatmen went aboard and she made for London, United Kingdom.
May Queen	United Kingdom	The dandy was driven ashore at Saltfleet Haven, Lincolnshire. She was on a voyage from Plymouth, Devon to Grimsby, Lincolnshire.
Nano B.	Austria-Hungary	The barque was wrecked at Lagos, Portugal with some loss of life. She was on a voyage from Cardiff, Glamorgan, United Kingdom to Alexandria, Egypt.
Sceptre	United Kingdom	The steamship ran aground on the Ketelplaat, in the Scheldt.
Stamford	United Kingdom	The steamship struck the west point of Ouessant, Finistère, France and foundered with the loss of thirteen of her crew. She was on a voyage from Bilbao, Spain to Middlesbrough, Yorkshire.
Westbourne	United Kingdom	The steamship was driven ashore at Bremen, Germany.

== 4 February ==
List of shipwrecks: 4 February 1881
Ship	State	Description
Astarte	United Kingdom	The barque was driven ashore and wrecked at Ringfadd Point, County Down. Her crew survived. She was on a voyage from Dublin to Glasgow, Renfrewshire.
Bremen	Germany	The full-rigged ship was wrecked at Levenwick, Shetland Islands, United Kingdom with the loss of thirteen of her twenty crew. She was on a voyage from Bremen to Baltimore, Maryland, United States.
City of Dublin	United Kingdom	The steamship collided with the steamship Kronprinz Friedrich Wilhelm (Germany) and sank in the Elbe downstream of Cuxhaven, Germany with the loss of six of her eighteen crew. Survivors were rescued by Kronprinz Friedrich Wilhelm.
Helena	United States	The ship was driven ashore on the Mull of Galloway, Wigtownshire, United Kingdom. She was on a voyage from Workington, Cumberland to Donaghadee, County Antrim, United Kingdom.
Nestor	United Kingdom	The schooner was driven ashore at Ayr. She was on a voyage from Belfast, County Antrim to Ayr.
Sarah Mandell	United Kingdom	The ship departed from Pensacola, Florida, United States for Dordt, South Holland, Netherlands. No further trace.
State of Florida	United Kingdom	The steamship was driven ashore in Machray Bay, Islay, Inner Hebrides. She was on a voyage from New York to Greenock, Renfrewshire. She was refloated.
Tay	United Kingdom	The schooner was driven ashore at Santon Head, 2 nautical miles (3.7 km) south west of Port Soderick, Isle of Man. Her crew were rescued.
Tordenskjold	Flag unknown	The ship was driven ashore at Theddlethorpe, Lincolnshire, United Kingdom. She was on a voyage from Savannah, Georgia, United States to Goole, Yorkshire, United Kingdom. She was towed off by two tugs and taken in to Grimsby, Lincolnshire.
Unnamed	United Kingdom	The tug was driven ashore at Ringfadd Point. She was refloated and taken in to Glasgow.

== 5 February ==
List of shipwrecks: 5 February 1881
Ship	State	Description
Abbotsford	United Kingdom	The steamship was driven ashore at Flamborough Head, Yorkshire. She was on a voyage from Dunkirk, Nord to Leith, Lothian. She was refloated and completed her voyage.
Broomhill	United Kingdom	The steamship was driven ashore at Sunderland, County Durham. Her eighteen crew were rescued by the Sunderland Lifeboat Florence Nightingale ( Royal National Lifeboat Institution). Broomhill was on a voyage fromm Dundee, Forfarshire to Sunderland. She was refloated and beached.
Catalina van Calcar	Netherlands	The galiot was driven ashore and wrecked 3 nautical miles (5.6 km) north of Bayonne, Basses-Pyrénées, France. Her crew were rescued. She was on a voyage from London, United Kingdom to Bayonne.
Charles	United Kingdom	The ship departed from Youghal, County Cork for Pont-Audemer, Eure, France. No further trace,. reported missing.
Electra	United Kingdom	The ship departed from Hull, Yorkshire for Fareham, Hampshire. No further trace, reported missing.
Glenisla	United Kingdom	The steamship was damaged by fire at Charleston, South Carolina, United States.
Jeune Pauline	France	The schooner was wrecked in the Glénan Islands, Finistère.
Kismet	United States	The ship departed from Bahia, Brazil for New York. No further trace, reported overdue.
Ocean King	United Kingdom	The barque struck a rock and foundered off Port Nolloth, Cape Colony. Her crew were rescued. She was on a voyage from Swansea, Glamorgan to Port Nolloth.

== 6 February ==
List of shipwrecks: 6 February 1881
Ship	State	Description
Bessie Rodgers	United Kingdom	The schooner was abandoned off St. Ives, Cornwall. Her crew were rescued by a pilot boat. She was on a voyage from Swansea, Glamorgan to Devoran, Cornwall.
Dalkarles	Sweden	The barque ran aground in the River Lee.
Eversfield	United Kingdom	The steamship ran aground on the Burbo Bank, in Liverpool Bay and was abandoned by all but her captain. She was on a voyage from Workington, Cumberland to Liverpool. She was refloated with the assistance of a tug and towed in to Liverpool.
Lizzie Stuart	United Kingdom	The steamship ran aground at Bilbao, Spain and was holed by her anchor. She put back to Bilbao.
Loyal	United Kingdom	The fishing smack ran aground on the Trinity Sand, off the mouth of the Humber. Her crew were rescued by the Spurn Point Lifeboat. She subsequently became a wreck.
Maira Leonie	France	The ship ran aground and sank at St. Ubes, Portugal. She was on a voyage from St. Ubes to Dunkirk, Nord.
Menai Packet	United Kingdom	The smack sprang a leak and sank off Llanelly, Glamorgan. Her crew were rescued. She was on a voyage from Avonmouth, Somerset to Londonderry.
T. J. Mitchell	United States	The schooner sank in a storm in Pensacola Bay.
Wave	United Kingdom	The ship departed from Swansea for Catania, Sicily, Italy. No further trace, reported missing.
Zuma	United Kingdom	The ship ran aground on the Longsand, in The Wash and was abandoned by her crew. She was later refloated and towed in to King's Lynn, Norfolk.

== 7 February ==
List of shipwrecks: 7 February 1881
Ship	State	Description
Assistance	(United Kingdom of Great Britain and Ireland) Guernsey	The schooner ran aground on the Brambles, in the Solent. She was on a voyage from Guernsey to Eling, Hampshire.
Bohemian	United Kingdom	The steamship was wrecked at Mizen Head, County Cork with the loss of 35 of the 57 people on board, and that of a rescuer. She was on a voyage from Boston, Massachusetts, United States to Liverpool, Lancashire.
Bransty	United Kingdom	The brigantine was wrecked on the Long Rocks, in Dundrum Bay. Her six crew were rescued by the Dundrum Lifeboat Pyrella ( Royal National Lifeboat Institution). Bransty was on a voyage from Newry, County Down to Bristol, Gloucestershire
Clodagh	United Kingdom	The ship departed from Cardiff, Glamorgan for Ballynane, County Kerry. No further trace, presumed foundered with the loss of all hands.
Durham Packet	(United Kingdom of Great Britain and Ireland) Guernsey	The brig was driven ashore and wrecked at Seaham, County Durham. Her seven crew were rescued by rocket apparatus. She was on a voyage from London to South Shields, County Durham.
Earl of Durham	United Kingdom	The steamship was driven ashore at Saltburn, Yorkshire. She was refloated and resumed her voyage.
Ella Beatrice	United Kingdom	The barque was wrecked on the north coast of Japan 50 nautical miles (93 km) from Hakodadi. Her crew were rescued. She was on a voyage from Sydney, New South Wales to Shanghai, China.
Faithful	United Kingdom	The schooner was wrecked on the Tynemouth Rocks, Northumberland. Her crew were rescued by the South Shields Lifeboat Tom Perry ( Royal National Lifeboat Institution).
Fern	United Kingdom	The steamship ran aground and sank near Ballina, County Mayo. She was on a voyage from Ballina to Glasgow, Renfrewshire.
Friendship	United Kingdom	The schooner was driven ashore at Hartlepool, County Durham. Her four crew were rescued by rocket apparatus. She was on a voyage from Rye, Sussex to Warkworth, Northumberland.
Hawk	United Kingdom	The smack struck the Barnard Sand, in the North Sea off the coast of Suffolk. She was beached at Benacre, Suffolk, where she became a wreck. Her crew survived.
J. B. Eminson	United Kingdom	The steamship ran aground and sank at Sunderland, County Durham. Her crew were rescued by the tug Express (United Kingdom). J. B. Eminson was on a voyage from London to Sunderland.
Julia	United Kingdom	The brig ran aground on the Woolseners, in the English Channel off Hayling Island, Hampshire and was abandoned. Her crew survived. She was on a voyage from Newcastle upon Tyne, Northumberland to Weymouth, Dorset.
Kronprinz von Preussen	Germany	The brigantine was drive ashore at New Grimsby, Isles of Scilly, United Kingdom. She was refloated.
Mermaid	United Kingdom	The schooner was driven ashore near Leith, Lothian. She was on a voyage from "Stoneham" to Sunderland. She was refloated with the assistance of a tug and taken in to Leith in a leaky condition.
Miner	United Kingdom	The flat capsized in the River Severn. Her crew were rescued. She was on a voyage from Portishead, Somerset to Gloucester.
Mischief	United Kingdom	The ship was driven ashore at Hartlepool. Her four crew were rescued by the Hartlepool Lifeboat John Clay Barlow ( Royal National Lifeboat Institution). Mischief was on a voyage from Rye to Warkworth. She was refloated.
Star	United Kingdom	The schooner was driven at Horden Dand, County Durham. Her four crew survived Star was on a voyage from Ipswich, Suffolk to Sunderland. She subsequently became a wreck.
Sutherland	Canada	The barquentine was driven ashore and wrecked at Garrock Head, Isle of Bute, Argyllshire, United Kingdom. Her crew were rescued. She was on a voyage from Troon, Ayrshire, United Kingdom to Matanzas, Cuba.
Thomas	United Kingdom	The ship was driven ashore at Hartlepool. Her three crew were rescued by the Hartlepool Lifeboat John Clay Barlow ( Royal National Lifeboat Institution). Thomas was on a voyage from King's Lynn, Norfolk to Stockton-on Tees, County Durham. She was refloated and taken in to Hartlepool in a leaky condition.
Ulysses	United Kingdom	The smack collided with Western Ocean (United Kingdom) and was severely damaged. Ulysses put in to Great Yarmouth, Norfolk.
Yorkshire Lass	United Kingdom	The ship was driven ashore at Hartlepool. Her crew were rescued by the Hartlepool Lifeboat. She was on a voyage from Boston, Lincolnshire to Stockton-on-Tees.
Unnamed	Netherlands	The fishing smack was run down and sunk by the steamship Braunschweig (Germany) with some loss of life. Survivors were rescued by Braunschweig.
'Unnamed	United Kingdom	The steam cutter, belonging to the Duke of Edinburgh's yacht Lively, sank at Sheerness, Kent. Her crew were rescued.

== 8 February ==
List of shipwrecks: 8 February 1881
Ship	State	Description
Ascalon	United Kingdom	The ship was severely damaged by fire at the Victoria Docks, London.
Bernadette, and Susanna Elizabeth	France; Netherlands	The lugger Bernadette collided with the barque Susanna Elizabeth. Both vessels were beached at the Rammekens Castle, Zeeland. Bernadette was on a voyage from Antwerp, Belgium to Bordeaux, Gironde. She was refloated and taken in to Vlissingen, Zeeland. Susanna Elizabeth was on a voyage from Antwerp to New York, United States.
Breeze	United Kingdom	The steamship ran aground at Calais, France and was damaged. She was on a voyage from Calais to Dover, Kent. She was refloated and put back to Calais.
Brothers	United Kingdom	The ketch struck the Patch Sand and was abandoned off Caldy Island, Pembrokeshire. Her crew were rescued by the Tenby Lifeboat. Brothers was on a voyage from Plymouth to Ilfracombe, Devon. She was subsequently taken in to Tenby.
Camera	Spain	The steamship ran aground in the Guadalquivir.
Dagmar	United Kingdom	The ship was wrecked near Arendal, Norway. She was on a voyage from Hull, Yorkshire to Copenhagen, Denmark.
Enterprise	United Kingdom	The schooner was driven ashore at Newry, County Antrim.
Glenda	United Kingdom	The barque was driven ashore at Cardiff, Glamorgan. She was on a voyage from Penarth, Glamorgan to Havana, Cuba. She was refloated with assistance from the tug Royal Saxon (United Kingdom).
Halvard	Norway	The full-rigged ship was discovered in distress in the North Sea by the smacks Chief and Star (both United Kingdom). She was towed in to Hartlepool, County Durham, United Kingdom in a waterlogged condition on 14 February. Halvard was on a voyage from Fredrikstadt to London.
Kate	United Kingdom	The schooner was driven ashore 1 nautical mile (1.9 km) east of Llandelhaearn, Caernarfonshire. Her crew were rescued.
Matilda Hilyard	United Kingdom	The barque was abandoned 3 nautical miles (5.6 km) off Criccieth, Caernarfonshire. Her crew were rescued by the Criccieth Lifeboat. She was on a voyage from Greenock, Renfrewshire to Rio de Janeiro, Brazil. She came ashore at Llanbedrog, Caernarfonshire. Matilda Hillyard was refloated on 27 February and taken into Liverpool, Lancashire.
Pearl	United Kingdom	The brigantine was driven ashore at Penarth.
Pilot	United Kingdom	The smack sank at Swansea, Glamorgan.
Progress, and Sirius	United Kingdom	The steam cutter Progress was run into by the smack Sirius off the mouth of the Humber. Both vessels sank with the loss of a crew member from Progress. Survivors were rescued by a Trinity House steam yacht.
Rowena	United Kingdom	The brig foundered in the English Channel with the loss of all nine crew. She was on a voyage from the River Tyne to Cowes, Isle of Wight.
Tern	United Kingdom	The steamship ran aground in the River Moy. She was on a voyage from Ballina, County Mayo to Glasgow, Renfrewshire.
Thames	United Kingdom	The steamship was damaged by fire at the Victoria Docks, London.
Triana	Spain	The steamship ran aground in the Guadalquivir.
Velasquez	United Kingdom	The steamship ran aground in the Guadalquivir.
Victory	United Kingdom	The ship was driven ashore and wrecked at Broomhill Point, County Waterford. Her crew were rescued. She was on a voyage from Newport, Monmouthshire to Waterford.
Zenia	United Kingdom	The ship was wrecked at King's Lynn, Norfolk. Her crew were rescued. She was on a voyage from King's Lynn to Burghhead, Lothian.
Unnamed	France	A three-masted schooner foundered in Bideford Bay, near Clovelly, Devon with the loss of all hands.
Ten unnamed vessels	United Kingdom	A schooner was driven ashore at Woolwich, Kent. Nine barges sank in the River Thames between London and the Nore.
Several unnamed vessels	United Kingdom	The barges were destroyed by fire and sank at the Victoria Docks, London.

== 9 February ==
List of shipwrecks: 9 February 1881
Ship	State	Description
Celestial Empire	United Kingdom	The full-rigged ship was driven ashore at Hythe, Kent. She was on a voyage from Calcutta, India to London. She was refloated with the assistance of four tugs, which included Anglia and Robert Bruce (both United Kingdom) and resumed her voyage.
Egbert	Canada	The barque was wrecked at Saint-Quentin-en-Tourmont, Somme, France with the loss of all ten crew. She was on a voyage from Saint Domingo to Rotterdam, South Holland, Netherlands.
Enterprise	United Kingdom	The brigantine was driven ashore at Carlingford, County Louth. She was refloated the next day and was towed in to Carlingford by a tug.
Flora	Norway	The barque foundered in the North Sea 100 nautical miles (190 km) east of Inchcape, Fife, United Kingdom (57°10′N 0°30′E). Her eight crew were rescued by the barque Titania (Norway). .
G. W. Woolff	United Kingdom	The ship ran aground in the River Lagan. She was on a voyage from Philadelphia, Pennsylvania, United States to Belfast, County Antrim.
Humber	United Kingdom	The barque was driven ashore near Bristol, Gloucestershire. She was refloated and taken in to Avonmouth, Somerset.
Industry	United Kingdom	The ship was driven ashore at Burnham-on-Sea, Somerset.
Lizzie	United Kingdom	The ketch was abandoned in Perran Bay. Her four crew were rescued by the Newquay Lifeboat Pendock Neale ( Royal National Lifeboat Institution). Lizzie was on a voyage from Waterford to Falmouth, Cornwall. She subsequently drove ashore and was wrecked.
Louise Henry	United Kingdom	The ship put in to Boulogne, Pas-de-Calais, France in a sinking condition. she was on a voyage from Newcastle upon Tyne, Northumberland to Catania, Italy
Monsoon	United Kingdom	The barque was abandoned in the Atlantic Ocean 80 nautical miles (150 km) west north west of the Isles of Scilly. Her thirteen crew were rescued by the schooner Ernest and the brig Miranda (both United Kingdom). Monsoon was on a voyage from Liverpool, Lancashire to Payta, Peru.

== 10 February ==
List of shipwrecks: 10 February 1881
Ship	State	Description
Arabia	United Kingdom	The schooner was driven ashore at Goswick, Northumberland. Her crew survived. She broke up on 3 March.
Atlas	France	The brig was driven ashore on Guadeloupe by a tsunami.
Berwickshire	United Kingdom	The full-rigged ship was driven against the quayside and severely damaged at Greenock, Renfrewshire.
Charlotte	United Kingdom	The schooner was driven ashore at Stornoway, Isle of Lewis, Outer Hebrides. She was later refloated and taken in to Stornoway for repairs.
Esther	United Kingdom	The fishing boat capsized in the Firth of Forth with the loss of all four crew.
Etincelle	France	The brig was driven ashore on Guadeloupe by a tsunami.
Eudoxie Adolphine	France	The brig was driven ashore on Guadeloupe by a tsunami.
Fairfax	United Kingdom	The steamship was driven ashore at the Crowlink Gap Coastguard Station, Sussex. Her sixteen crew were rescued by the Coastguard. Fairfax was on a voyage from Havre de Grâce, Seine-Inférieure, France to the River Tyne. She was consequently condemned.
Ridge Park	South Australia	The cargo ship sank after hitting the Beware Reef, Cape Conran, Victoria.
Sophia Holton	United Kingdom	The ship was wrecked on the coast of Sussex. Her three crew were rescued by a Coastguard galley and the Rye Lifeboat.
Two unnamed vessels	United Kingdom	The lighters sank at Greenwich.

== 11 February ==
List of shipwrecks: 11 February 1881
Ship	State	Description
August	Germany	The barque was driven ashore and wrecked at Saint-Jean-de-Luz, Basses-Pyrénées, France. Her crew were rescued. She was on a voyage from Baltimore, Maryland, United States to Saint-Jean-de-Luz.
Criterion	United Kingdom	The brig was driven ashore and wrecked at Saint-Jean-de-Luz. Her crew were rescued. She was on a voyage from Sheerness, Kent to Saint-Jean-de-Luz.
George and Mary	United Kingdom	The schooner was driven ashore and wrecked at Goodwick, Pembrokeshire. Her five crew were rescued by the Goodwick Lifeboat Helen of Foxley ( Royal National Lifeboat Institution). George and Mary was on a voyage from Ardrossan, Ayrshire to Newport, Monmouthshire.
John Ormston	United Kingdom	The steamship collided with the steamship John M'Intyre and sank in the River Thames near Gravesend, Kent. John Ormston was on a voyage from London to Newcastle upon Tyne, Northumberland.
Jubilee	United Kingdom	The ship was run into by the steamship Salerno (United Kingdom) and was beached at Clee Ness, Lincolnshire. She was refloated and towed in to Grimsby, Lincolnshire.
Lady Maxwell	United Kingdom	The ship ran aground at Maryport, Cumberland and was run into by Alma (United Kingdom).
Marcellus	France	The brig was driven ashore and wrecked at Saint-Jean-de-Luz. Her crew were rescued.
Norma	United Kingdom	The steamship, a collier, ran aground on the Cross Sand, in the North Sea off the coast of Norfolk. She was refloated the next day with the assistance of tugs and beached at Gorleston, Suffolk. Her twenty crew were rescued. Norman was on a voyage from Newcastle upon Tyne to Alexandria, Egypt. She subsequently broke in two and was declared a total loss.

== 12 February ==
List of shipwrecks: 12 February 1881
Ship	State	Description
Antonia M, and Kilkerra	Italy; United Kingdom	The ships collided at Queenstown, County Cork and were both severely damaged.
John Green	United Kingdom	The schooner ran aground on the South Bull and was wrecked. Her crew were rescued. She was on a voyage from Drogheda, County Louth to Ayr.
Triumph	Norway	The barque collided with the barque Lewis Smith ( Canada) off Leith, Lothian, United Kingdom and was severely damaged. Triumph was on a voyage from Granton, Lothian to Demerara, British Guiana. She put in to Leith for repairs.
Zebu	Flag unknown	The ship was holed by a pile and sank at Manila, Spanish East Indies.

== 13 February ==
List of shipwrecks: 13 February 1881
Ship	State	Description
Flying Spur	United Kingdom	The clipper was wrecked on Martin Vas, North Rock, in the South Atlantic Ocean off the coast of the Cape Colony. All on board were rescued by the barque Château Lafitte (France). Flying Spur was on a voyage from Liverpool, Lancashire to Negapatam and Madras, India.
Hazard	United States	The ship ran aground on the Nantucket Shoal, off the coast of Massachusetts and was abandoned. Some of her crew were reported missing. She was on a voyage from Sierra Leone to Boston, Massachusetts.
Polly Pinkham	United Kingdom	The ship was driven ashore and wrecked at between Annestown and Stradbally, County Waterford with the loss of five of her seven crew. She was on a voyage from the Rio Grande to Liverpool.
Sylphide	France	The brigantine foundered and became a total wreck on the beach at Perranuthnoe, Cornwall. United Kingdom. Her crew were saved by the Prussia Cove rocket appartatus. She was on a voyage from Audierne, Finistère, to Cardiff, Glamorgan, United Kingdom.
T. F. Whiton	United States	The barque foundered at Praa Sands, Cornwall. Her crew were saved by the Prussia Cove rocket apparatus and the ship became a total loss after it caught fire. She was on a voyage from Victoria, British Columbia, Canada to London, United Kingdom.

== 14 February ==
List of shipwrecks: 14 February 1881
Ship	State	Description
Ann	United Kingdom	The brigantine was driven onto the Herd Sand, off the coast of County Durham. Her crew were rescued by rocket apparatus. She was on a voyage from Southampton, Hampshire to Sunderland, County Durham.
Cedar Croft	United Kingdom	The ship ran aground. She was on a voyage from Baltimore, Maryland, United States to Queenstown, County Cork. She was refloated.
Eliza Emma	United Kingdom	The brig was driven ashore near Hartlepool, County Durham. Her six crew were rescued by the Hartlepool Lifeboat John Clay ( Royal National Lifeboat Institution). She was on a voyage from Sunderland, County Durham to Shoreham-by-Sea, Sussex.
Gustaf Adolph	France	The ship ran aground. She was on a voyage from Baltimore, Maryland to Saint-Nazaire, Loire-Inférieure. She was refloated.
Matilda Hilyard	United Kingdom	The barque was driven ashore at Llanbedrog Point, Caernarfonshire. She was on a voyage from Greenock, Renfrewshire to Rio de Janeiro, Brazil.
Reaper	(United Kingdom of Great Britain and Ireland) Guernsey	The brigantine was driven onto the Herd Sand. Her crew were rescued by rocket apparatus. She was on a voyage from London to South Shields, County Durham.
Rebecca	United Kingdom	The Thames barge was run into by the steamship Meredith (United Kingdom) and sank in the River Thames at Rotherhithe, Surrey with the loss of one of her two crew.
Scotland	United Kingdom	The barque was driven ashore and wrecked at Ballymacar, County Wexford. Her crew were rescued. She was on a voyage from Cardiff, Glamorgan to Havana, Cuba.
Sylphide	France	The schooner was driven ashore and wrecked at Perran, Cornwall, United Kingdom. Her six crew were rescued by rocket apparatus. She was on a voyage from Nantes, Loire-Inférieure to Cardiff, Glamorgan, United Kingdom.

== 15 February ==
List of shipwrecks: 15 February 1881
Ship	State	Description
Tantallon	United Kingdom	The steamship ran aground in the Suez Canal. She was on a voyage from Calcutta, India to London. She was refloated and resumed her voyage.

== 16 February ==
List of shipwrecks: 16 February 1881
Ship	State	Description
Jennie M. Hammond	Canada	The ship was driven ashore at Halifax, Nova Scotia. She was on a voyage from Nevis to Halifax.

== 17 February ==
List of shipwrecks: 17 February 1881
Ship	State	Description
Kingston	United Kingdom	The steamship ran aground and was wrecked on the Shab Aly Reef, in the Red Sea. All bar seven of her crew were taken off. She was on a voyage from Cardiff, Glamorgan to Aden, Aden Colony. The remaining seven crew members were subsequently rescued and she was abandoned as a total loss.
Rose	United Kingdom	The ship was driven ashore and wrecked at "Scotston", near Peterhead, Aberdeenshire. She was on a voyage from Sunderland, County Durham to Aberdeen.

== 18 February ==
List of shipwrecks: 18 February 1881
Ship	State	Description
Caledonia	United Kingdom	The steamship was wrecked off Oyster Rock, just outside the harbour at Saint Helier, Jersey, Channel Islands. All on board survived. She was on a voyage from Southampton, Hampshire, to Guernsey, Sark, and Jersey.
Cobden, and Lamperts	United Kingdom	The steamships collided in the River Tees and were both severely damaged.
E. & M. J. Charmley	United Kingdom	The schooner was driven into George's Landing Stage, Liverpool, Lancashire and was severely damaged. She was towed off by the ferry Eastham Fairy and the tugs Rover and Tiger (all United Kingdom).
Foyle Packet	United Kingdom	The schooner was driven ashore at Stackpole Head, Pembrokeshire. Her crew were rescued. She was on a voyage from Gothenburg, Sweden to Newry, County Antrim.
Glaucus	United Kingdom	The steamship ran ashore at the Shakespeare Cliff, Dover, Kent. She was on a voyage from Shanghai, China to London.
Glaucus, and Gwendoline	United Kingdom	The steamships both ran aground at Grangemouth, Stirlingshire. Glaucus was towing Gwendoline from Port Edgar, Lothian to Grangemouth.
Glenorgum	United Kingdom	The steamship ran aground on the Maplin Sand, in the North Sea off the coast of Essex. She was refloated on 26 February.
International	United Kingdom	The steamship ran aground off Veracruz, Mexico. She was later refloated and taken in to New Orleans, Louisiana, United States for repairs.
Margaret Grace	United Kingdom	The ship ran aground on the Long Rock, off Ballywalter, County Down. She was on a voyage from Liverpool to Sandhead, Wigtownshire.
Robert and Mary	United Kingdom	The ketch struck a sunken wreck off Cley-next-the-Sea, Norfolk. She put in to Great Yarmouth, Norfolk in a leaky condition.
Rosalie	Germany	The schooner was driven ashore and wrecked at Port Alfred, Cape Colony. Her crew were rescued.
Thomas Adam	United Kingdom	The steamship ran aground on the Goodwin Sands, Kent. She was on a voyage from South Shields, County Durham to Almería, Spain. She was refloated and taken in to The Downs.

== 19 February ==
List of shipwrecks: 19 February 1881
Ship	State	Description
Isabella	United Kingdom	The smack was driven from her anchors in the Kingroad. She drove against the quayside and sank.
Jesse Rhnas	United States	The brig was stranded on the East Pensacola Bar on Santa Rosa Island, Florida at the entrance to Pensacola Bay.
Justine	Belgium	The fishing sloop was run down and sunk by the steamship Phœnix (United Kingdom) off the West Hinder Sandbank, in the North Sea. Two of her crew were rescued, others were reported missing.
Lady Anne	United Kingdom	The ship ran aground at Whitby, Yorkshire. Her crew were rescued. She was on a voyage from West Hartlepool, County Durham to Whitby.

== 20 February ==
List of shipwrecks: 20 February 1881
Ship	State	Description
Clytie	United Kingdom	The steamship was wrecked off the coast of Essex. Her sixteen crew took to two boats, which were towed in to Harwich by the smack Concord (United Kingdom). Clytie was on a voyage from Newcastle upon Tyne, Northumberland to Tarragona, Spain.
James Dale	United Kingdom	The ship was destroyed by fire in the Atlantic Ocean (33°56′N 48°16′W). Her crew were rescued by the barque Mabor (Norway). James Dale was on a voyage from Doboy, Georgia, United States to Queenstown, County Cork or Falmouth, Cornwall.

== 21 February ==
List of shipwrecks: 21 February 1881
Ship	State	Description
Batavia I	Netherlands	The steamship was driven ashore at Oude-Tonge, Zeeland. She was refloated and towed in to Antwerp, Belgium in a severely leaky condition.
Doris	United Kingdom	The schooner was run down and sunk in the Belfast Lough by the steamship Thomas Dugdale (United Kingdom). Her crew were rescued. Doris was on a voyage from Belfast, County Antrim to Fleetwood, Lancashire. She was refloated in early March and beached on the Holywood Bank.
Exhibition	United Kingdom	The ship foundered in the North Sea off the coast of Kincardineshire.
Flamingo	United Kingdom	The ship collided with a jetty at Charlton, Kent and ran aground. She was severely damaged.
Tasso	United Kingdom	The schooner collided with the steamship Telegraphic (United Kingdom) and was abandoned in the North Channel with the loss of her captain. Survivors were rescued by Telegraphic. Tasso was on a voyage from Runcorn, Cheshire to Newcastle upon Tyne, Northumberland. She was towed in to Larne, County Antrim on 25 February.

== 22 February ==
List of shipwrecks: 22 February 1881
Ship	State	Description
Alma	France	The ship was wrecked at "Lamala", Spain. She was on a voyage from Marseille, Bouche-du-Rhône to Saint-Malo, Ille-et-Vilaine.
Electra	United Kingdom	The schooner was run into in the River Tay by the steamship London (United Kingdom) and was severely damaged. Electra was on a voyage from Dundee, Forfarshire to Amble, Northumberland. She put back to Dundee for repairs.
Georgina	United Kingdom	The schooner ran ashore on the rocks off Porthoustock, Cornwall. Her crew attracted attention by lighting a tar-barrel; they were rescued by the Porthoustock Lifeboat. She was on a voyage from London to Cork. Georgina was on a voyage from London to Cork. She was subsequently destroyed by fire.
Harton, and Violet	United Kingdom	The steamships collided in the River Tyne at North Shields, Northumberland and were both severely damaged.
Isabel	Flag unknown	The brigantine was wrecked at Peter's River, Newfoundland Colony. She was on a voyage from Pernambuco, Brazil to Saint John's, Newfoundland Colony.
Oscar	United Kingdom	The schooner ran aground on the Abertay Sands, in the River Tay, and sank. Her crew were rescued by the Dundee Lifeboat. She was on a voyage from Saint Feliu de Guíxols, Spain to Dundee.
Susie May	United Kingdom	The ship ran aground in the River Mersey and was damaged. She was on a voyage from Runcorn, Cheshire to Rotterdam, South Holland, Netherlands.

== 23 February ==
List of shipwrecks: 23 February 1881
Ship	State	Description
Bavelaw	United Kingdom	The ship was abandoned in the Atlantic Ocean. Her nineteen crew were rescued by the steamship Austuriano (Flag unknown). Bavelaw was on a voyage from New York, United States to London.
Indus	United Kingdom	The ship ran aground at Garston, Lancashire. She was on a voyage from Pomaron, Portugal to Liverpool, Lancashire. She was refloated the next day and taken in to Liverpool.
Oakworth	United Kingdom	The steamship ran aground off the coast of China. She was on a voyage from Antwerp, Belgium to Shanghai, China.
P. C. Petersen	Norway	The barque was towed in to Havre de Grâce, Seine-Inférieure, France by the tug Scotia (Flag unknown), being severely leaky.
Sallie	Flag unknown	The steamship ran aground on the Banjaard Sand, in the North Sea off the coast of Zeeland. She was on a voyage from Bilbao, Spain to Rotterdam, South Holland, Netherlands She was refloated.
Unnamed	Flag unknown	The schooner was driven ashore and caught fire at Porthoustock, Cornwall, United Kingdom. Her crew were rescued by the Porthoustock Lifeboat.

== 24 February ==
List of shipwrecks: 24 February 1881
Ship	State	Description
Eliser Bru	Norway	The brigantine was run into in the Atlantic Ocean 50 nautical miles (93 km) west south west of The Lizard, Cornwall, United Kingdom by Carlise Castle (United Kingdom). Her eight crew were rescued by Carlisle Castle, they were landed on the Isles of Scilly the following day. Eliser Bru was on a voyage from St. Ubes, Portugal to Stavanger. She was subsequently towed in to the Isles of Scilly by the steamship Thames.
India	United Kingdom	The full-rigged ship was abandoned in the Atlantic Ocean. Her crew were rescued by the barque Bells (United Kingdom). India was on a voyage from Barrow-in-Furness, Lancashire to Port Pirie, South Australia.
Mary and Ann	United Kingdom	The ship departed from Leven, Fife for Ipswich, Suffolk. No further trace, reported overdue.
Perseverance	United Kingdom	The fishing trawler was run down and sunk in the Irish Sea by the steamship Captain Cook (United Kingdom).

== 25 February ==
List of shipwrecks: 25 February 1881
Ship	State	Description
Acacia	United Kingdom	The steamship ran aground in the Castletown River. She was on a voyage from Glasgow, Renfrewshire to Dundalk, County Louth. She was refloated and taken in to Dundalk.
Clutha	United Kingdom	The steamship was driven ashore in the River Tees.
Liverpool	United States	The ship was abandoned in the Atlantic Ocean. Her crew were rescued by the barque Valkyrien (Norway). Liverpool was on a voyage from New York to Bordeaux, Gironde, France.
Malleable	United Kingdom	The steamship was driven ashore in the River Tees.

== 26 February ==
List of shipwrecks: 26 February 1881
Ship	State	Description
German Emperor	United Kingdom	The steamship was damaged by ice in the Elbe. She was on a voyage from Newcastle upon Tyne, Northumberland to Hamburg, Germany.
Gertrude	Netherlands	The steamship collided with the steamship Carbon (United Kingdom) and sank in the North Sea off Souter Point, Northumberland. Her crew were rescued by Carbon. Gertrude was on a voyage from Sunderland, County Durham to Aberdeen, United Kingdom.
Royal Dane	United Kingdom	The steamship was damaged by ice in the Elbe. She was on a voyage from Spain to Hamburg.
Southmoor	United Kingdom	The steamship was damaged by ice in the Elbe. She was on a voyage from Newcastle upon Tyne to Hamburg.
Tasso	United Kingdom	The steamship was damaged by ice in the Elbe. She was on a voyage from Newcastle upon Tyne to Hamburg.

== 27 February ==
List of shipwrecks: 27 February 1881
Ship	State	Description
Moderator	United Kingdom	The sloop was run down and sunk in the River Usk by the steamship Harley (United Kingdom). Her crew were rescued.

== 28 February ==
List of shipwrecks: 28 February 1881
Ship	State	Description
Arab	United Kingdom	The schooner was driven ashore in Hartlepool Bay. Her crew were rescued. She was on a voyage from London to West Hartlepool, County Durham.
Astronom	Germany	The steamship ran aground in the Elbe at Schulau. She was on a voyage from Hamburg to Antwerp, Belgium. She was refloated and towed in to Hamburg in a severely leaky condition.
Ocean Maid	United Kingdom	The schooner ran aground on the Christchurch Ledge, in the English Channel off Christchurch, Hampshire. She was on a voyage from Caernarfon to London. She was refloated.
Pengouin	France	The barque was driven ashore at Cabo de Gata, Spain. Her crew were rescued.
Taurida	Flag unknown	The steamship ran aground in the River Ouse near Goole, Yorkshire, United Kingdom. She was on a voyage from Santander, Spain to Goole. She was refloated on 1 March and taken in to Goole.
Una	United Kingdom	The schooner foundered off Rockabill, County Dublin. Her crew were rescued.
Valentine	Flag unknown	The ship struck Cidera, off Cádiz, Spain and sprang a severe leak. She was on a voyage from Réunion to Cádiz.

== Unknown date ==
List of shipwrecks: Unknown date in February 1881
Ship	State	Description
Adriana	Canada	The ship was driven ashore at Galveston, Texas, United States. Her crew were rescued. She was on a voyage from Galveston to Liverpool, Lancashire, United Kingdom.
Æmulatic	United Kingdom	The barque capsized in the Atlantic Ocean before 21 February with the loss of all nine crew. She was on a voyage from British Honduras to Greenock, Renfrewshire.
Anna G	Austria-Hungary	The barque was abandoned at sea. Her crew were rescued. She was on a voyage from Cette, Hérault, France to Boston, Massachusetts, United States.
Argo	United Kingdom	The steamship ran aground on the Mellieplaat. She was on a voyage from Antwerp, Belgium to Hull, Yorkshire. She was refloated and resumed her voyage.
Aruba	United Kingdom	The ship was driven ashore at Goswick, Northumberland before 11 February. She became a wreck on that day.
August	Germany	The barque was wrecked at Saint-Jean-du-Luz, Basses-Pyrénées, France. Her crew were rescued.
Beatrice	United Kingdom	The ship was driven ashore at Cape Henlopen, Delaware. She was on a voyage from Newcastle upon Tyne, Northumberland to Philadelphia, Pennsylvania, United States. She was refloated and taken in to the Delaware Breakwater in a leaky condition.
Bella	France	The schooner was driven ashore and wrecked at Saint-Marie, Martinique.
Bella Donna	United Kingdom	The schooner ran aground on The Brambles, in the Solent. She was on a voyage from Scotland to Eling, Hampshire. She was refloated and resumed her voyage.
Boomtide	United Kingdom	The steamship sank off Sunderland, County Durham. Eighteen of the crew was saved by the lifeboat Florence Nightingale ( Royal National Lifeboat Institution).
British Empire	United Kingdom	The ship was driven ashore on the east coast of the United States.
Calliope	Greece	The steamship was driven ashore west of Dunkirk, Nord, France. She was on a voyage from the Black Sea to Dunkirk.
Caribou	United States	The ship was driven ashore in the Schuylkill River. She was on a voyage from Philadelphia, Pennsylvania to Veracruz, Mexico.
City of London	United Kingdom	The steamship was driven ashore at "Halifax, United States" She was on a voyage from New York to London. She was refloated on 17 February and resumed her voyage.
County of Argyle	United Kingdom	The ship was driven ashore on Dove Island, Netherlands East Indies. She was refloated and put in to Banjoewanjie, Netherlands East Indies.
Criterion	United States	The ship was driven ashore at Sandy Hook, New Jersey. She was on a voyage from New York to Bremen, Germany. She was refloated on 5 February and resumed her voyage.
Criterion	United Kingdom	The brig was wrecked at Saint-Jean-de-Luz. Her crew were rescued.
Danmark	Sweden	The steamship was severely damaged by ice in the Baltic Sea and was abandoned in a sinking condition. Her crew were rescued.
David and Kate	United Kingdom	The schooner was sunk by ice at "Vogeland", Germany. Her crew survived. shew as on a voyage from Hamburg, Germany to Cork.
Diligentia	United Kingdom	The barque was driven ashore near the mouth of the River Avon. She was on a voyage from Savannah, Georgia, United States to Penarth, Glamorgan. She was refloated and completed her voyage.
Edith Morgan	United Kingdom	The ship was driven ashore and wrecked in the Sound of Islay.
Embla	Norway	The derelict ship was towed in to Arendal.
Emma	United Kingdom	The schooner ran aground on the Oxwich Sands, in the Bristol Channel off the coast of Glamorgan.
Era	(United Kingdom of Great Britain and Ireland) Guernsey	The barquentine was wrecked on the Haisborough Sands, in the North Sea off the coast of Norfolk.
Fairy Queen	United Kingdom	The ship was wrecked on Nossi Be, Merina Kingdom. She was on a voyage from Bushire, Persia to Port Elizabeth, Cape Colony.
Flaminian	United Kingdom	The steamship was driven ashore on Ibiza, Spain. She was on a voyage from Liverpool to Genoa, Italy. She was refloated on 12 February and resumed her voyage.
Fortuna	United Kingdom	The ship was driven ashore in Luce Bay. Her crew survived. She was on a voyage from Dublin to Glasgow, Renfrewshire.
Frankfurt Hall	United Kingdom	The barque was destroyed by fire at sea. Her crew were rescued by Glenboyn (United Kingdom). Frankfurt Hall was on a voyage from the River Mersey to Valparaíso, Chile.
Gabrielle	France	The ship was driven ashore near Swansea, Glamorgan. She was on a voyage from Havre de Grâce, Seine-Inférieure to Bridgwater, Somerset, United Kingdom.
General Zaragora	Mexico	The steamship was driven ashore and wrecked at San Blas.
Gottfried	Germany	The ship was driven ashore on Saint Lucia. She was a total loss.
Gustav	Sweden	The schooner was wrecked on Ameland, Friesland, Netherlands. Her crew were rescued. She was on a voyage from Lisbon, Portugal to Harlingen, Friesland.
Harry See	United States	The schooner was lost near Pensacola, Florida.
H. H. Wright	United States	The ship was driven ashore at "False Hook". She was on a voyage from New York to Buenos Aires, Argentina.
Holly	United Kingdom	The steamship ran ashore on Piel Island, Lancashire. She was refloated and taken in to Morecambe.
Imbros	United Kingdom	The steamship was driven ashore at Charleston, South Carolina, United States. She was on a voyage from Charleston to Sevastopol, Russia.
Isabel	United Kingdom	The ship was lost in Peter's River, Newfoundland Colony with the loss of all hands.
Italo	Flag unknown	The ship was wrecked at Damiette, Egypt. She was on a voyage from Marseille, Bouches-du-Rhône, France to Port Said, Egypt.
James A. Mark	United States	The ship was driven ashore at Holland Point, Maryland. She was on a voyage from Rio de Janeiro, Brazil to Baltimore, Maryland. She was refloated and taken in to Baltimore.
Johanna	Netherlands	The brigantine was driven ashore and wrecked at Port Elizabeth. Her crew were rescued. She was on a voyage from Rosario, Argentina to Port Elizabeth.
Johanna H. Cann	(Canada)	The ship was driven ashore at Cape Henry, Virginia, United STates. She was on a voyage from Antwerp to the Hampton Roads, Virginia. She was declared a total loss.
Johan Theodore	Netherlands	The ship ran aground off Makassar, Netherlands East Indies. She was refloated and towed in to Surabaya, Netherlands East Indies for repairs.
John Kendall	United Kingdom	The brig struck the Fishing-ridge Rock and sank in Cloughey Bay with the loss of three of her eight crew. Survivors reached the Lighthouse Rock, from where they were rescued by a yawl. She was on a voyage from Greenock, Renfrewshire to Barbados.
Joseph Legal	France	The ship was lost at sea. Her crew were rescued. She was on a voyage from Cádiz, Spain to Dieppe, Seine-Inférieure.
J. P. Taylor	United Kingdom	The steamship ran aground in the Vlie. She was on a voyage from Harlingen, Friesland to the River Tyne. She was refloated two days later and resumed her voyage.
Jubilee	United Kingdom	The barque was run into by the steamship Salerno (United Kingdom). Several of her crew got aboard Salerno. Jubilee drove ashore at Cleethorpes, Lincolnshire. There was no loss of life.
Kedron	United Kingdom	The barque collided with a steamship and was severely damaged. She was on a voyage from Havre de Grâce to Baltimore, Maryland, United States. She completed her voyage.
Kordima	United Kingdom	The steamship was driven ashore on the coast of New Jersey.
Landseer	United States	The ship ran aground in the River Liffey. She was on a voyage from San Francisco, California to Dublin.
Little Ross	United Kingdom	The schooner was driven ashore and wrecked at Bullers of Buchan, Aberdeenshire with the loss of four of her five crew. She was on a voyage from South Shields, County Durham to Inverness.
Lord Exmouth	United Kingdom	The ship was driven ashore at Spurn Point, Yorkshire. She was refloated on 17 January and towed in to Grimsby, Lincolnshire in a severely leaky condition.
Mandarin	Norway	The barque struck a rock off the Norwegian coast and put in to Farsund in a waterlogged condition. She was on a voyage from Fredrikstadt to Santander, Spain.
M. and E. Cann	Canada	The barque was driven ashore on Sharps Island, Massachusetts, United States. She was on a voyage from Baltimore, Maryland to Londonderry, United Kingdom. She was later refloated and towed in to Baltimore for repairs.
Marcellus	France	The brig was wrecked at Saint-Jean-de-Luz. Her crew were rescued.
Noi	Italy	The barque was driven ashore at Mitylene, Lesbos, Greece. She was on a voyage from Smyrna, Ottoman Empire to New York. She was refloated and resumed her voyage, but put in to Malta on 12 February in a leaky condition.
Ocean Lady	United Kingdom	The ship foundered with the loss of all hands, according to a message in a bottle that washed ashore at Weymouth, Dorset. Wreckage was discovered off Dover, Kent. She was on a voyage from London to Weymouth.
Ranger	United Kingdom	The barque was abandoned at sea. She was on a voyage from Darien, Georgia, United States to Amsterdam, North Holland, Netherlands.
Redowa	United States	The brig was wrecked near Passages, Spain. Her crew were rescyed by the steamship Alverton (United Kingdom). Redowa was on a voyage from Savannah, Georgia to Santander, Spain.
Rosalia Starita	Italy	The barque was driven ashore at Cape Henry. She was on a voyage from Catania, Sicily to Baltimore. She was refloated with the assistance of some steamships.
Rosebud	United Kingdom	The brigantine was driven ashore and wrecked at Portland, Dorset. Her crew were rescued.
Sabra	Canada	The ship sank at "Socoa". She was on a voyage from New York to Havre de Grâce.
Saphir	Norway	The ship was driven ashore at the Rammekens Castle, Zeeland, Netherlands. She was refloated on 9 February.
Shamrock	United Kingdom	The smack was driven ashore at Bacton, Norfolk.
St. Albans	United States	The steamboat was holed by ice and sank in the Milwaukee River 12 nautical miles (22 km) from Milwaukee, Wisconsin with the loss of one of the 25 people on board. Survivors reached shore in four boats.
Star of India	United Kingdom	The ship was driven ashore at Hunters Point, New York. She was on a voyage from New York to London. She was later refloated and assisted in to Weehawken, New Jersey in a waterlogged condition.
Topaze	France	The steamship caught fire at Havre de Grâce. The fire was extinguished.
Union	United Kingdom	The ship capsized in the River Thames. She was beached at Plaistow, Essex.
Utrecht	Netherlands	The steamship ran aground off "Zuiden". She was refloated and resumed her voyage.
Velos	United States	The ship was wrecked in the Squan Inlet. She was on a voyage from Ponce, Puerto Rico to New York.
William J. Stairs	United States	The ship ran aground on the Schooner Ledge. She was on a voyage from Philadelphia to Dublin. She was refloated and put in to Marcus Hook, Philadelphia.
Unnamed vessel	Flag unknown	The ship was wrecked in Hoblyn's Cove, St Agnes, Cornwall, United Kingdom.
Unnamed	Flag unknown	The ship was driven ashore on the Jordan Flats, in Liverpool Bay.
