= Murphy Bay =

Bay in Antarctica

Murphy Bay (67°42′S 146°19′E) is a bay 7 nautical miles (13 km) wide between Penguin Point and Cape Bage. Discovered by the Australasian Antarctic Expedition (1911–1914) under Douglas Mawson, who named it for Herbert D. Murphy, a member of the expedition.
