= USS Penguin =

USS Penguin has been the name of three United States Navy ships:

- USS Penguin (1861), a steamer purchased at New York on 23 May 1861 which served in the U.S. Navy until 1865.
- USS Penguin (AM-33), a minesweeper laid down 17 November 1917 at the New Jersey Dry Dock and Transportation Co., Elizabethport, New Jersey which served in the U.S. Navy from 1918 to 1941.
- USS Penguin (ASR-12), a submarine rescue vessel laid down as USS Chetco (AT-99) by the Charleston Shipbuilding and Dry Dock Co., Charleston, South Carolina, 9 February 1943, and commissioned in 1944.

== See also ==
- Penguin (disambiguation)
- USFS Penguin, a United States Bureau of Fisheries ship in commission from 1930 to 1940
- US FWS Penguin, a United States Fish and Wildlife Service ship in commission from 1940 to 1950
- US FWS Penguin II, a United States Fish and Wildlife Service ship in commission from 1950 to 1963
