= Southern Cross Subglacial Highlands =

Landform in Antarctica

Southern Cross Subglacial Highlands (71°0′S 147°0′E) is a group of subglacial highlands located east of Webb Subglacial Trench in the north end of Wilkes Subglacial Basin. The feature was delineated by the Scott Polar Research Institute (SPRI)-National Science Foundation (NSF)-Technical University of Denmark (TUD) airborne radio echo sounding program, 1967–79, and was named after the Southern Cross, the expedition ship of British Antarctic Expedition, 1898–1900, led by Carsten Borchgrevink.
