= Eric Webb =

Member of the Australasian Antarctic Expedition

Eric Webb DSO MC
- Born: 23 November 1889; Christchurch, New Zealand
- Died: 23 January 1984 (aged 94); Caterham, Surrey, England
- Education: University of Canterbury
- Occupations: Engineer, Antarctic explorer, military officer
- Known for: Chief magnetician, Australasian Antarctic Expedition
- Awards: Polar Medal (1915)
- Military career
- Allegiance: Australia
- Branch: Australian Imperial Force
- Service years: 1915–1919
- Rank: Major
- Conflicts: First World War
- Awards: Distinguished Service Order; Military Cross; Mentioned in Despatches (2)

Eric Norman Webb, DSO, MC (23 November 1889 – 23 January 1984) was an engineer known for his role as chief magnetician on the Australasian Antarctic Expedition.

== Biography ==
Eric Norman Webb was born in Christchurch, New Zealand, on 23 November 1889. He studied civil engineering at the University of Canterbury and worked at the Melbourne Observatory, carrying out observations for the Carnegie Institution for Science.

At age 22 he was selected as chief magnetician on Douglas Mawson's Australasian Antarctic Expedition. Part of his role while based at Cape Denison was to take daily measurements from the Magnetograph House, which he carried out regardless of the sometimes difficult conditions. He took part in a sledging journey with Edward Frederick Robert Bage and Frank Hurley to the South Magnetic Pole, a round trip of 960 kilometres (600 mi). Both Cape Webb and Webb Subglacial Trench are named after him.

Webb served in the Australian Imperial Force during the First World War. He enlisted in the 7th Field Company Engineers and embarked from Sydney on 30 November 2015 on board HMAT A23 Suffolk. He was awarded the Military Cross (MC), Distinguished Service Order, 1914–15 Star, British War Medal and Victory Medal, and was twice mentioned in despatches. The citation for his MC, appearing in The London Gazette in February 1919, reads as follows:

During operations near Peronne from the 29th to 31st August, 1918, he displayed the greatest courage, skill, and powers of leadership and organisation in constructing and repairing bridges for crossing the Somme, under continuous shell and machine-gun fire. He also carried out valuable reconnaissances on water supply and roads up to the front line to assist the advance, and throughout this period his untiring efforts and determination contributed in a large measure to the success of the operations.

Webb later worked in hydroelectric projects including the Churchill Falls Generating Station (then known as Hamilton Falls) in Labrador, Canada. He visited Australia in 1974 and was interviewed by ABC Television about his role in the Australasian Antarctic Expedition.

Eric Webb was the last surviving member of the Australasian Antarctic Expedition. He died on 23 January 1984.
