= HMAS Penguin =

Three ships and two shore installations of the Royal Australian Navy have been named HMAS Penguin after the aquatic, flightless bird:

- HMAS Penguin (1913), a composite sloop originally commissioned by the Royal Navy, before being transferred to the RAN in 1913 as a depot ship
- HMAS Penguin, a second-class protected cruiser, HMAS Encounter, was renamed Penguin in 1923 when it was converted to accommodations
- HMAS Penguin, a submarine depot ship HMS Platypus built for the Royal Navy before being transferred to the RAN as HMAS Platypus in 1919 and renamed Penguin in 1929. The ship was renamed Platypus in 1941.
- HMAS Penguin, the Royal Australian Navy's primary naval base on the east coast of Australia, located on Garden Island in Sydney, was known as HMAS Penguin until it was renamed HMAS Kuttabul in January 1943.
- HMAS Penguin (naval base), one of the RAN's major training establishments, is located in Balmoral, New South Wales.

Three other bases were established as subordinate to the Garden Island base. These were also given the name HMAS Penguin, but with a Roman numeral suffix added:

- HMAS Penguin II, naval base at Balmoral, New South Wales, until renamed HMAS Penguin in January 1943
- HMAS Penguin III, a Naval depot in Newcastle, which was subsequently commissioned as HMAS Maitland on 1 August 1940
- HMAS Penguin IV, a Naval depot in Darwin, was commissioned in September 1939, and subsequently commissioned as HMAS Melville on 1 August 1940

== See also ==
- Penguin (disambiguation)
- HMS Penguin
