= Penguin Island (Tasmania) =

Island in Tasmania, Australia

Coordinates: 41°09′S 146°33′E

Penguin Island is a small island, with an area of 2.73 ha, part of the North Coast Group, lying in the southern Bass Strait near Devonport in north-west Tasmania. It is part of the Narawntapu National Park. An estimated 100 pairs of little penguins breed on the island.

== See also ==
- Penguin Islet (Tasmania)
