= HMS Penguin (1838) =

Brig of the Royal Navy

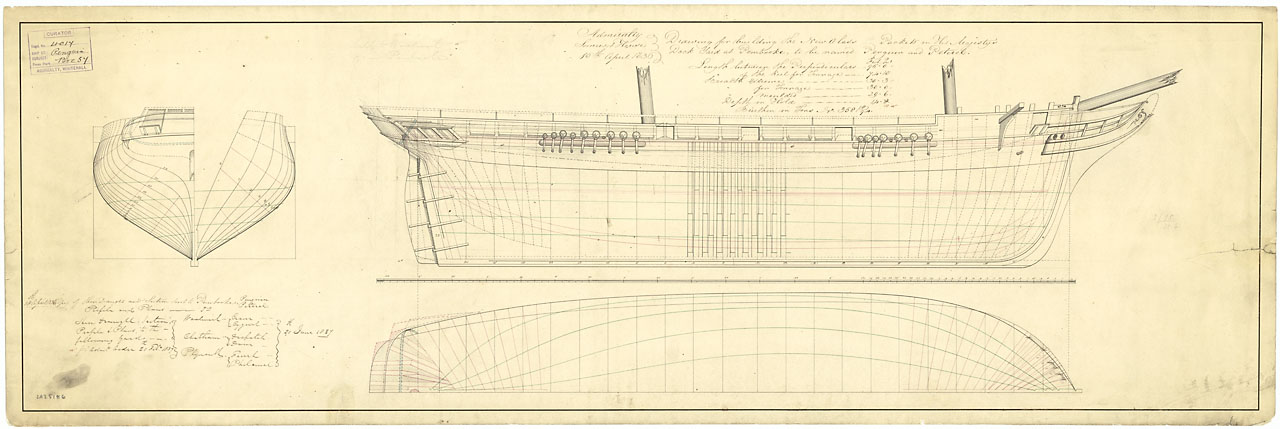
- Drawing of the Penguin, 1836

History

United Kingdom
- Name: Penguin
- Namesake: Penguin
- Ordered: 14 April 1836
- Builder: Pembroke Dockyard
- Laid down: November 1836
- Launched: 10 April 1838
- Completed: 21 September 1838
- Commissioned: 24 July 1838
- Renamed: As WV.31, 25 May 1863
- Fate: Sold for scrap, 5 June 1871

General characteristics
- Class & type: Alert-class brig
- Tons burthen: 360 4/94 bm
- Length: 95 ft (29.0 m) (Gun deck); 75 ft (22.9 m) (Keel)
- Beam: 30 ft 4 in (9.2 m)
- Draught: 10 ft 11 in (3.3 m)
- Depth: 14 ft 8 in (4.5 m)
- Complement: 44
- Armament: 2 × 6-pdr cannon; 4 × 12-pdr carronades

HMS Penguin was a six-gun Alert-class packet brig built for the Royal Navy during the 1830s.

== Description ==
Penguin had a length at the gundeck of 95 feet (29.0 m) and 75 feet (22.9 m) at the keel. She had a beam of 30 feet 4 inches (9.2 m), a draught of 10 feet 11 inches (3.3 m) and a depth of hold of 14 feet 8 inches (4.5 m). The ship's tonnage was 360 4/94 tons burthen. The Alert class was initially armed with a pair of 6-pounder cannon and four 12-pounder carronades. Later they were equipped with six 32-pounder or eight 18-pounder cannon. The ships had a crew of 44 officers and ratings.

== Construction and career ==
Penguin, the fourth ship of her name to serve in the Royal Navy, was ordered on 14 April 1836, laid down in November 1836 at Pembroke Dockyard, Wales, and launched on 10 April 1838. She was completed on 21 September 1838 at Plymouth Dockyard and commissioned on 24 July of that year.
