= Penguin River =

River in South Georgia and Sandwich Islands, United Kingdom

- Location of mouth

Location
- Continent: Antarctica
- Country: United Kingdom
- Territory: South Georgia and the South Sandwich Islands

Physical characteristics
- Source
  - location: Hamberg Lakes
- Mouth
  - location: Horse Head in Cumberland East Bay, South Georgia
  - coordinates: (54°17′S 36°30′W)

Basin features
- Progression: NE

Penguin River is a small meandering stream which flows in a general northeast direction from Hamberg Lakes to the coast close south of Horse Head in Cumberland East Bay, South Georgia. It was first surveyed by the Swedish Antarctic Expedition under Nordenskjold from 1901 to 1904, and was named by Carl Skottsberg, botanist with the expedition.
