= Webb Subglacial Trench =

Valley in Antarctica

Webb Subglacial Trench (70°0′S 146°0′E) is a subglacial trench in the northwest part of Wilkes Subglacial Basin, to the west of Southern Cross Subglacial Highlands, in East Antarctica. The feature was delineated by the Scott Polar Research Institute (SPRI)-National Science Foundation (NSF)-Technical University of Denmark (TUD) airborne radio echo sounding program, 1967–79, and named after Eric Webb (1890–1984), magnetician with the Australasian Antarctic Expedition, 1911-14 (Sir Douglas Mawson).
