= Penguin Point (George V Land) =

Rock Point Around George V Land, Antarctica

Penguin Point (67°39′00″S 146°12′00″E) is a rock point at the west side of the entrance to Murphy Bay. The point rises to 95 metres (312 ft) and marks the termination of a granite wall about 3 nautical miles (5.6 km) long. It was discovered and named in 1912 by the eastern coastal party led by Cecil T. Madigan of the Australasian Antarctic Expedition (1911–1914) under Douglas Mawson.
