= Doolette Bay =

Bay in Antarctica

Doolette Bay (67°55′S 147°0′E) is a bay in Antarctica lying at the junction of the western side of the Ninnis Glacier Tongue with the mainland. It was discovered by the Australasian Antarctic Expedition (1911–14) under Douglas Mawson, who named it after George Doolette of Adelaide, a patron of the expedition.
