= Ainsworth Bay, Antarctica =

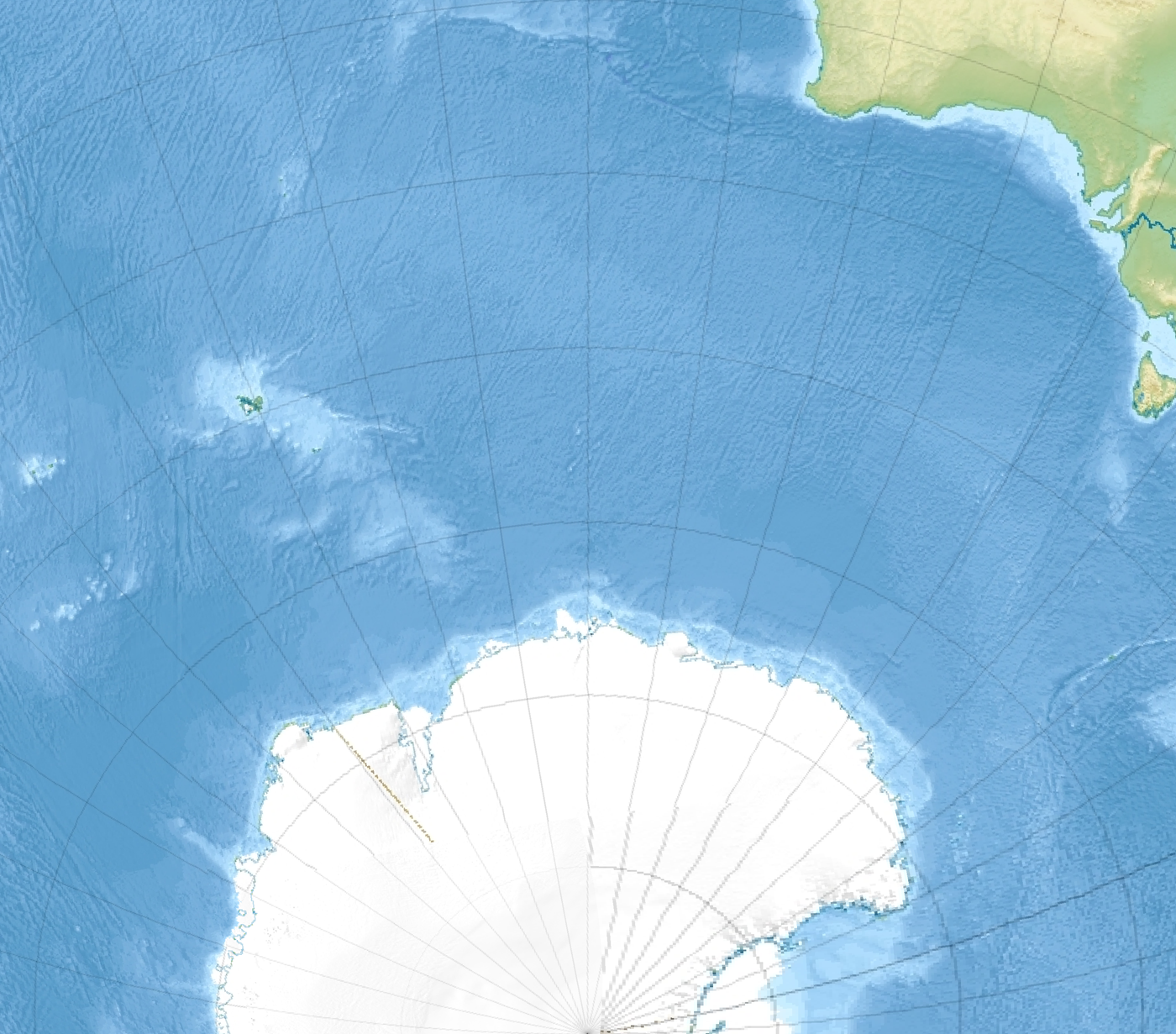
- Location within Antarctica Location within Subantarctic (Indian Ocean)
- Interactive map of Ainsworth Bay, Antarctica
- Location: George V Land
- Coordinates: 67°48′S 146°37′E
- Type: Bay
- Etymology: George Ainsworth
- Part of: Southern Ocean
- Basin countries: Antartica
- Managing agency: Australian Antarctic Territory
- Max. width: 8 kilometres (5.0 mi)
- Frozen: Year-round
- References: "Ainsworth Bay". Australian Antarctic Data Centre.

Ainsworth Bay is an ice-filled recession of the coastline, eight kilometres (five miles) wide, between Cape Bage and Cape Webb in Antarctica. Discovered by the Australasian Antarctic Expedition (1911–1914) under Douglas Mawson, and named by him for George Ainsworth, a member of the expedition who served as leader and meteorologist with the Australasian Antarctic Expedition party on Macquarie Island during 1911–1913.
