= SS Ridge Park =

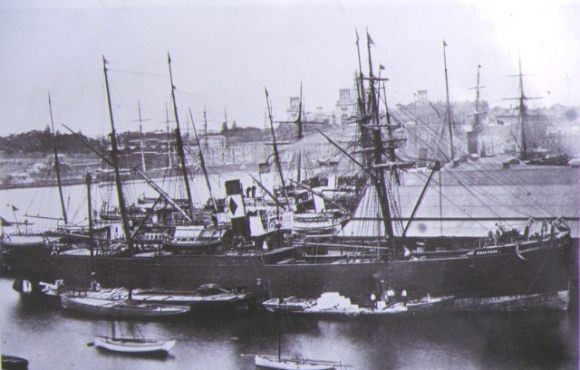

History
- Name: Ridge Park
- Builder: S. P. Austin & Co
- Homeport: Port Adelaide / Australia
- Fate: Sank on 10 February 1881

General characteristics
- Length: 214 ft 0 in (65 m); 214 ft (65 m)

SS Ridge Park was a steam ship built in 1878 in England and registered in Australia. It was used to transport coal, other goods and passengers by the Black Diamond Line of Adelaide. It sank on 10 February 1881 after hitting the Beware Reef, Cape Conran, Victoria, Australia.
