= Penguin Islet (Tasmania) =

Island in Tasmania, Australia

Coordinates: 40°35′S 144°49′E

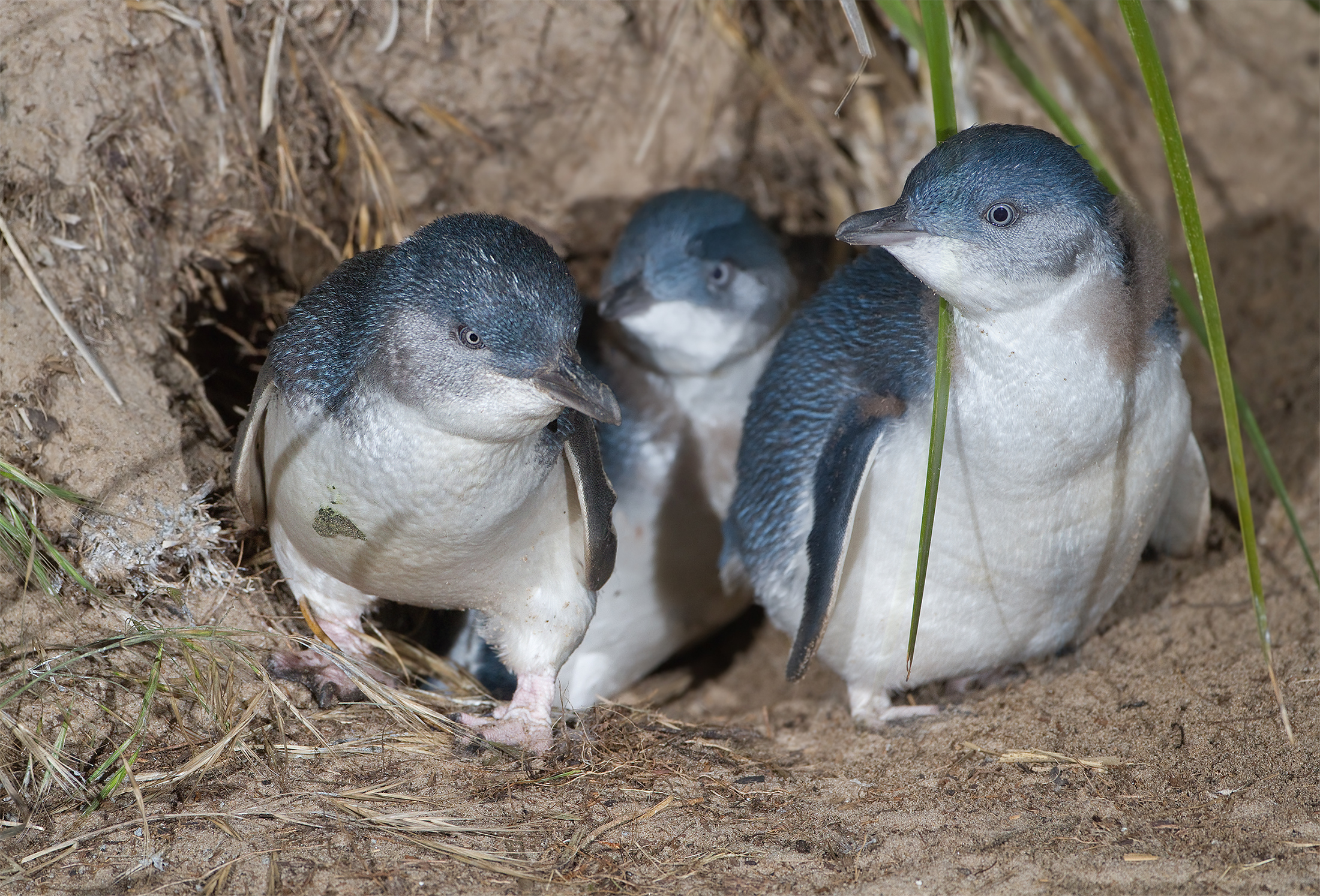
The island is a breeding site for penguins

Penguin Islet is a small island nature reserve with an area of 3.46 ha in Bass Strait, south-eastern Australia. It is part of Tasmania’s Hunter Island Group which lies between north-west Tasmania and King Island. It is notable as the only pelican colony in western Bass Strait.

== Fauna ==
The island forms part of the Hunter Island Group Important Bird Area. Breeding seabirds and shorebirds include little penguin, short-tailed shearwater, fairy prion, common diving-petrel, white-faced storm-petrel, Pacific gull, silver gull, sooty oystercatcher, black-faced cormorant, Australian pelican and Caspian tern.

== See also ==
- Penguin Island (Tasmania)
- Tasmania's offshore islands
