= Three Penguins =

Mountain in Utah, United States

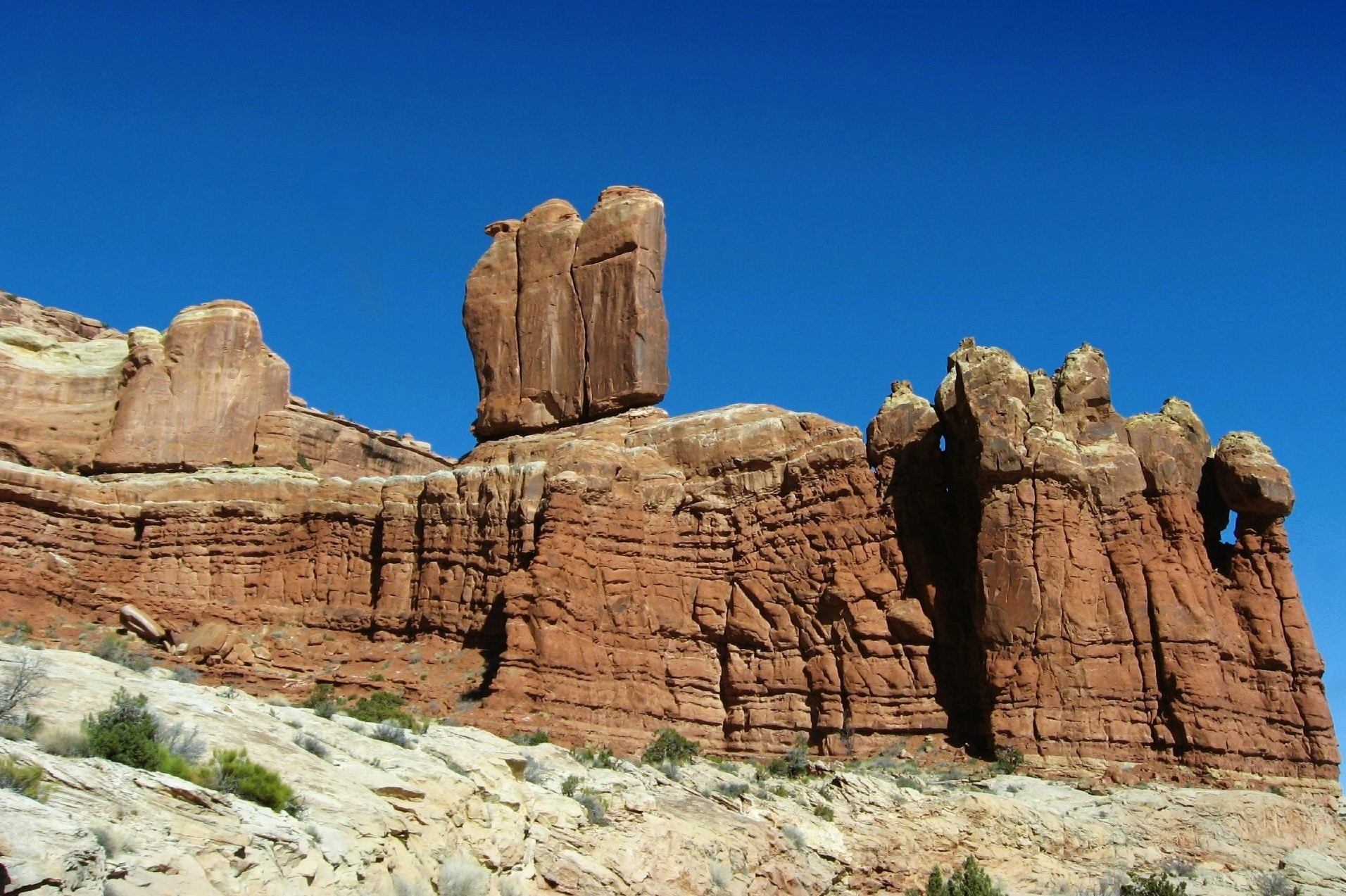
- West aspect

Highest point
- Elevation: 4,488 ft (1,368 m)
- Prominence: 120 ft (37 m)
- Isolation: 0.65 mi (1.05 km)
- Coordinates: 38°37′09″N 109°37′05″W

Geography
- Location within Utah Location within the United States
- Country: United States
- State: Utah
- County: Grand
- Protected area: Arches National Park
- Parent range: Colorado Plateau
- Topo map: USGS Moab

Geology
- Rock age: Jurassic
- Rock type: Entrada Sandstone

Climbing
- First ascent: 1976
- Easiest route: class 5.10a climbing

Three Penguins is a 4,488-foot-elevation (1,368-meter) summit in Grand County, Utah, United States.

== Description ==
Three Penguins is located within Arches National Park and it is the first notable rock feature to greet visitors as they enter the park on the main road. Like many of the rock formations in the park, it is composed of Entrada Sandstone, specifically the Slick Rock Member overlaying the Dewey Bridge Member. The tower is 140 feet tall, and topographic relief is significant as the summit rises 350 feet (107 meters) above Moab Canyon in 0.15 miles (0.24 km). Precipitation runoff from Three Penguins drains to the nearby Colorado River via Moab Canyon. This landform's descriptive toponym has been officially adopted by the United States Board on Geographic Names.

== Climbing ==
The first ascent of the summit was made in November 1976 by Larry Bruce, Molly Higgins, and Michael Kennedy via the class 5.10 Center Chimney.

Other rock-climbing routes on Three Penguins:

- Right Chimney - class 5.10+ - Michael Kennedy, Molly Higgins - (1976)
- Anorexia - class 5.10a - Alan Nelson, Alan Bartlett
- Petrified Bear's Dick - class 5.10 - Todd Gordon, Margie Floyd, Maryann Loehr - (1998)

The Right Chimney is considered one of the best rock-climbing routes in the park.

== Climate ==
According to the Köppen climate classification system, Three Penguins is located in a cold semi-arid climate zone with cold winters and hot summers. Spring and fall are the most favorable seasons to experience Arches National Park, when highs average 60 to 80 °F (15 to 25 °C) and lows average 30 to 50 °F (0 to 10 °C). Summer temperatures often exceed 100 °F (40 °C). Winters are cold, with highs averaging 30 to 50 °F (0 to 10 °C), and lows averaging 0 to 20 °F (−20 to −5 °C). As part of a high desert region, it can experience wide daily temperature fluctuations. The park receives an average of less than 10 inches (25 cm) of rain annually.

== See also ==
- Geology of Utah

== Gallery ==
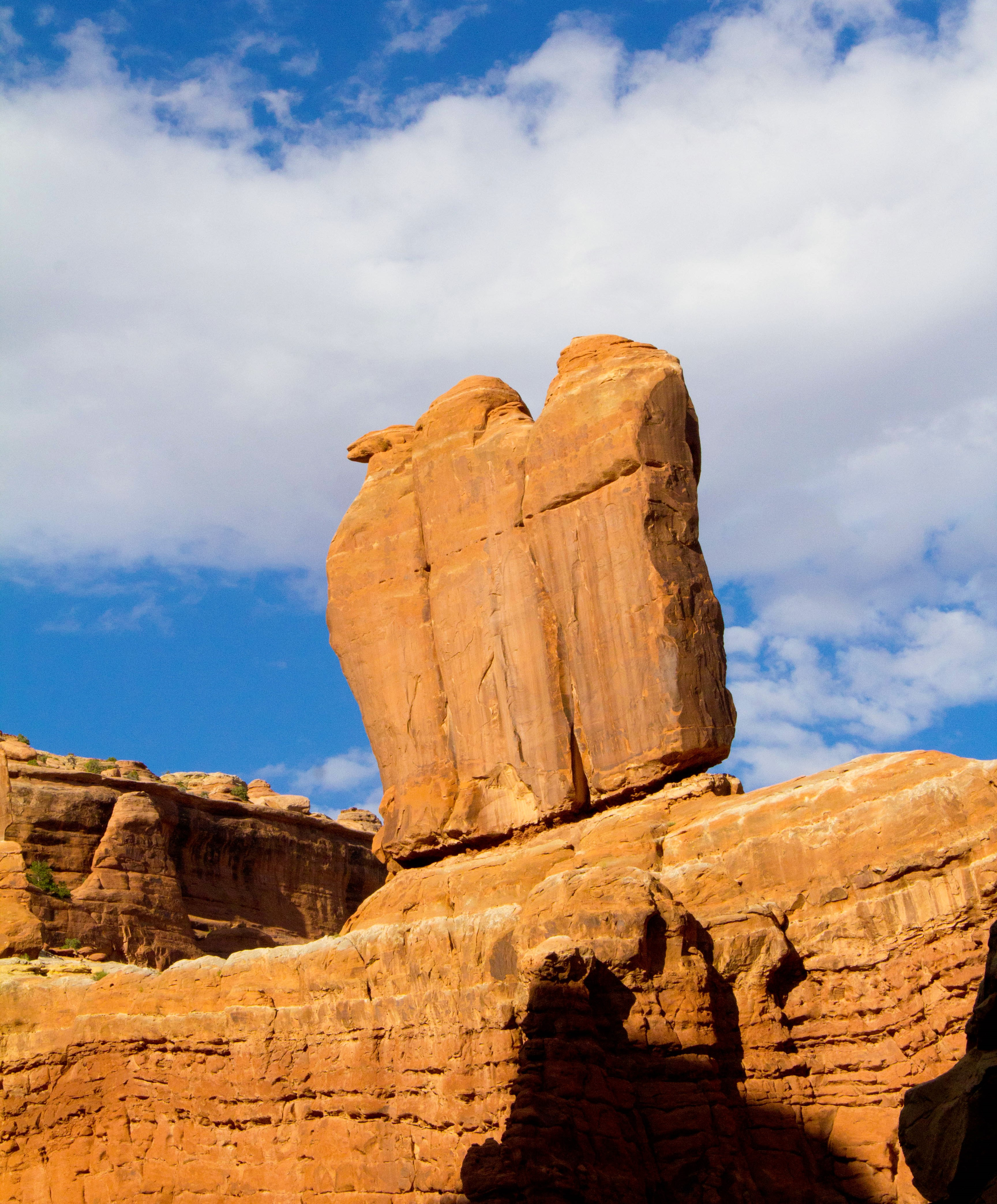
West aspect

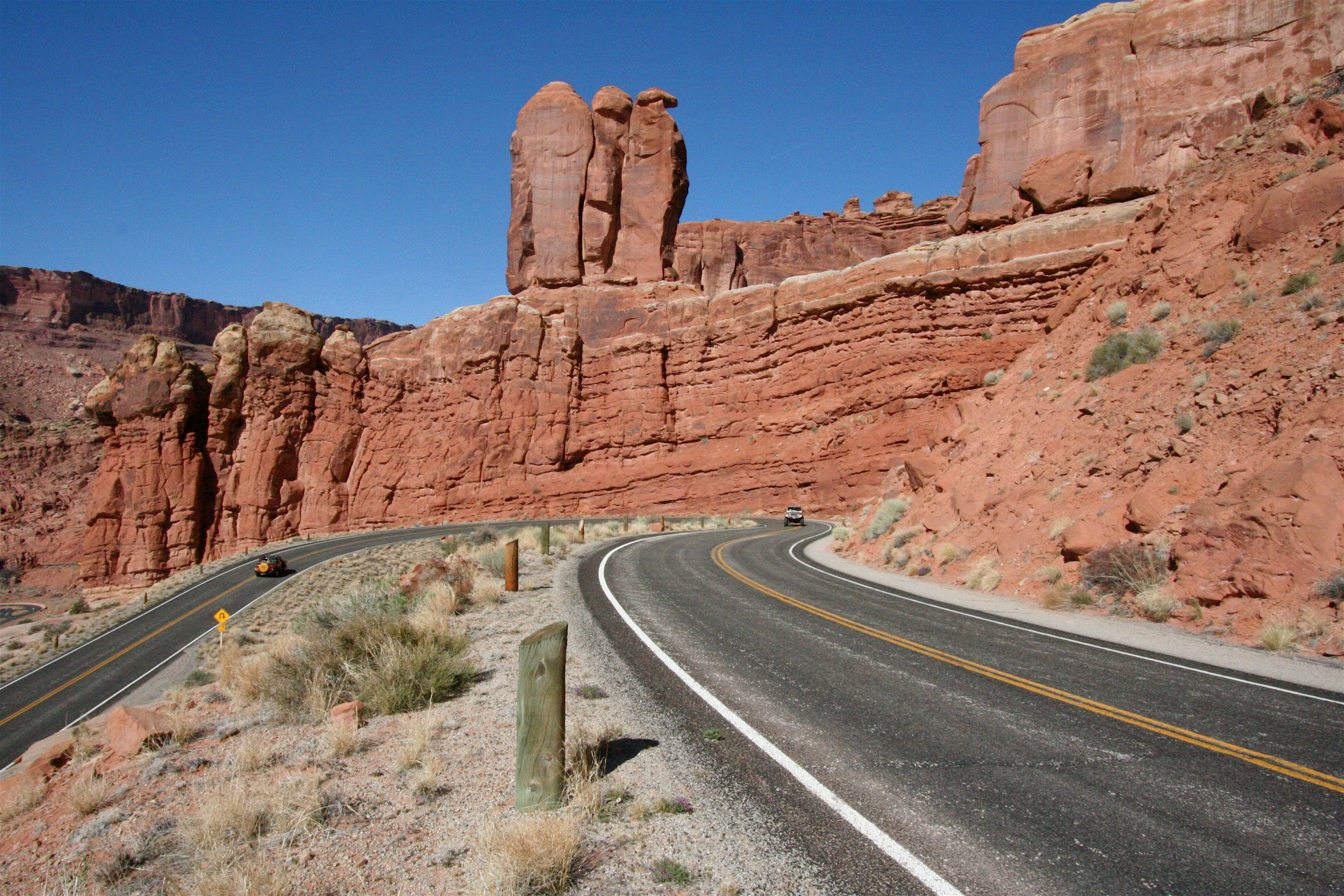
East aspect

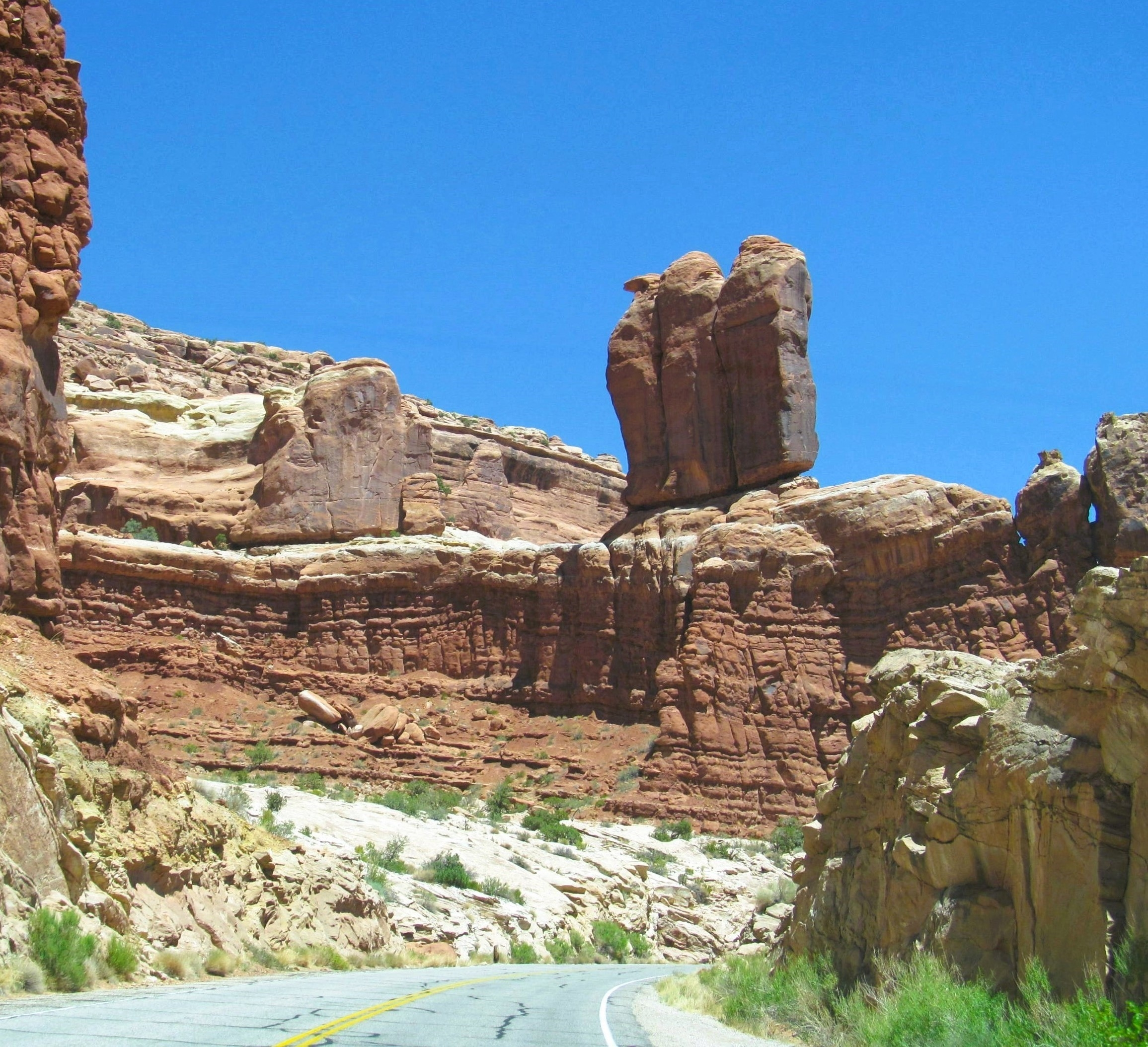
Three Penguins from Arches National Park Road

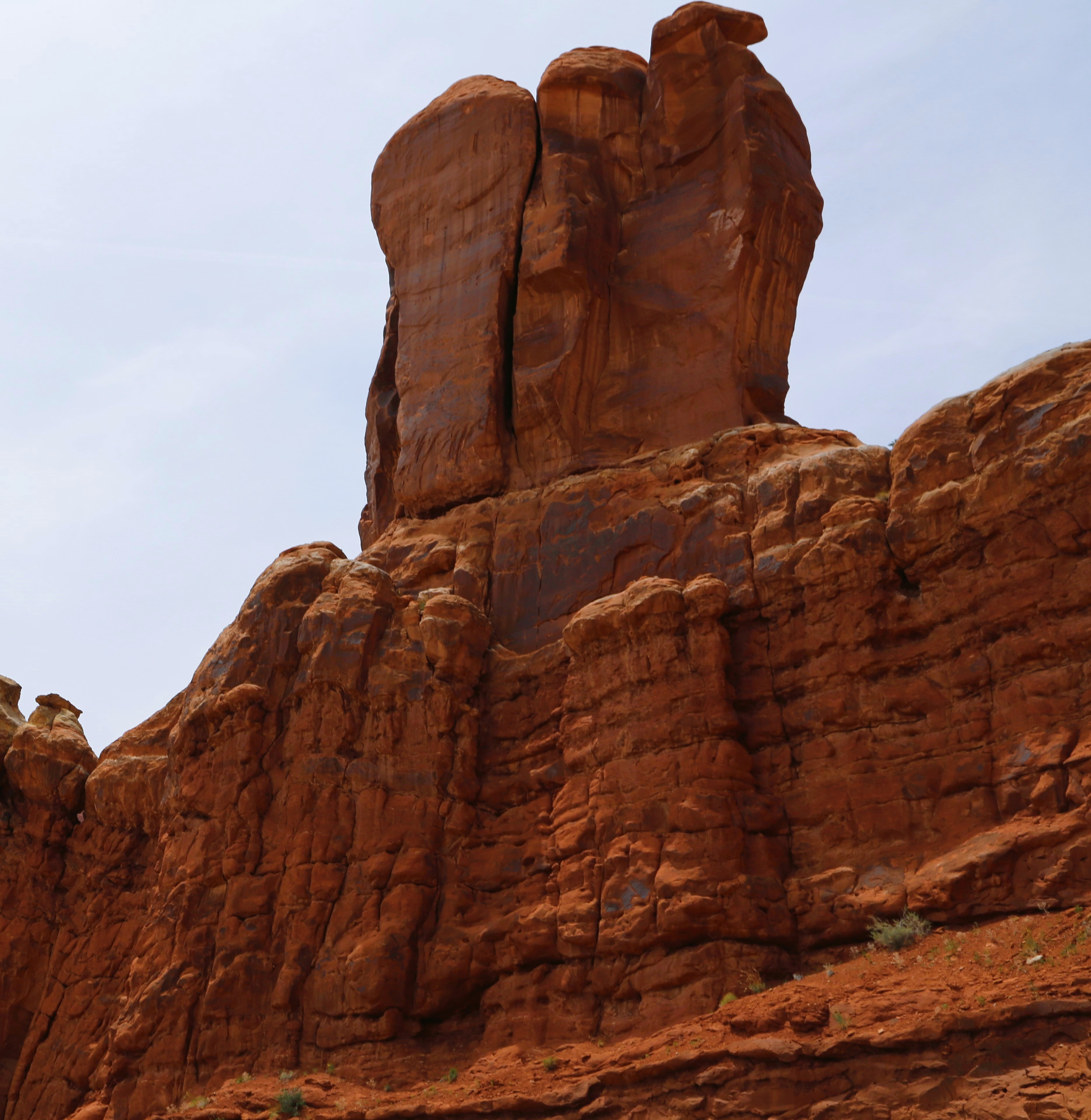
East aspect

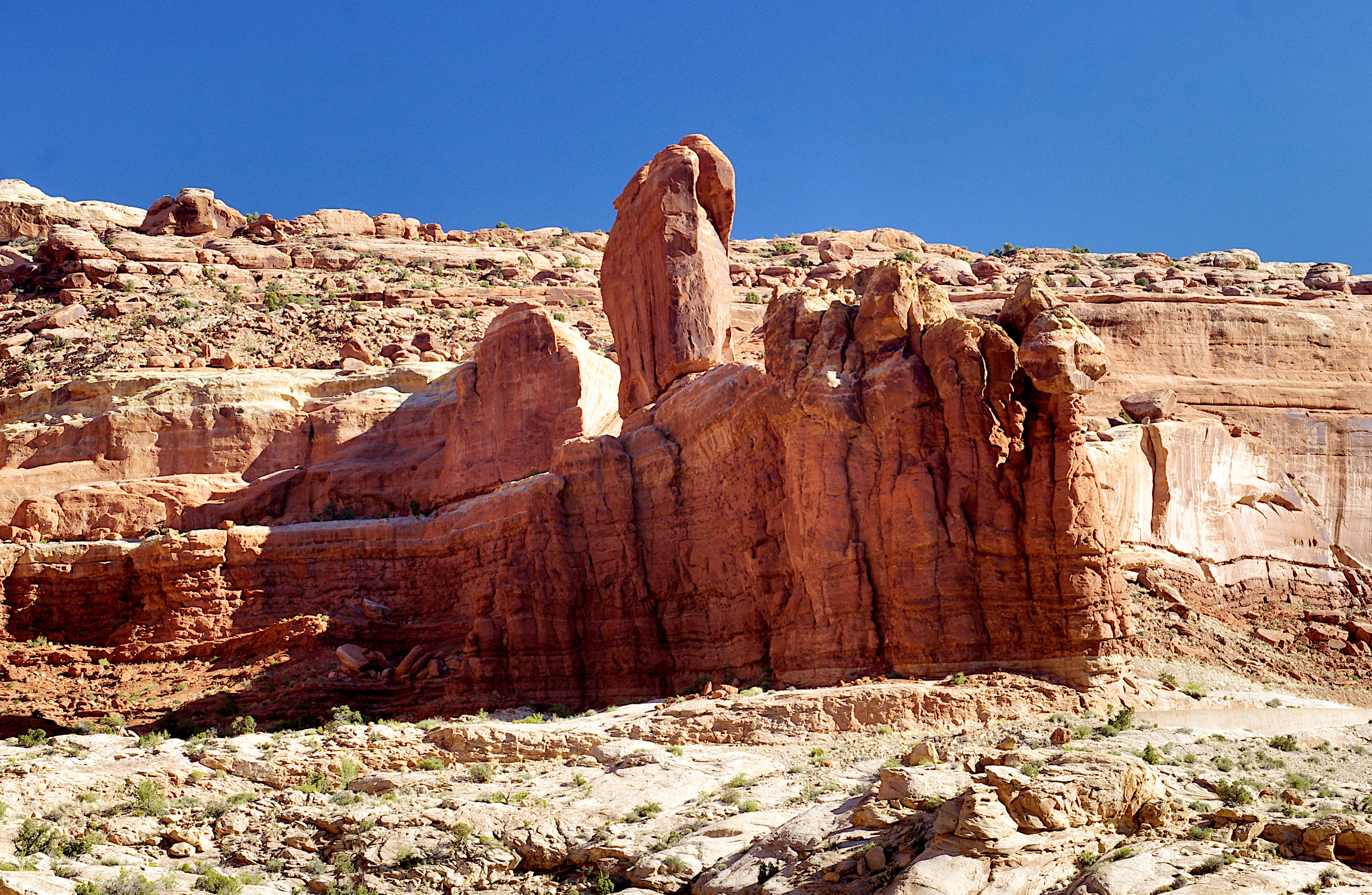
South aspect
