= Penguin Point (Seymour Island) =

Headland of Antarctica

Coordinates: 64°18′26″S 56°42′24″W

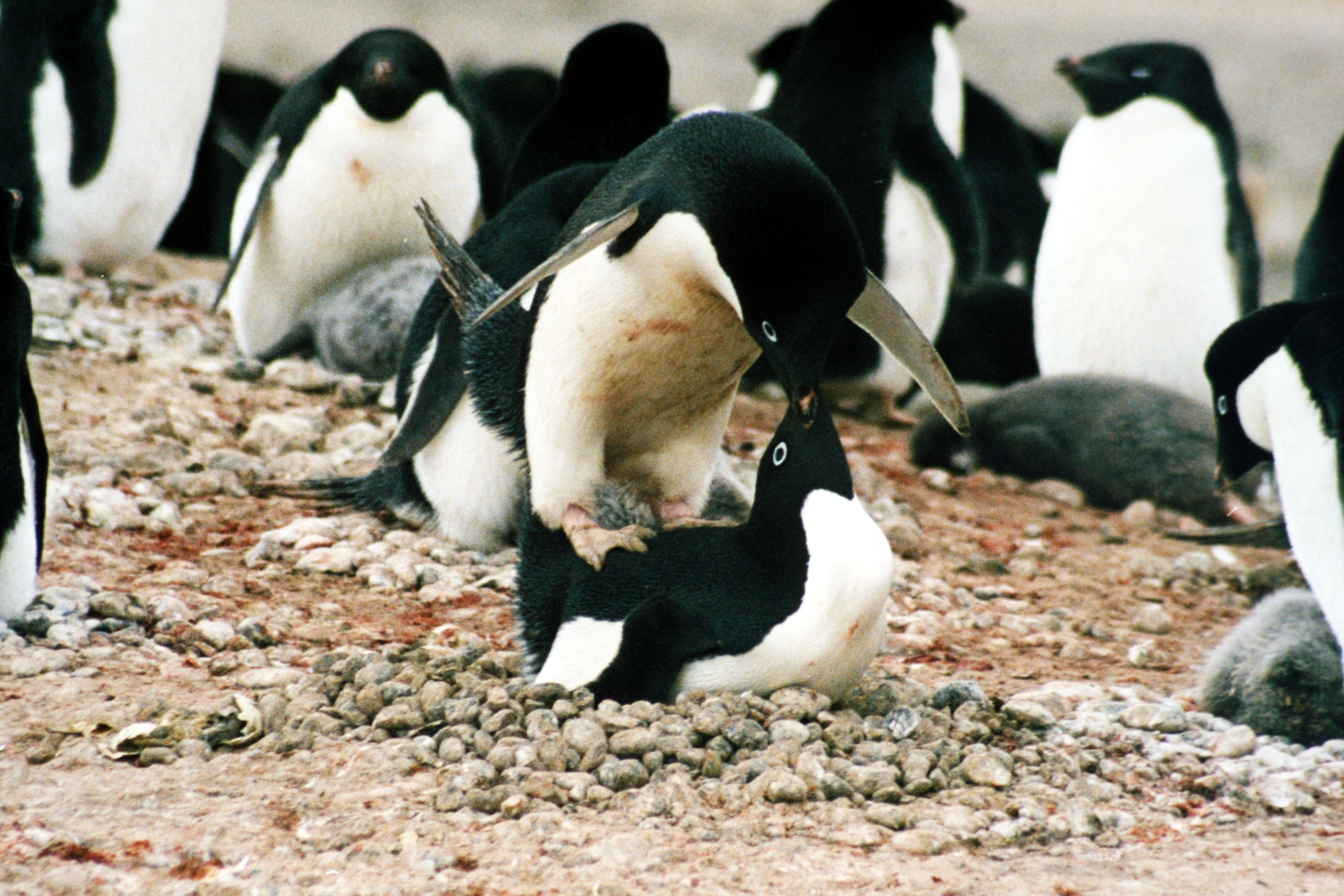
The point is an important breeding site for Adélie penguins

Penguin Point lies on the south-eastern coast of Seymour Island, in the James Ross Island group, near the north-eastern extremity of the Antarctic Peninsula. The Argentine Marambio Base is about 8 km to the north-east. A ridge of exposed dark rock named Blackrock Ridge runs west-southwest–east-northeast, 1.5 nautical miles (3 km) north of Penguin Point.

== Important Bird Area ==
Some 326 ha of sparsely vegetated, ice-free ground, including the point and adjacent cobbled beach, and extending 1260 m inland, has been identified as an Important Bird Area (IBA) by BirdLife International because it supports a large breeding colony of about 16,000 pairs of Adélie penguins. Weddell and Antarctic fur seals regularly haul out there.
