= Cape Conran =

Locality in Victoria, Australia

Cape Conran Victoria
- Coordinates: 37°48′06″S 148°43′27″E
- Population: 5 (2021 census)
- Postcode(s): 3888
- LGA(s): Shire of East Gippsland
- State electorate(s): Gippsland East
- Federal division(s): Gippsland

Cape Conran (Gunai: Kerlip or Murrow-gunnie) is a locality in the Shire of East Gippsland, Victoria, Australia. It lies within the Cape Conran Coastal Park located between Marlo and Bemm River about 400 km from Melbourne. At the 2021 census Cape Conran had a population of 5.

The area includes two capes: East Cape Conran and West Cape Conran. Both are popular recreational destinations for visitors from nearby towns such as Orbost, as well as further afield, especially in the warmer months. While there are no permanent dwellings at West Cape, the East Cape area has a manager's house and office in the Banksia Bluff camping area which has about 100 camp sites, cabins and luxury tents for short term stays.

== See also ==
- SS Ridge Park
