= Bob Bage =

Australian polar explorer

Robert Bage
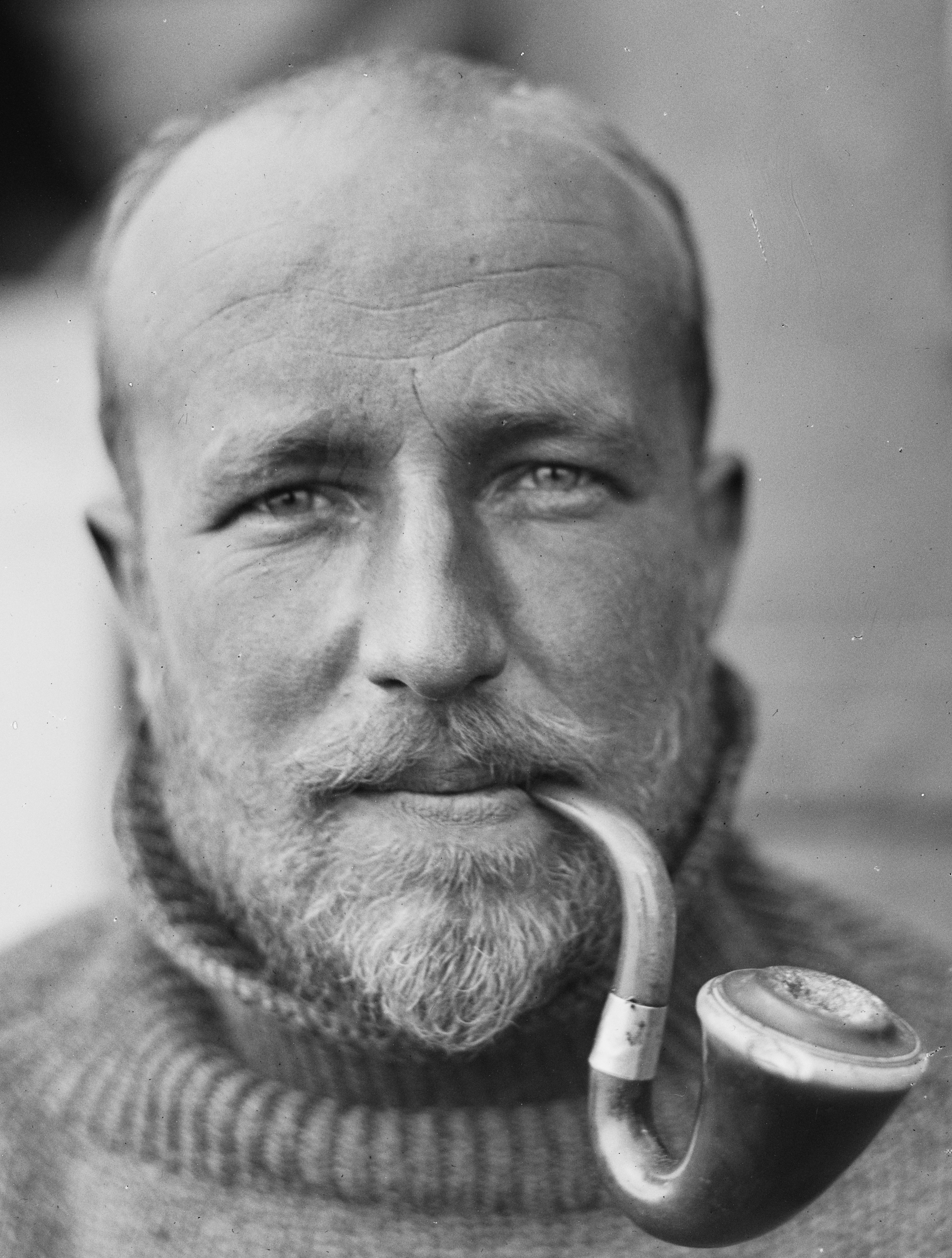
- Bage, Australasian Antarctic Expedition, 1913
- Born: Edward Frederick Robert Bage; 17 April 1888; Melbourne, Australia
- Died: 7 May 1915; Gallipoli, Turkey
- Education: Melbourne Grammar School
- Occupation(s): astronomer, explorer, soldier

Edward Frederick Robert Bage (17 April 1888 – 7 May 1915) was an Australian polar explorer with Douglas Mawson's Australasian Antarctic Expedition in 1912 and a soldier with the Royal Australian Engineers during World War I.

== Early life ==
Bage was the only son of Edward Bage, a wholesale chemist from St Kilda, a suburb of Melbourne. He had two sisters, Freda Bage, who would become a lecturer in biology, and principal of the Women's College at the University of Queensland and Ethel Bage. He was born on 17 April 1888, and was educated at the Melbourne Church of England Grammar School in 1900, where he was awarded the Witherby Scholarship in 1901. He completed school in 1904 with honours in physics at matriculation. In 1905 he was awarded a Warden's Scholarship to Trinity College at the University of Melbourne, where he studied Engineering. He obtained first-class honours in Chemistry and won an Exhibition in Surveying in 1905, graduating with a Bachelor of Civil Engineering in 1910. While a student, he was the inaugural Secretary of the University of Melbourne Student Representative Council, and rowed at Trinity College.

== Antarctic exploration ==
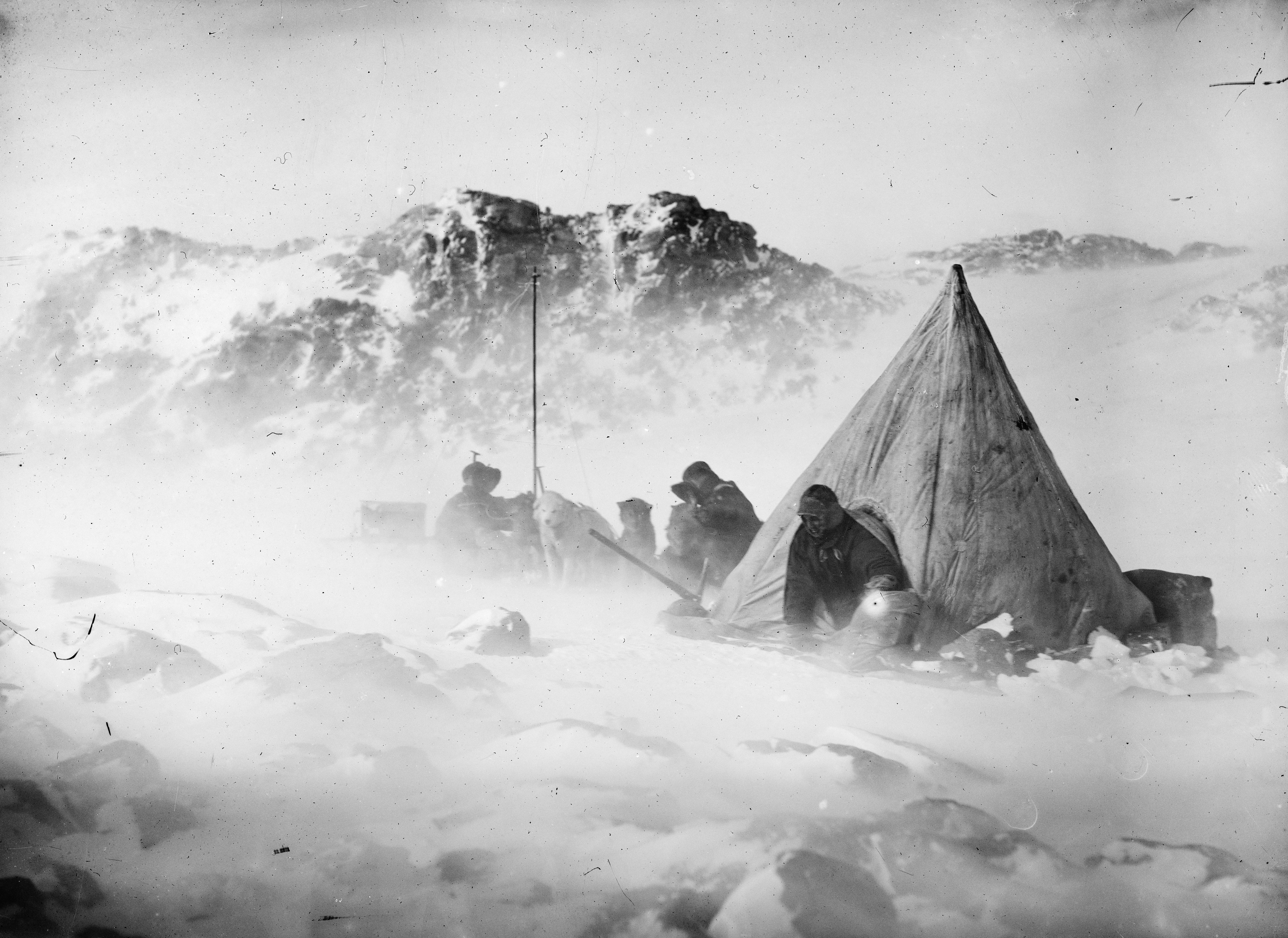
Southern party encamped in snow, Australasian Antarctic Expedition, Antarctica, 1912–13

Bage joined the militia in 1909 and enlisted as an officer with the Royal Australian Engineers at the beginning of 1911. In September, however, he was engaged as Astronomer, Assistant Magnetician and Recorder of Tides for Douglas Mawson's Australasian Antarctic Expedition. He undertook a crash course in astronomy with Pietro Baracchi from the Melbourne Observatory, whose son, Guido, Bage knew from Trinity. On 22 November, a farewell dinner was held in his honour at Trinity, after which he left for Tasmania. Mawson selected Bage in a party of six to accompany him on 9 January, landing at what he then named 'Commonwealth Bay', and then, on 19 January, the ship left eighteen men with 23 tons of equipment and two-years' worth of food.

On 10 November 1912, the 'southern sledging party' of three – Bage, the New Zealand magnetician Eric Webb, and the photographer Frank Hurley – left on a 600-mile round trip to study the extent of the South Magnetic Pole region. Despite days on which due to severe snowblindness Bage had to be carried on one of the sledges hauled by the other men, the team managed to set a sledging record of 41.6 miles in one twenty-four-hour period. One of the men who had remained in camp, Charles Laseron, recorded that Bage's "quiet determination, resolution, and foresight carried them through ... always cheerful, ready with a hand to anybody who needed it ... he was a born leader of men". The Aurora arrived to collect them, but by 8 February, Mawson's team was now four weeks overdue, and John Davis was forced to decide whom to leave behind to conduct the search: the six men chosen, including Bage, would have to over-winter again before a ship could come back for them. A mere matter of hours after the Aurora left, Mawson appeared alone, suffering from severe sunburn, frostbite and malnutrition. He was the sole survivor of his team of three. The Aurora was able to return the following day, only to be prevented from reaching the survivors by the weather. After a week, Davis decided once again to leave; Mawson, Bage and the others spent another winter in Antarctica, with Bage acting as storeman. The Aurora returned on 13 December 1913, and the expedition made landfall in Australia at Adelaide, Mawson's home town, on 26 February 1914, after more than two years away. Bage was awarded the Polar Medal by George V in February 1915.

== War service and death ==
Being stuck in the Antarctic, Bage had written a letter to the Army requesting to have his leave-without-pay extended. Bage rejoined his unit on 3 March 1914, and was posted to the Staff Office in Melbourne. As a member of the regular army, on the outbreak of war, Bage was mobilised immediately, the preliminary orders being released on 2 August. He was commissioned as a lieutenant in the First Australian Imperial Force, and second-in-command of the 3rd Field Company, Australian Engineers. Early in September he became engaged to Dorothy Scantlebury. Bage's company left on 22 September, arriving in Alexandria on 10 December and taking trains to Cairo. In February, he was promoted to captain. Training continued until 3 April when they left for Lemnos, and then, on 24 April, departed in readiness for the Gallipoli landing. The engineers were among the first to reach the shore, preparing the area so that the infantry could land, building roads, creating gun emplacements, digging trenches and building ammunition depots.

On 7 May, the commander of the 1st Australian Division, Major-General William Bridges, inspected the area near the 'Pimple', a salient at the southern end of the ANZAC lines, and devised a plan to take some of the Turkish trenches there. Bage's orders were to take a small party in support of Major Edmund Drake-Brockman of the 11th Battalion, and, in broad daylight, get to an exposed area about 150 yards beyond the front line and peg out the position of the new trench line so that the infantry could dig in that night. Bage was caught in machine-gun fire from near Lone Pine and hit in several places; he was buried in the Beach Cemetery above ANZAC Cove the following day.

His obituaries noted that he was "very popular among both officers and men", and that he was "an indefatigable worker, a thorough and efficient organiser, and one of the most promising of the younger officers of the permanent forces". Trinity held a memorial service for him on 19 June, at which "All members of the late solder's family were present". At the beginning of 1916, his mother donated £1,000 to the University of Melbourne for an Engineering scholarship in her son's memory, to the value of £40 per annum.

== Sources ==
- Bob Badget Bage, Australian War Memorial
- Ross McMullin, Farewell Dear People: Biographies of Australia's Lost Generation (Melbourne: Scribe, 2012), pp. 325–397.
- Douglas Mawson, The Home of the Blizzard: Being the Story of the Australasian Antarctic Expendition, 1911–1914 (London: Heinemann, 1915).
