= Penguin Islands (Newfoundland and Labrador) =

Island group off the south coast of Newfoundland, Canada

Coordinates: 47°23′11″N 56°59′23″W

Location of Penguin Islands in Newfoundland

The Penguin Islands are a cluster of islands and sea stacks located on the north coast of the island of Newfoundland in the province of Newfoundland and Labrador. The islands are located nearly 20 kilometers from the nearest part of the island of Newfoundland.

Historians and naturalists believe that the Penguin Islands were a former breeding ground for the great auk. Petrels were reported nesting in the islands in 1887, with an estimated 900 pairs living on South Penguin Island in 1945.

== See also ==
- Geography of Newfoundland and Labrador
