= Albatross (disambiguation) =

An albatross is one of a family of large winged seabirds.

Albatross or Albatros may also refer to:

== Animals ==
- Albatross (butterfly) or Appias, a genus of butterfly
- Albatross (horse) (1968–1998), a Standardbred horse

== Literature ==
- Albatross Books, a German publishing house that produced the first modern mass market paperback books
- Albatros Literaturpreis, a literary award
- "L'albatros" (poem) ("The Albatross"), 1859 poem by Charles Baudelaire
- The Albatross (novella), a 1971 novella by Susan Hill
- The Albatross, the fictional propeller-sustained airship in Jules Verne's novel Robur the Conqueror
- Albatross (novel), a 2019 novel by Terry Fallis
- Albatross (magazine), 1970s lesbian satirical magazine

== Film and television ==
- Films Albatros, a French film production company which operated between 1922 and 1939
- Albatross (1996 film), a South Korean film
- Albatross (2011 film), a British film
- Albatross (2015 film), an Icelandic film
- Albatross (2022 film), an American drama film
- Drift Away (film), French title Albatros, a 2021 French drama film
- "Albatross" (sketch), a sketch from Monty Python's Flying Circus, first appearing in 1970
- "Albatross" (Star Trek: The Animated Series), a 1974 episode of the animated television series
- "Albatross" (Law & Order: Criminal Intent), a 2007 episode of the television crime drama

== Music ==
- An Albatross, an American artcore/grindcore band
- Albatross (Nepali band)

=== Albums ===
- Albatross (Big Wreck album) (2012)
- Albatross (The Classic Crime album) (2006)
- Albatross, a 2005 album by The Standard
- The Albatross (album), a 2013 album by Foxing
- Albatross (Fleetwood Mac album), a 1977 compilation album by Fleetwood Mac and Christine Perfect

=== Songs ===
- "Albatross" (Big Wreck song), 2011
- "Albatross" (Corrosion of Conformity song), 1994
- "Albatross" (instrumental), by Fleetwood Mac, 1968
- "The Albatross" (song), by Taylor Swift, 2024
- "Albatross", an unreleased song by Brave Saint Saturn
- "Albatross", by Judy Collins from Wildflowers, 1967
- "Albatross", by Public Image Ltd. from Metal Box, 1979
- "Albatross", by Wild Beasts, 2011
- "Albatross", by Foals from What Went Down, 2015
- "Albatross", by Kevin Devine from Nothing's Real, So Nothing's Wrong, 2022
- "Albatross", by English Teacher from This Could Be Texas, 2024
- "Albatross", by Throwing Muses from Moonlight Concessions, 2025
- "Albatros", by Gian Franco Reverberi from Animalia, 2025

== Transportation ==
=== Aircraft ===
- Albatros Airlines (Turkey), a Turkish charter airline from 1992 to 1996
- Albatros Airways, an Albanian budget airline
- Albatros Flugzeugwerke, a German aircraft manufacturer
- Albatross Soaring Machine, an unsuccessful flying machine designed by William Paul Butusov in 1896
- Aero L-39 Albatros, a Czech jet trainer aircraft
- de Havilland Albatross, a four-engine British transport aircraft
- Grumman HU-16 Albatross, a US Air Force, Navy and Coast Guard amphibious flying boat
- Beriev A-40 Albatros, a Russian amphibious plane
- Gossamer Albatross, a human-powered airplane
- L'Albatros artificiel, gliders built by Jean-Marie Le Bris in 1856–1868
- NCSIST Albatross, a reconnaissance drone produced by the Taiwanese National Chung-Shan Institute of Science and Technology
- "Albatross" drones, reconnaissance drones developed for the Russian invasion of Ukraine by the Russian company Albatross, which operates the Yelabuga drone factory

=== Automobiles ===
- Albatros (1912 automobile), a French automobile
- Albatros (1922 automobile), a British automobile
- Albatross (automobile), an American sports car venture that was planned in 1939

=== Trains ===
- V250 (train) or Albatross, a high-speed train designed to operate between Amsterdam and Brussels
- Albatross, a GWR 3031 Class locomotive built for and run on the Great Western Railway between 1891 and 1915

=== Ships ===
- List of ships named Albatros or Albatross
- Aselsan Albatros USV family, a family of high-speed unmanned surface seaborne targets made for the Turkish Naval Forces

== Other uses ==
- Albatross (cloth), a lightweight, soft material with a napped and slightly creped surface
- Albatross (golf), a score of three under par on a hole
- Albatross (metaphor), an encumbrance or a wearisome burden
- Albatross (Rolling Thunder), a video game character
- Albatross, Missouri
- Grupo Albatros, a special operations service of the Argentine Naval Prefecture
- HMAS Albatross (air station), a Royal Australian Navy base
- Albatross Marine, a British manufacturer of very light aluminium speedboats
- Michael Gross (swimmer) or "The Albatross", former professional swimmer
- Albatross stores, special stores in the Soviet Union to sell foreign goods for special coupons
