= List of ships named Albatross =

This is a list of ships that have carried the name Albatros or Albatross, after the seabird.

== Merchant ships ==
- Albatros (19th-century ship) – an American-owned ship that brought news of the outbreak of the War of 1812 to W. P. Hunt.
- USFC Albatross – a fisheries research ship in service with the United States Commission of Fish and Fisheries from 1882 to 1898 and from 1898 to 1903 and with the United States Bureau of Fisheries from 1903 to 1917 and from 1919 to 1921 which saw service in the United States Navy as USS Albatross in 1898 and from 1917 to 1919.
- Albatros (1899) – a ketch which was the last sailing vessel trading commercially in Europe. Now a sail training vessel.
- Albatross (1920 schooner) – a Dutch/German sailing ship that was later used as a training ship, inspiring the film White Squall.
- USFS Albatross II – a fisheries research ship in service with the United States Bureau of Fisheries from 1926 to 1932 which saw service in the United States Navy as the tug USS Patuxent (AT-11) from 1909 to 1924.
- US FWS Albatross III – a fisheries research ship built in 1926 as the trawler Harvard. In service with the United States National Fish and Wildlife Service from 1948 to 1959 and briefly saw service with the United States Coast Guard in 1944 as USCGC Bellefonte.
- Albatros, a hydrofoil in service on Lake Geneva between 1964 and 1972
- Albatross – a sailing ship used in Sweden's Albatross expedition of 1947–48.
- TS Albatros – a cruise liner built in 1952, in service as Albatros 1981–84. Also in service as TS Albatross 1985–88.
- SS Albatros (1957) – an ocean liner, in service as Albatros 1993–2003.
- NOAAS Albatross IV (R 342) – a fisheries research ship in commission with the United States Fish and Wildlife Service from 1963 to 1970 and with the National Oceanic and Atmospheric Administration from 1970 to 2008.
- MS Albatros – a cruise liner built in 1973, scrapped in 2021
- FV Albatros a Dutch fishing trawler in service 1971-74

== Naval ships ==
=== Australia ===
- HMAS Albatross (1928) – a seaplane carrier launched in 1928 that left service in 1933 and was transferred to the Royal Navy in 1938.

=== Austria-Hungary ===
- SMS Albatross (1873), an Austro-Hungarian gunboat involved in Pacific exploration.

=== France ===
- French destroyer Albatros, an Aigle-class destroyer launched in 1930 and scrapped in 1959.

=== Germany ===
- SMS Albatross (1871), a German gunboat commissioned in 1871, stricken in 1899, and lost in 1906 while in use as a collier.
- SMS Albatross (1907), a German minelaying cruiser commissioned in 1908 and stricken in 1921.
- German torpedo boat Albatros (1926) – a Type 23 torpedo boat in service until wrecked on 10 April 1940.
- German fast attack craft Albatros (S61), an Albatros-class fast attack craft

=== Italy ===
- Italian torpedo boat Albatros - a torpedo boat in service 1907-23
- Italian submarine chaser Albatros – a submarine chaser and torpedo boat in service 1934–41.
- Italian corvette Albatros – an Albatros-class corvette in service 1955–85

=== United Kingdom ===
- HMS Albatross (1795) – a 16-gun Albatross-class brig-sloop launched in 1795 and sold in 1807.
- HMS Albatross (1826) – a survey schooner purchased in 1826 and sold in 1833.
- HMS Albatross (1842) – a 16-gun brig-sloop launched in 1842 and broken up in 1860.
- HMS Albatross – to have been a wood screw sloop. She was ordered in 1862 but was cancelled in 1863.
- HMS Albatross (1873) – a Fantome-class composite screw sloop launched in 1873 and broken up in 1889.
- HMS Albatross (1898) – a torpedo boat destroyer launched in 1898, reclassified as a C-class destroyer in 1913 and sold in 1920.
- HMS Albatross (1938) – a seaplane tender launched in 1928 for the Royal Australian Navy. She was transferred to the Royal Navy in 1938, and converted to a repair ship in 1942. She was sold into mercantile service in 1946 and was sold for scrapping in 1954.

=== United States ===
- USS Albatross (1858) – a steam gunboat in service 1861–65.
- USS Albatross (1882) – formerly USFC Albatross, in service 1898 and 1917–19.
- USS Albatross (SP-1003) – a motor launch in service 1917–19.
- USS Albatross (AM-71) – an Albatross-class minesweeper in service 1940–44.
- USS Albatross (AM-391) – a proposed minesweeper, contract cancelled in 1945.
- USS Albatross (AMS-1) – a YMS-1-class minesweeper in service 1942–58. Carried the name Albatross from 1947.
- USS Albatross (MSC-289) – an Albatross-class minesweeper in service 1961–70.

== See also ==
- HMAS Albatross (air station) – a naval aviation base at Nowra, New South Wales, which was opened in 1948 and is currently active.
- Albatross (disambiguation) – for other uses of Albatross.
