= Laga =

Laga may refer to:

== Places ==
- Laga (East Timor), a subdistrict of Baucau in East Timor
- Laga, Lochaber, a village on the north shore of Loch Sunart, Scotland
- Club Laga, a concert venue in Pittsburgh, Pennsylvania from 1991 to 2006

== People ==
- Mart Laga (1936–1977), Estonian Soviet basketball player
- Mike Laga (born 1960), former MLB baseball player (1982–1990)

== Other ==
- Laga FC, an Indonesian football club now named Sragen United F.C.
- Sport Rowing Club Laga, a rowing club in Delft
- MV Laga (1938), a Panamanian cargo ship in service 1974-82
