= USS Edithena =

Patrol vessel of the United States Navy

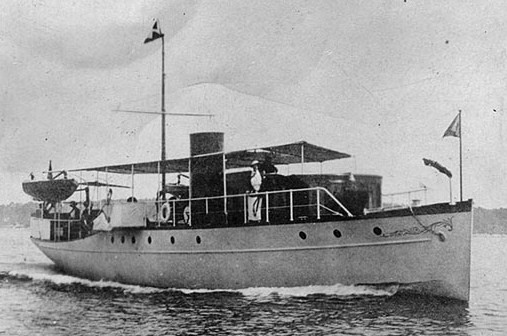
- Edithena as a private motor yacht, underway sometime between 1914 and 1917.

History

United States
- Name: Edithena
- Owner: Loring Q. White, Boston, Massachusetts (1914)
- Builder: Gas Engine & Power Company & Charles L. Seabury Company, Morris Heights, Bronx, New York
- Launched: 1914
- Sponsored by: Miss Adena White
- Completed: 1914
- Home port: Buzzards Bay, Massachusetts
- Fate: Sold to U.S. Navy June 1917

United States Navy
- Name: USS Edithena
- Namesake: Previous name retained
- Cost: US$17,000
- Acquired: June 1917
- Commissioned: 20 June 1917 or August 1917
- Stricken: 21 October 1919
- Fate: Transferred to the U.S. Bureau of Fisheries

U.S. Bureau of Fisheries
- Name: USFS Widgeon
- Namesake: Widgeon, a group of birds in the genus Mareca in the subfamily Anatinae, known as dabbling ducks
- Acquired: October 1919
- Identification: WTFH
- Fate: Transferred to Fish and Wildlife Service 30 June 1940

U.S. Fish and Wildlife Service
- Name: US FWS Widgeon
- Namesake: Previous name retained
- Acquired: 30 June 1940
- Fate: Transferred to U.S. Navy 1942
- Acquired: Transferred from U.S. Navy 1944
- Fate: Deleted during Fiscal Year 1944; Sold by 1947

United States Navy
- Name: USS YP-200
- Acquired: 1942
- Commissioned: 1942
- Stricken: 29 July 1944
- Fate: Transferred to Fish and Wildlife Service 1944

United States
- Name: Edithena
- Namesake: Previous name restored
- Acquired: By 1947
- Home port: Seattle, Washington

United States
- Name: Ila Mae
- Home port: Anacortes, Washington
- Fate: Extant 1986
- Notes: Fishing vessel; registered 1970–1986

General characteristics (as motor yacht)
- Type: Motor yacht
- Length: 75 ft (22.9 m)
- Propulsion: 2 x ≈50–65 hp (37–48 kW) 570 rpm Speedway gasoline engines
- Speed: 13 mph (21 km/h) (trials); 12 mph (19 km/h) (average); 10–12 mph (16–19 km/h) (cruising)
- Boats & landing craft carried: 1 x 15 ft (4.6 m) tender; 1 x 12 ft (3.7 m) dinghy
- Crew: 6

General characteristics (as U.S. Navy patrol boat)
- Type: Patrol boat
- Length: 75 ft (22.9 m)
- Beam: 15 ft (4.6 m)
- Draft: 4 ft (1.2 m)
- Propulsion: 2 x ≈50–65 hp (37–48 kW) 570 rpm Speedway gasoline engines
- Speed: 12 knots (22 km/h; 14 mph)
- Complement: 11
- Armament: 1 × 1-pounder gun

General characteristics (as BOF fishery patrol boat)
- Type: Fishery patrol boat
- Tonnage: 15 GRT
- Length: ca. 68 ft (20.7 m) (sources vary)
- Beam: 15 ft (4.6 m)
- Draft: 3.75 ft (1.1 m)
- Propulsion: 2 x ≈50–65 hp (37–48 kW) 570 rpm Speedway gasoline engines
- Speed: 9–12 knots (17–22 km/h; 10–14 mph)

USS Edithena was a United States Navy patrol vessel in commission from 1917 to 1919 that saw service during World War I. Prior to her U.S. Navy service, she operated as the private motor yacht Edithena from 1914 to 1917. After the conclusion World War I, she served as the fishery patrol vessel USFS Widgeon in the fleet of the United States Bureau of Fisheries from 1919 to 1940 and as US FWS Widgeon in the fleet of the Fish and Wildlife Service from 1940 to 1942. During World War II, she returned to U.S. Navy service from 1942 to 1944 as the yard patrol boat USS YP-200. By 1947 she had returned to private ownership, first as Edithena and during the 1970s and 1980s as the fishing vessel Ila Mae.

== Construction, characteristics, and private use ==
Edithena was built as a private motor yacht by the Gas Engine & Power Company & Charles L. Seabury Company in Morris Heights, the Bronx, New York, in 1914 for Loring Q. White of Boston, Massachusetts, who personally supervised her construction. She was designed for both summer and winter cruising. She was flush-decked to allow the maximum possible amount of space on deck for social dancing, with only a forward deckhouse – which housed a dining saloon – and her funnel interrupting the flow of the deck. She had a spacious afterdeck, and her decks were covered entirely by an awning. Her bridge was located at the after end of the deckhouse. She had a galley, electric lighting, hot water, passenger accommodations consisting of two state rooms and additional Pullman berths, and accommodation forward for a crew of six. She carried two boats, a 15-foot (4.6 m) tender and a 12-foot (3.7 m) dinghy.

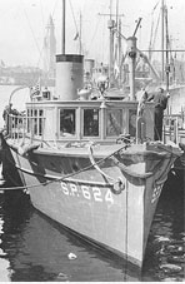
Starboard bow views of Edithena as a private motor yacht in 1914 (left) and as the U.S. Navy patrol vessel USS Edithena (SP-624), moored in Boston, Massachusetts, ca. 1918 (right).

Edithena was launched in 1914, with White's daughter, Adena White, breaking the traditional bottle of champagne across Edithena's bow. Powered by two 50 to 65 horsepower (37 to 48 kW) 570 rpm Speedway gasoline engines, Edithena was designed to average 12 miles per hour (10 kn; 19 km/h) and to cruise at 10 to 12 mph (8.7 to 10.4 kn; 16 to 19 km/h), and she reached 13 mph (11 kn; 21 km/h) on sea trials. After acceptance by White, she made the voyage from Morris Heights to White's summer home, "The Moorings," in Buzzards Bay, Massachusetts. In 1914, White told Power Boating magazine that he planned to use Edithena for day and weekend cruises on Buzzards Bay and Long Island Sound during the warmer months and in the Miami, Florida, area during the winter season.

== U.S. Navy, 1917–1919 ==
The United States Navy purchased Edithena in June 1917 for US$17,000 for use as a section patrol boat during World War I. After undergoing drastic modification, she was commissioned as USS Edithena (SP-624) on 20 June 1917 or in August 1917 (sources vary). Assigned to the 1st Naval District and based at Boston, Massachusetts, Edithena conducted patrol duty off northern New England through the end of World War I on 11 November 1918 and into 1919.

Under an executive order dated 24 May 1919 addressing the disposition of vessels the U.S. Navy no longer required, Edithena was among several vessels designated for transfer to the United States Bureau of Fisheries (BOF). Edithena was stricken from the Navy List on 21 October 1919 and transferred to the BOF.

== U.S. Bureau of Fisheries ==
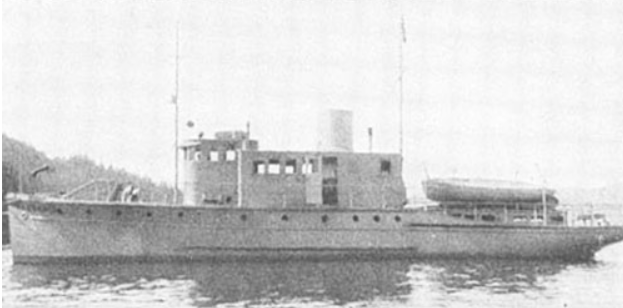
USFS Widgeon in 1924.

After the U.S. Bureau of Fisheries (BOF) renamed the vessel USFS Widgeon, the BOF vessel USFS Halcyon towed her from Woods Hole, Massachusetts, to Hampton Roads, Virginia, arriving there on 25 November 1921. At Norfolk Navy Yard in Portsmouth, Virginia, Widgeon was loaded aboard the U.S. Navy cargo ship USS Gold Star. Gold Star departed Norfolk, Virginia, on 22 April 1922 bound for the Pacific Northwest and delivered Widgeon to Seattle, Washington.

At Seattle, Widgeon underwent modifications for BOF service as a fishery patrol vessel in the waters off the Territory of Alaska. After their completion, she departed Seattle in August 1922 to begin patrol duties off Southeast Alaska. At some point over the next 12 months, United States Secretary of Commerce Herbert Hoover embarked aboard Widgeon as part of President Warren G. Harding's travelling party during a visit by Harding to the Territory of Alaska. In 1924, Widgeon′s engines were rebuilt, and in 1928, her patrol duties expanded to include the protection of the fur seal population in the Pribilof Islands in the Bering Sea.

Widgeon was out of service during July 1929 while her engines underwent repairs, and that month Highway, a vessel borrowed from the United States Bureau of Public Roads, carried out patrols assigned to Widgeon. On 12 October 1929, Widgeon ran aground on Russian Reef off Alaska's Whitewater Bay. Two motorboats came to her assistance and a troller and Alaska Natives aboard the vessel Merrimac reported Widgeon to be completely wrecked, but a rising tide allowed her to slide off the reef, and, despite damage to her propeller and rudder, she reached port under her own power to undergo repairs. The owners of the motorboats later filed a salvage claim with the United States Government for assisting Widgeon. In May 1930, Widgeon suffered an on-board explosion and fire while she was docked at Juneau, Territory of Alaska; the Juneau Fire Department extinguished the blaze.

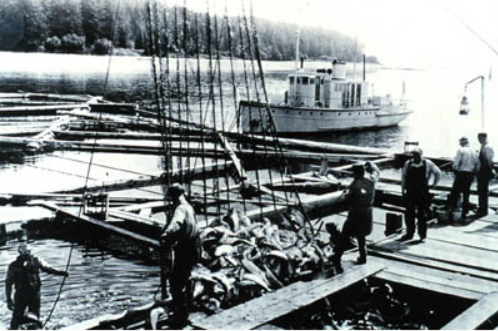
USFS Widgeon (in right background) ca. 1938, photographed with men brailing salmon from a floating fish trap in the foreground.

When Widgeon arrived in Alaskan waters, her bearings required rebabbitting every two months, but by 1930 she had received new B. F. Goodrich Company cutless bearings that relieved her crew of this frequent maintenance requirement. Widgeon underwent an extensive overhaul in Seattle during the winter of 1931–1932.

== Fish and Wildlife Service ==
In 1939, the BOF was transferred from the United States Department of Commerce to the United States Department of the Interior, and on 30 June 1940, it was merged with the Interior Department's Division of Biological Survey to form the new Fish and Wildlife Service, an element of the Interior Department destined to become the United States Fish and Wildlife Service in 1956. The vessel thus became part of the FWS fleet as US FWS Widgeon.

== U.S. Navy, 1942–1944 ==
The U.S. Navy acquired Widgeon in 1942 for World War II service, designating her as a yard patrol boat and renaming her USS YP-200. Assigned to the Thirteenth Naval District Inshore Patrol, as of 15 May 1942 she was based at Section Base, Port Townsend in Port Townsend, Washington. In Navy service, YP-200 became a radar picket boat.

The Navy struck YP-200 from the Navy list on 29 July 1944. Presumably she was transferred back to the Fish and Wildlife Service after her World War II Navy service ended, but the FWS last listed Kittiwake as part of its FWS fleet during Fiscal Year 1944, which ran from 1 July 1943 to 30 June 1944. Kittiwake therefore apparently did not return to active service with the FWS after her World War II Navy career ended.

== Later career ==
By 1947, the vessel had reverted to her original name, Edithena, and was under private ownership with her home port at Seattle. From 1970 to 1986, she was in service as a fishing vessel with the name Ila Mae and her home port at Anacortes, Washington.
