= USS Patapsco (AT-10) =

United States Navy fleet tug

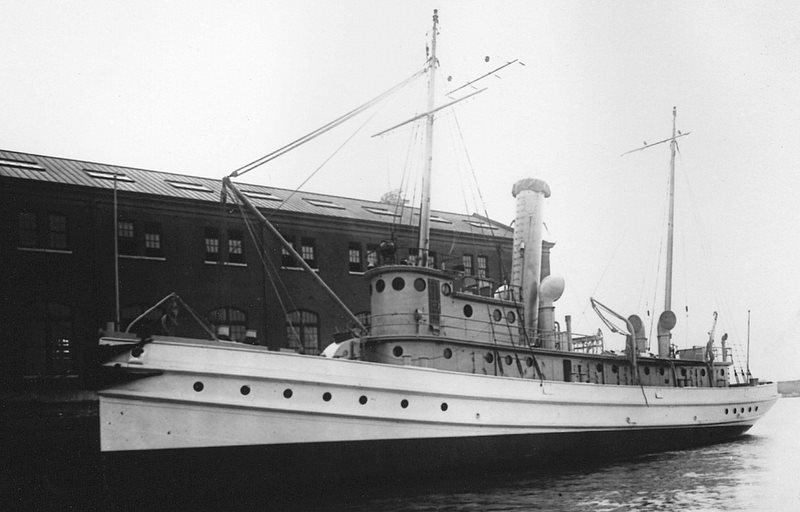
- USS Patapsco at Portsmouth Navy Yard, 25 July 1909

History

United States Navy
- Name: USS Patapsco (Fleet Tug No. 10)
- Namesake: The Patapsco River in Maryland
- Builder: Portsmouth Navy Yard in Kittery, Maine
- Laid down: 15 April 1907
- Launched: 29 June 1908
- Commissioned: 27 July 1909
- Decommissioned: 16 January 1925
- Reclassified: Fleet tug, AT-10, 17 July 1920
- Stricken: 4 March 1936
- Fate: Sold to Boston Iron & Metal Co., Baltimore, Maryland, 18 June 1936 for scrapping. Scrapping completed by 1941.

General characteristics (as U.S. Navy vessel)
- Type: Tug
- Tonnage: 521 GRT
- Displacement: 755 tons
- Length: 157 ft (48 m)
- Beam: 30 ft 6 in (9.30 m)
- Draft: 15 ft 6 in (4.72 m)
- Propulsion: Two triple-expansion steam engines, 2 shafts. 1,160 HP
- Speed: 13 knots (24 km/h; 15 mph)
- Complement: 51
- Armament: two 3-pounder guns

The fifth USS Patapsco (Fleet Tug No. 10, later AT-10) was a fleet tug in commission in the United States Navy from 1909 to 1925. She served the United States Atlantic Fleet and saw service in World War I.

== Construction and commissioning ==
Patapsco was a two-masted, steel-hulled, sea-going tug, laid down on 15 April 1907 by the Portsmouth Navy Yard at Kittery, Maine, and launched on 29 June 1908. She was commissioned on 27 July 1909 as USS Patapsco (Fleet Tug No. 10).

== United States Navy service ==
Prior to the outbreak of World War I, Patapsco operated off the eastern seaboard as a tender for the Atlantic Fleet. For the first months of the war she served with Mine Squadron 1 as nets were planted and mine experiments carried out. In November 1917, plans for a mine barrage across the North Sea necessitated a drastic increase in trained mine personnel, resulting in a training camp being established at Newport, Rhode Island. Patapsco then expanded her duties to include seamanship training around mine handling.

In early spring 1918 new ships were added as the squadron prepared for overseas deployment. Patapsco, with Patuxent (Tug No. 11), sailed to escort submarine chasers to Brest, whence they steamed to Naval Base 18, Inverness, Scotland, arriving 24 June. For the remainder of the war she remained in the area, inspecting mine fields and keeping up communications between mine bases.

Following the Armistice, Patapsco, again with Patuxent, conducted experiments to develop the gear and techniques to sweep the North Sea Mine Barrage. In December, she accompanied wooden vessels to the barrage to determine the effectiveness of the remaining mines, and found most still "live".

Experimental activities and tender duties continued through the winter months, and in March 1919 Patapsco and Patuxent tested "electrical protective devices" to render mine exploders ineffective. On the 22nd she arrived off the mined area, which stretched between the Orkney Islands and the Norwegian coast. By afternoon the devices' efficacy had been proven but other problems were discovered, among them the danger of countermined mines.

On the last sweep of the day Patapsco exploded an upper level mine. Two lower-level mines were detonated by the first, one directly beneath Patuxent. Damage to that tug was quickly repaired and both vessels soon returned to the barrage for experiments to minimize the danger of countermining.

In April the base of operations was moved to Kirkwall and minesweeping operations began once again at the end of the month. On 9 July 1919 during the fourth operation, Patapsco fell victim to the very danger she had worked against when three low-level countermined mines exploded beneath her. Six other vessels were also mined that day and sustained significant damage, but the tug was largely unharmed.

Patapsco continued operations with the North Sea Minesweeping Detachment until 25 November, and after a period of availability in England she sailed for the United States. In January 1920 she reported to the First Naval District at Boston for a 2 1/2-year tour. Thence in July 1922 she sailed south to Santo Domingo where she remained as a tender until the summer of 1924. Returning to the east coast, she entered the Norfolk Navy Yard for inactivation, decommissioning on 16 January 1925.

== Final disposition ==
Patapsco remained in reserve at Norfolk until stricken from the Navy List on 4 March 1936. Her hull was sold for scrapping on 18 June 1936 to the Boston Iron and Metal Co., Baltimore, Maryland. She was not immediately scrapped however, and remained intact at the facility through 1940. It is believed that scrapping of the vessel was completed the following year.
