= USS Halcyon (SP-518) =

Patrol vessel of the United States Navy

History

U.S. Bureau of Fisheries
- Name: USFS Halcyon
- Namesake: Halcyon, a genus of the tree kingfishers, near passerine birds in the subfamily Halcyoninae
- Ordered: March 1916
- Builder: Townsend Marine Railway and Construction Company, Boothbay Harbor, Maine
- Cost: US$44,217
- Launched: 30 November 1916
- Completed: 3 May 1917
- Home port: Boothbay Harbor, Maine (1921); Woods Hole, Massachusetts (1921–1927)
- Fate: Transferred to U.S. Navy 14 May 1917
- Acquired: Transferred from U.S. Navy 5 August 1919
- Fate: Condemned and sold November 1927

United States Navy
- Name: USS Halcyon
- Namesake: Previous name retained
- Acquired: 14 May 1917
- Commissioned: 14 May 1917
- Decommissioned: 24 June 1919
- Stricken: 31 July 1919
- Fate: Transferred to U.S. Bureau of Fisheries 5 August 1919

General characteristics (as Bureau of Fisheries vessel)
- Type: Fishery research vessel
- Length: 108 ft 6 in (33.1 m) overall (Note: This length, from the Report of the United States Commissioner of Fisheries for the Fiscal Year 1916 With Appendixes, p. 112, differs drastically from the vessel′s length as provided by the Dictionary of American Naval Fighting Ships.)
- Beam: 22 ft (6.7 m) (Note: This beam, from the Report of the United States Commissioner of Fisheries for the Fiscal Year 1916 With Appendixes, p. 112, differs drastically from the vessel's beam as provided by the Dictionary of American Naval Fighting Ships.)
- Draft: 8 ft (2.4 m)
- Propulsion: 1 x 320 hp (240 kW) steam engine, Almy boiler, one shaft

General characteristics (as U.S. Navy vessel)
- Type: Patrol vessel
- Displacement: 275 tons
- Length: 61 ft (18.6 m) (Note: This length, from the Dictionary of American Naval Fighting Ships differs drastically from the vessel′s length as provided by the Report of the United States Commissioner of Fisheries for the Fiscal Year 1916 With Appendixes, p. 112.)
- Beam: 12 ft 4 in (3.8 m) (Note: This beam, from the Dictionary of American Naval Fighting Ships differs drastically from the vessel′s beam as provided by the Report of the United States Commissioner of Fisheries for the Fiscal Year 1916 With Appendixes, p. 112.)
- Speed: 11 knots (20 km/h; 13 mph)

USS Halcyon (SP-518) was a United States Navy patrol vessel in commission from 1917 to 1919. She saw service during World War I and its immediate aftermath. After the conclusion of her naval service, she was in the United States Bureau of Fisheries fleet as the research vessel USFS Halcyon from 1919 to 1927.

== Construction and characteristics ==
After receiving an appropriation of US$45,000 from the United States Congress for the construction of a ship for use along the coast of Maine, the U.S. Bureau of Fisheries (BOF) awarded a contract for US$44,217 to the Townsend Marine Railway and Construction Company at Boothbay Harbor, Maine. Designed both to support the fish hatchery at the BOF's Boothbay Harbor station and to conduct oceanographic and fisheries science research, the ship, named USFS Halcyon, was launched on 30 November 1916 and completed and accepted by the BOF on 3 May 1917. She was 108 feet 6 inches (33.1 m) long and of wooden construction, and her main deck had a cabin, a laboratory, accommodations for her officers and embarked scientists, and a mast fitted for dredging. Crew quarters were below decks, as were water tanks and equipment for transporting live fishes. She had a 320-horsepower (239 kW) steam engine, an Almy boiler, and a single screw.

== Operational history ==
=== U.S. Navy ===
While Halcyon was under construction, the United States entered World War I on 6 April 1917. As a result, before Halycon could begin her intended fisheries service, the Bureau of Fisheries transferred her to the United States Navy on 14 May 1917 for war service. The Navy commissioned her the same day at Boston, Massachusetts, as USS Halcyon (SP-518), (Note: The U.S. Navy originally intended to acquire the vessel Surf for World War I use as a patrol vessel in the section patrol and to assign Surf the designation SP-518, but never commissioned Surf, and reassigned the designation "SP-518" to Halcyon.) the first U.S. Navy ship of the name. Assigned to the section patrol in the 1st Naval District in northern New England, Halcyon performed harbor patrol duties for the remainder of World War I and in its immediate aftermath. The Navy decommissioned her on 24 June 1919, struck her from the Navy List on 31 July 1919, and transferred her back to the Bureau of Fisheries on 5 August 1919.

=== U.S. Bureau of Fisheries ===
The Bureau of Fisheries reported that the Navy transferred Halcyon back in good condition, but also that she was not fully complete or equipped at the time of her 1917 transfer to the Navy and that she needed additional work before she was ready for BOF service. This included the removal of a heavy gun platform the Navy had installed on her forward deck, an overhaul of her engine and other machinery, interior alterations, and the installation of bilge keels, electric lighting, and a dredging winch.

Finally ready for fishery service, USFS Halcyon made her first scientific cruise in August 1920; conducted at the request of fishing interests in Massachusetts, the cruise covered 1,000 nautical miles (1,900 km; 1,200 mi) of fishing grounds in the Gulf of Maine and to the south and southwest of the South Shoal Lightship in an unsuccessful attempt to locate schools of mackerel. She then made two oceanographic cruises in the Gulf of Maine under the direction of Dr. Henry B. Bigelow, the first in December 1920–January 1921 and the second in March 1921, steaming a combined total of 1,286 nautical miles (2,382 km; 1,480 mi) between Cape Cod, Massachusetts, and Nova Scotia, Canada. Based at the BOF's Boothbay Harbor station from July to October 1921, she underwent an overhaul in July and August 1921. With it completed, she made a 1,243-nautical-mile (2,302 km; 1,430 mi) cruise between Nantucket, Massachusetts, Browns Bank, and Yarmouth, Nova Scotia, Canada, to collect bottom samples in support of a hydrographic survey of the Gulf of Maine.

In October 1921, Halcyon's home port changed to the BOF station at Woods Hole, Massachusetts. She towed the BOF vessel USFS Widgeon from Woods Hole to Hampton Roads, Virginia, arriving there on 25 November 1921. (Note: USFS Widgeon subsequently was loaded aboard the U.S. Navy cargo ship USS Gold Star at Hampton Roads for delivery to Seattle, Washington, and ultimately for duty as a United States Bureau of Fisheries patrol vessel in the waters of the Territory of Alaska. (See NOAA Fisheries Alaska Science Fisheries Center AFSC Historical Corner: Widgeon, World War I Boat.))

During March and April 1922, Halcyon was at Newport, Rhode Island, spending little time at sea but conducting work in support of flatfish studies by the Woods Hole station. She spent June 1922 preparing for a cruise to study currents, and by 30 June 1922 had steamed a total of 3,920 nautical miles (7,260 km; 4,510 mi) over the preceding year. On 30 June 1922 she got underway from Woods Hole and conducted a cruise during which she made observations of currents on lines extending 150 nautical miles (280 km; 170 mi) from Sandy Hook, Connecticut, 150 nautical miles (280 km; 170 mi) from Chatham, Massachusetts, and 25 nautical miles (46 km; 29 mi) from Cape Elizabeth, Maine. During August and September 1922, her crew overhauled the BOF fishery patrol vessel USFS Kittiwake.

In February 1923, Halycon provided valuable service in keeping channels open through ice in the harbors of Gloucester, Manchester-by-the-Sea, and Salem, Massachusetts, and from April through June 1923, she tagged codfish near Nantucket. By 30 June 1923, she had steamed 3,575 nautical miles (6,621 km; 4,114 mi) over the preceding year.

During fiscal year 1924, which ran from 1 July 1923 to 30 June 1924, Halcyon again tagged codfish during the summer months. She also used drift bottles to study currents on 25-nautical-mile (46 km; 29 mi) lines running offshore from Mount Desert and Cape Elizabeth, Maine, and Cape Ann and Cape Cod, Massachusetts, and conducted two short cruises to observe water temperatures in Massachusetts Bay.

During fiscal year 1925 (1 July 1924–30 June 1925), Halcyon steamed 5,143 nautical miles (9,525 km; 5,918 mi). Although she devoted the winter of 1924–1925 to fish-culture work in support of the BOF fish hatchery at Gloucester, Massachusetts, she spent much of the rest of the fiscal year investigating fisheries in the Gulf of Maine, operating from Nantucket Shoals to Mount Desert, Maine. Most of her work during the fiscal year involved tagging cod, haddock, and pollack to gain data on their migrations, and her crew and embarked scientists tagged 16,000 fish during the fiscal year. However, she also made some temperature observations and collected shore fishes.

Halcyon continued her fishery investigations in the Gulf of Maine during fiscal year 1926 (1 July 1925–30 June 1926), working in concert with the BOF research vessel USFS Gannet and steaming nearly 3,000 nautical miles (5,600 km; 3,500 mi). She interrupted this work in February 1926 to visit Portsmouth Navy Yard in Kittery, Maine, where her crew reconditioned the newly acquired BOF research vessel USFS Albatross II.

Fiscal year 1926 turned out to be Halcyon's last year of active BOF service. By the time Albatross II began operating for the BOF in August 1926, taking up Halcyon's former duties in and around the Gulf of Maine, the BOF had laid up Halcyon. Deeming her to be "well built" but of "peculiar design" and no longer suited to BOF requirements, the BOF condemned and sold her in November 1927.
