= Albatross (automobile) =

Defunct American motor vehicle manufacturer

The Albatross was an American sports car venture that was planned in 1939, but never came to fruition. The plan had been to market an ultra-streamlined four-seat tourer body, built on a standard Mercury chassis which was extended to a 137-inch (350 cm) wheelbase, based on a European custom-made car owned by cartoonist Peter Arno. The proposed car was advertised in at least one periodical, and at least one was built.
