= US FWS Albatross III =

U.S. fisheries research vessel

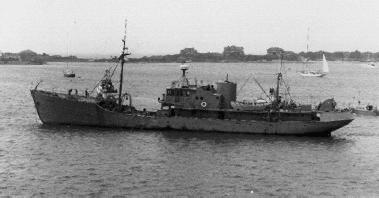

History

United States
- Name: SS Harvard
- Owner: General Seafoods Corporation
- Builder: Bath Iron Works, Bath, Maine
- Completed: 1926
- Fate: Sold to U.S. Government 1939

U.S. Fish and Wildlife Service
- Name: US FWS Albatross III
- Namesake: Predecessors USFC/USFS Albatross and USFS Albatross II
- Acquired: 1939
- Fate: Transferred to U.S. Coast Guard 1942
- Acquired: Transferred from U.S. Coast Guard 1944
- Commissioned: 19 March 1948
- Decommissioned: March 1959
- Fate: Sold November 1959

United States Coast Guard
- Name: USCGC Bellefonte (WYP-373)
- Acquired: 1942
- Commissioned: 6 April 1944
- Decommissioned: 22 August 1944
- Fate: Transferred to U.S. Fish and Wildlife Service 1944

Panama
- Name: MV Nyleve
- Owner: Enos Shipping Corporation (1963)
- Fate: Wrecked 28 March 1969

General characteristics (as fisheries research ship)
- Type: Fisheries research ship
- Displacement: 525 tons
- Length: 179 ft (55 m)
- Beam: 24 ft (7.3 m)
- Draft: 12 ft (3.7 m)
- Installed power: Three diesel motor-generator sets, 140 kW of 110-volt DC power
- Propulsion: Fairbanks-Morse seven-cylinder, 805-hp (600-kW) diesel engine
- Range: 4,500 nm (8,333 km) cruising
- Complement: 35 personnel: 21 (later 18) crew, 6 scientists, and accommodation for 8 additional personnel

General characteristics (as Coast Guard patrol vessel)
- Type: Patrol vessel
- Length: 179 ft (55 m)
- Beam: 24 ft (7.3 m)
- Propulsion: Fairbanks-Morse seven-cylinder, 805-hp (600-kW) diesel engine
- Armament: 1 × 3-inch (76.2-mm) 50-caliber gun; 2 × 20 mm/80-caliber guns; 2 × depth charge projectors; 2 × depth charge tracks; 2 × Mousetrap

US FWS Albatross III was a fisheries research ship in commission in the United States Fish and Wildlife Service from 1948 to 1959. Prior to her Fish and Wildlife Service career, she operated as the commercial fishing trawler SS Harvard and briefly saw service during World War II as the United States Coast Guard patrol vessel USCGC Bellefonte (WYP-373), in commission from April to August 1944. She was wrecked in Cuba as Nyleve in 1969.

== Construction and early history ==
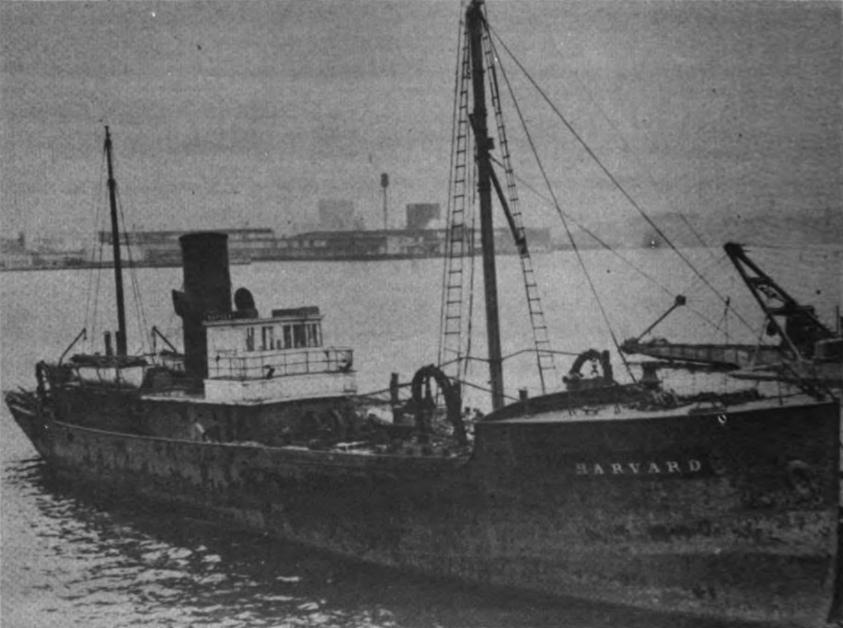
SS Harvard

The ship was built in 1926 by Bath Iron Works at Bath, Maine, as the 140-foot (43-meter) commercial steam trawler SS Harvard. Harvard fished the waters off New England until 1939, when the General Seafoods Corporation sold her to the United States Government for $1.00 (USD). She came under the control of the United States Department of the Interior, which assigned her to the U.S. Fish and Wildlife Service for conversion to and operation as the fisheries research ship Albatross III. She was named for USFC/USFS Albatross, a famed fisheries research ship in service with the U.S. Commission of Fish and Fisheries and the U.S. Bureau of Fisheries from 1882 to 1921, and her successor USFS Albatross II, in commission with the U.S. Bureau of Fisheries from 1926 to 1932.

== United States Coast Guard service ==
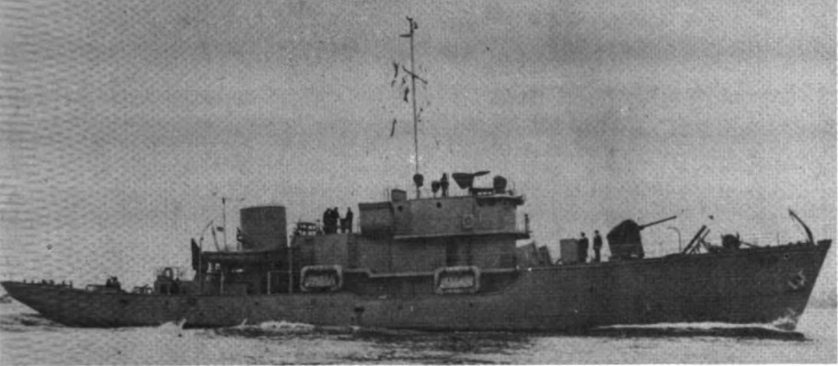
USCGC Bellefonte (WYP-373)

The United States entered World War II on 7 December 1941. By 1942, Albatross III's conversion was well underway, but patrol vessels were badly needed to deal with threats from German submarines, and she was transferred to the U.S. Coast Guard that year for conversion to a patrol vessel. The United States Navy, which oversaw her conversion for the Coast Guard, made radical changes to the ship, lengthening her to 179 feet (55 meters) overall, removing her trawling equipment, and installing armament and other military equipment.

By the time the ship was commissioned into Coast Guard service as the patrol vessel USCGC Bellefonte (WYP-373), the first Coast Guard ship of the name, on 6 April 1944, the submarine threat had largely abated, and Bellefonte, although she had a maerform bow designed for icebreaking, lacked the stability to be used as the Coast Guard had intended. Her brief service as a Coast Guard vessel thus ended on 22 August 1944, when the Coast Guard decommissioned her. The Coast Guard transferred her back to the Fish and Wildlife Service that year.

== United States Fish and Wildlife Service career ==
Returning to the name Albatross III, the ship underwent another lengthy process of conversion to transform her from a patrol vessel into a fisheries research ship as previously intended. After this finally was completed, she was commissioned into service with the Fish and Wildlife Service as US FWS Albatross III on 19 March 1948 at the Boston Fish Pier in Boston, Massachusetts.

=== Fisheries research capabilities ===
Albatross III resembled a Boston trawler, with her deck fitted out in the standard Boston trawler layout, although she was much longer than most such ships. She had an electric trawl winch with 600 fathoms (3,600 feet; 1,100 meters) of 7/8-inch (2.22-cm) wire on each of its two drums, allowing her to trawl in waters up to 200 fathoms (1,200 feet; 370 meters) deep. She had a fish hold with a capacity of 50,000 pounds (22,680 kg) of fish on ice and two freezers, one of which could freeze fish quickly and maintain a temperature of minus 20 degrees F (minus 28.9 degrees C), while the other held temperatures at about 32 degrees F (0 degrees C).

Albatross III had two laboratories on her main deck just aft of the trawl winch. One, her wet laboratory, opened onto both the port and starboard decks through Dutch doors, had in its center a stainless steel sink suitable for handling and examining fish, and had two small sinks in cabinets on its outside bulkheads for chemical and hydrographic work. Her other laboratory, a dry laboratory, was aft of the wet laboratory and doubled as a library; it had a large work table, chairs, a bench, and shelves, and early in her career served as an office for scientists conducting the preliminary study of data collected at sea, although it later was filled with electronic equipment related to underwater television research.

The ship had hydrographic booms and winches on her bridge deck on both her port and starboard sides. The booms had mechanical travelers to which lowering blocks were attached which regulated the distance of the lowering wire from the rail.

Albatross III had accommodations for 35 personnel. Her standard complement was 21 (later reduced to 18) crew members and six scientists, and she had living quarters for an additional eight personnel, either additional crew members or additional scientists, as required on a particular voyage.

=== Service history ===
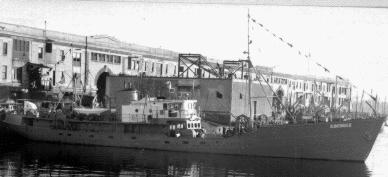
Albatross III tied up.

Albatross III's career focused on the fisheries and oceanography of the northwest Atlantic Ocean. Her first scientific cruise began on 17 May 1948, and she operated fairly consistently until September 1949 on survey work on the New England Banks, in experiments with the selectivity of various sizes of mesh in otter trawls to determine what sizes worked best to allow undersized fish to escape, and in hydrographic work on plankton. The Fish and Wildlife Service had hoped to exploit her fish hold by allowing her to harvest fish and bring them in for sale like a commercial trawler, with the proceeds going to defray some of the cost of operating her. This proved impractical, however, the idea was abandoned after her first few voyages, and financial shortfalls began to plague her operating schedule. In 1950 she had to suspend operations in September. In February 1951, the Fish and Wildlife Service loaned her to the Woods Hole Oceanographic Institution at Woods Hole, Massachusetts, for work under an Office of Naval Research contract, and this provided the funding to allow her to resume operations. In 1952 the Fish and Wildlife Service operated her itself under a similar contract. She finally returned to fisheries research in March 1953. She again ceased operations due to funding shortfalls in September 1953 and was tied up at Woods Hole.

In January 1954 the Fish and Wildlife Service obtained new funds for her operations, and Albatross III resumed fisheries research and operated continually until March 1959, coming under the control of the Fish and Wildlife Service's new Bureau of Commercial Fisheries as a result of a 1956 reorganization of the Fish and Wildlife Service's activities. During her active life she made 128 fisheries research and oceanographic cruises off New England and in adjacent areas. Much of her work related to the program of the International Commission for the Northwest Atlantic Fisheries, which was concerned with the regulation of the fisheries in the area, and made substantial contributions to the study of the use of the groundfish resources of the northwest Atlantic. Her work laid the foundation for a broader and more intensive program of investigation of the fisheries of the area, developing knowledge required for intelligent management of the fisheries, and improving understanding of the relation of environmental conditions to the productivity of the fishery resources in the area.

Faced with increasing maintenance and operational costs for the aging ship, the Bureau of Commercial Fisheries decommissioned Albatross III in March 1959. In November that year she was sold to the Island Steamship Line of Hyannis, Massachusetts, headed by Joseph T Gelinas.

== Later history and loss ==
By 1963 Albatross III had been renamed Nyleve in the ownership of Enos Shipping Corporation and registered in Panama.

On 28 March 1969 the ship was wrecked on Roman Key, Cuba.
