= Albatros (1912 automobile) =

The Albatros was a French automobile built by one Henri Villouin of Paris in 1912. His company made mostly cycles and motorcycles, but did build a light 4-cylinder car. Their advertisement boasted of "91 wins in 92 races", but this is thought to be referring to the cycles.
