= Albatros (1963 hydrofoil) =

Italian-built hydrofoil in used on Lake Geneva from 1964 to 1972

- Approximative outlines of Albatros

History

Switzerland
- Name: Albatros
- Namesake: Albatross
- Ordered: 10 May 1962
- Builder: Leopoldo Rodriquez, Messina
- Launched: 1963
- Decommissioned: between 1970 and 1972
- Fate: Sold

General characteristics
- Displacement: 24 tons
- Length: 20.90 m
- Beam: 7.40
- Draught: 2.40 m with hull submerged; 0.83 m on hydrofoils
- Installed power: 1350 shp
- Propulsion: Mercedes-Benz engine

Albatros was an Italian-built hydrofoil in service with the Compagnie générale de navigation sur le lac Léman (CGN), commissioned for Expo 64. After initial success, technical difficulties and a flagging number of users led to her decommissioning. She was then sold to a French company in 1972.

== History ==
In the early 1960, the imminence of Expo 64 led to a number of engineering projects being started in the vicinity of Lausanne. In the contexte, the Compagnie générale de navigation sur le lac Léman (CGN), which operates both historical steam paddle ships and modern liners on the Lake of Geneva, was studying the commissioning of a modern unit. On 10 May 1962, its extraordinary assembly of shareholders decided on ordering a hydrofoil. The chosen design was by Leopoldo Rodriquez, from Messina, for a 1.2 million CHF budget.

Albatros was built during the year 1963. On 8 February 1964, she departed Messina for her maiden journey to Marseille, thus becoming the first CGN ship sailing the open sea. Upon arriving in Marseille, she was lifted on a truck and brought to Lausanne by road.

On 16 April, Albatros was put in service as a shuttle on the Vidy-Évian line. Her draft would prevent from entering the roads of Geneva in most conditions. In 1970, due to a diminishing public, CGN decided to sell Albatros.

In 1972, Albatros was sold to a company of Lavandou.

== Bibliography ==
- Jacques Christinat, Bateaux du Léman, deux siècles de Navigation, collection Archives vivantes, Éditions Cabédita, Yens-sur-Morges, 1991, ISBN 2-88295-061-6, pp. 196–197
