= Albatross (novel) =

2019 novel by Terry Fallis

- First edition
- Author: Terry Fallis
- Publisher: McClelland & Stewart
- Publication date: August 2019

Albatross is the seventh novel by Canadian author Terry Fallis. It was published in August 2019. It earned a place on The Globe and Mail's bestseller list a week after publication.

== Plot ==
Hero Adam Coryell unexpectedly finds himself to be a golf prodigy. Unfortunately he wants to be a writer, and he hates golf.

== Reviews ==
The Globe and Mail's review asserted "This novel has a fable-like quality and philosophical depths that Fallis plumbs with a deceptive subtlety – you’ll come for the story about an athletic whiz kid, and leave contemplating where true happiness really lies, both in Adam’s life and your own."
