= Albatros (1922 automobile) =

English automobile

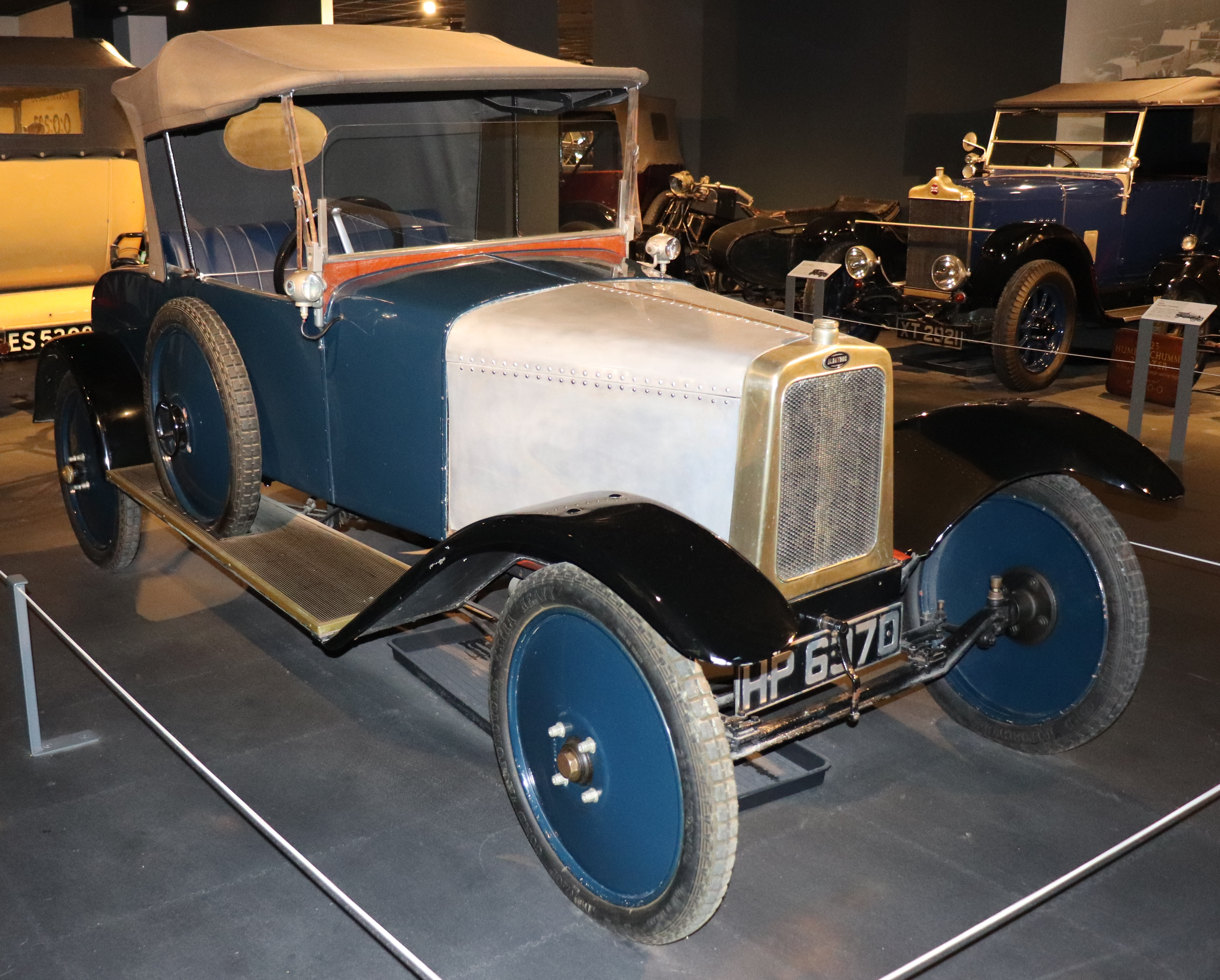
1923 Albatros

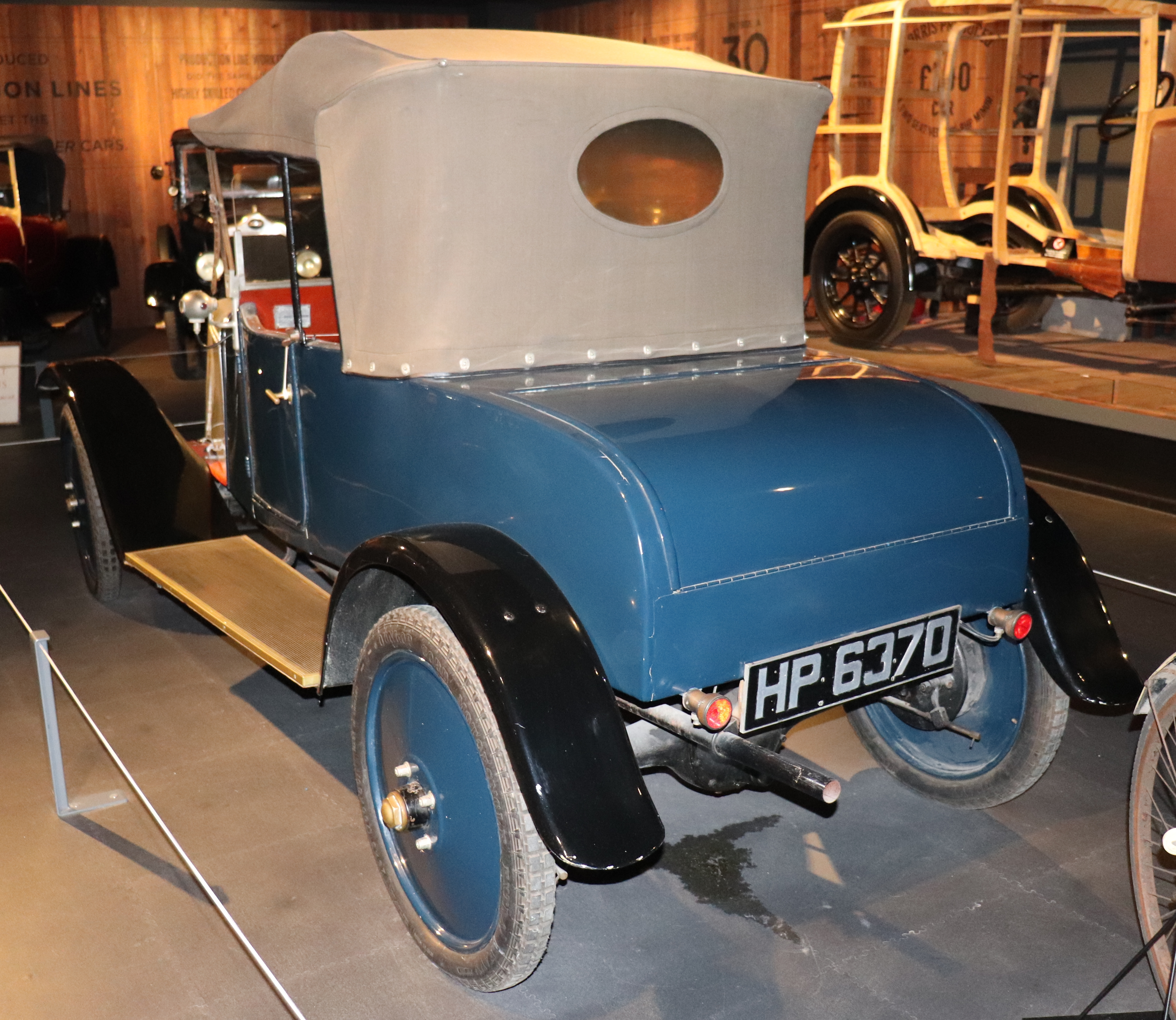
Rear

The Albatros was an English automobile manufactured in Croft Road, Coventry and founded in 1922 by H.T.W. Manwaring. The origin of the name is reputed to be derived from a play on the name of one Albert Ross, who was Manwaring's mentor and boss earlier in his career.

There were two models, an 8 and a 10 hp, both using side-valve Coventry-Climax engines.

The 1247 cc 10 hp was sold in two versions. The Utility model had a three-speed gearbox and shaft drive to a rear axle with no differential and rear-wheel brakes only. It was only available with open two-seat coachwork and cost £200. The Special Touring model was similar in mechanical specification but did have a differential and electric starting and was available with a variety of bodies including closed saloons or as chassis only. It cost between £190 (chassis only) and £275 for the 2-seat coupe.

In late 1923 the 10 hp was joined by a smaller 1094 cc 8 hp with 2-seat body at £165 or a sports model at £190.

In 1924 the company appears to have been in financial difficulties and moved to new premises at Bedford Street, Coventry. A new car was launched still rated at 10 hp but with a larger 1368 cc engine still by Coventry-Climax and priced at £210 but they failed to take a stand at the London Motor Show that year and the company seems to have been declared bankrupt at the end of the year.

Only a few cars were ever made and it is thought that only two survive.

There was also an Albatros company based in Paris, France, who made motor cycles and cars in 1912.

== See also ==
- List of car manufacturers of the United Kingdom
