= Albatross (magazine) =

American lesbian magazine

- Editor: Stacey M. Franchild
- Categories: Lesbian
- Frequency: Biannual
- Circulation: 5,000
- Publisher: The Albatross Collective
- Founded: 1974; 52 years ago
- First issue: October 1974
- Country: United States
- Based in: East Orange, New Jersey
- Language: English
- OCLC: 428434105

Albatross was an American lesbian satirical magazine published monthly for the first 6 issues, then quarterly for the next 2 years. In its final year only two issues were produced. It was produced by The Albatross Collective (TAC), which was based in East Orange, New Jersey. Usually subtitled as The Lesbian Feminist Satire Magazine, issues featured prose, poems, comics, and advertisements. The first issue of Albatross was published in October 1974.

== History ==
Albatross was founded by former members of the Mid-East Jersey National Organization for Women (NOW) chapter, who left due to homophobic views and discrimination from members of other local and nationwide NOW chapters. The decision was announced in the final issue of their newsletter, Sisterhood - The Mid-East Jersey NOW News, published in June 1974. Stacey M. Franchild, the president of Mid-East Jersey NOW wrote, “As we as people still have information to impart, and must have a means of doing so, though not through the structure of NOW, we shall disseminate our information through the newsletter of another group…the Mid-East Jersey Radical Feminists. The newsletter shall be entitled the ALBATROSS…and NOW may certainly come to think of it as that.”

In October 1974, the first issue of Albatross was published. The magazine was edited by Stacey M. Franchild. The first issues were created on a mimeograph machine. The Collective hand assembled and stapled the early issues. When we had enough money, Stacey used an IBM Selectric typewriter to produce printer ready copy. She always prioritized unpublished authors and refused submissions that had already been published elsewhere. Her reasoning was simple, she wanted to create a platform for new voices. In addition to editing, she created the 'JC on a Bike', 'Betty Frypan' and 'The Roommates' comic series with her partner, V.E Bass. Stacey also wrote the 'Helps & Advices' and 'Little Mary Sunshine' columns. The 'Tross was collectively written and produced by members of the Mid-East Jersey Radical Feminists. The first issue described their mission, "We hope to share with you through the ALBATROSS, some of our experiences, feelings, humor, anger and day to day living." Issues were published on a quarterly basis until 1978. To save money and time editing, TAC changed to publishing larger issues twice a year.

== See also ==
- Lesbian Connection
