= Albatross (cloth) =

Lightweight, soft material with a napped and slightly creped surface

Albatross is a lightweight, soft material with a napped and slightly creped surface. It has the worsted appearance.

== Name ==
The fabric is called "Albatross" because it has a similar texture to Albatross's breast.

== Weave ==
Albatross is made of wool or blends, and it may be in plain or twill, both with a loose weave.

== Use ==
Albatross is used in making soft clothes such as clothes for infants and negligees.
