= Albatross Marine =

British speedboat manufacturer

Albatross Marine (1949–1966) was a British manufacturer of very light aluminium speedboats primarily used for Water skiing on lakes. The company was created by two English engineers, Peter Hives (son of the Rolls-Royce Limited director of that time, Lord Hives), and Archie Peace (an aeronautics engineer trained up by the Bristol Aeroplane Company), in St. Olaves (Great Yarmouth, England). Albatross marine has run from Bosham in West Sussex since 2009.

By applying the techniques they knew and using the after-war surplus of aluminium, they created the first Albatross Mk1 runabout in 1949.

Names of owners included Stirling Moss, Brigitte Bardot, George Formby, Prince Rainier of Monaco (owner of six craft), Prince Philip and Jon Pertwee.

Around 1300 Albatross were built, from which 800 two-seaters (715 MkI/2/3), and 267 four-seaters.

Only 164 models were equipped with the Coventry Climax engine, which make them the most valuable ones today, because of their higher power output.

Standard sports and super Sports Runabout were the first two models that shared the same hull design. Serial number 0 to 241

The Sports Runabout model was a 2-seater speedboat, 12 ft 9 inch long powered by a marinised Ford Prefect engine of 1172cc. It could reach speeds of 30.5 mph.

The Standard sport version had a E93A engine single carburettor no bow light and simple seats cushions.

The Super Sport fitted with an E93A engine had twin carburetters and an alloy Aquaplane head for extra power. It came with bullfrog nav light and more detailed seat cushions. Both models were offered with the albatross gearbox.

The Mark III model was the same hull design as the earlier boat but albatross increased the thickness of the hull to make the boat more robust but as it was a little heavier the Mk3 was in fact slower than previous models. The Mk3 was fitted with the later ford 100e engine and some of the boats were fitted with a Shorrocks super charger and an albatross gearbox.

== A Series ==
The A Series model was a 2-seater speedboat, fitted with Ford1500 precrossflow or Coventry Climax engines. The Coventry Climax engined boats could reach 47 mph. one hundred and five of these were built.

A Continental 4 seater hull started life as a third scale model of Albatross's biggest boat Gay Jane a 53 foot sports fisherman. There are three hull model types the Mk1 fitted with a Ford 100e or a climax 1220cc. The Mk1.2 fitted with the Ford 1500cc Pre crossflow or Coventry Climax 1220cc and the Mk2 that again had either a Ford 1500cc Pre crosflow or Coventry Climax 1220cc The Mk1.2 and Mk2 have wider bearers in the hull to accommodate the Ford 1500cc Precrossflow and the Mk2 has a rear end much like an A series.

== Alpine ==
The Albatross slipper stern was not a great seller for albatross with only about 30 being made. Most were 4-seaters but a there are six 2-seaters Corsair models also built. Both of these boats were based on the continental hull and the boat only changes aft of the passenger seats in the four seater. They have the steering wheel on the left of the cockpit so that the weight of the driver counterbalanced the rotation of the engine as it is the only albatross with the engine fitted the other way round; the engine power take-off was at the rear of the engine, not at the "front" of a reversed engine. The 4-seaters also have an additional hump in the engine cover to accommodate the Sunbeam engine.

While most were fitted with a 1,592cc 4-cylinder Sunbeam engine, the first Corsair was first of all fitted with a Mercedes engine that was not a success. There was also a trial of a climax FPF 2.0L in a four seater. The Sunbeam Alpine Marine engines can be recognised by having twin Zenith carburettors although the first engine was fitted with su carbs. The water tank is found on the top of the engine in the four seater and behind the seat in the Corsair

The prototype has hull number 2000 and the highest hull number so far found is 2026.
