= USS Patuxent (AT-11) =

Minesweeper of the United States Navy

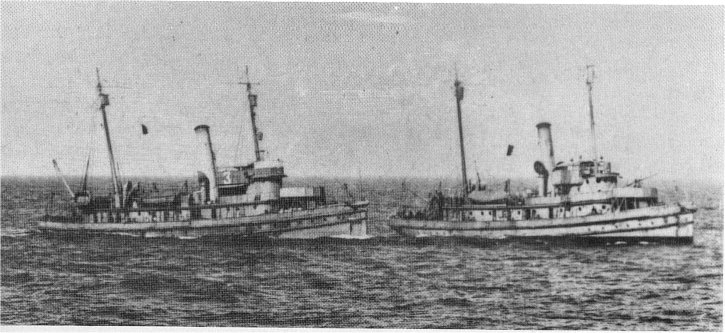
- USS Patapsco, left, and USS Patuxent, right, participate in minesweeping operations in the North Sea in 1919. They would be designated AT-10 and AT-11 in the United States Navy's new hull code system the following year.

History

United States
- Name: USS Patuxent (Fleet Tug No. 11)
- Namesake: The Patuxent River in Maryland
- Builder: Norfolk Navy Yard, Portsmouth, Virginia
- Laid down: 25 July 1907
- Launched: 16 May 1908
- Commissioned: 4 May 1909
- Decommissioned: 30 September 1924
- Reclassified: Fleet tug, AT-11, 17 July 1920
- Fate: Transferred to U.S. Bureau of Fisheries 1926
- Acquired: Transferred from U.S. Bureau of Fisheries 1934
- Stricken: 29 June 1938
- Fate: Sold 16 March 1939

U.S. Bureau of Fisheries
- Name: USFS Albatross II
- Namesake: USFC Albatross, a famed fisheries research ship in service with the U.S. Commission of Fish and Fisheries and the U.S. Bureau of Fisheries from 1882 to 1898, 1898 to 1917, and 1919 to 1921
- Acquired: 1926
- Commissioned: 1926
- Decommissioned: 30 June 1932
- Identification: WTDA
- Fate: Transferred to U.S. Navy 1934

General characteristics (as U.S. Navy vessel)
- Type: Tug
- Tonnage: 521 GRT
- Displacement: 755 tons
- Length: 148 ft (45 m)
- Beam: 29 ft 1/2 in (8.852 m)
- Draft: 12 ft 3 in (3.73 m)
- Speed: 13 knots (24 km/h; 15 mph)
- Complement: 51
- Armament: two 3-pounder guns

The first USS Patuxent (Fleet Tug No. 11, later AT-11) was a fleet tug in commission in the United States Navy from 1909 to 1924. She served the United States Atlantic Fleet and saw service in World War I. After the end of her Navy career, she was in commission in the United States Bureau of Fisheries from 1926 to 1932 as the fisheries research ship USFS Albatross II.

== Construction and commissioning ==
Patuxent, the first U.S. Navy ship to bear that name, was a two-masted, steel-hulled, sea-going tug, laid down on 25 July 1907 by the Norfolk Navy Yard at Portsmouth, Virginia, and launched on 16 May 1908. She was commissioned on 4 May 1909 as USS Patuxent (Fleet Tug No. 11).

== United States Navy service ==
Patuxent spent her naval career operating with the U.S. Atlantic Fleet, providing the services of a sea-going tug to diverse elements of the fleet. She served during World War I, and in the aftermath of the war was outfitted as a minesweeper and took part in 1919 in the sweeping of the North Sea Mine Barrage. When the U.S. Navy adopted its modern hull code system on 17 July 1920, she was redesignated USS Patuxent (AT-11).

The Navy decommissioned Patuxent on 30 September 1924.

== United States Bureau of Fisheries ==
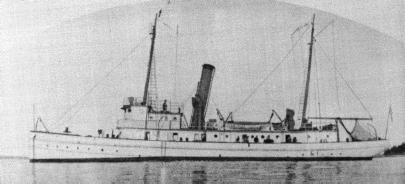
USFS Albatross II

In January 1926, the United States Bureau of Fisheries (BOF) decommissioned the fisheries research ship USFS Fish Hawk and required a replacement. Accordingly, the United States Department of Commerce acquired Patuxent from the Navy that year and assigned her to the BOF to replace Fish Hawk.

Upon taking possession of Patuxent, 'the BOF renamed her Albatross II and described her as a two-masted, 521-gross-ton, steel-hulled steamer with an iron deck overlaid with wood, a length overall of 156 feet (47.5 m), a beam of 29 feet 6 inches (9.0 m), and a mean draft of 12 feet 3 inches (3.7 m). She had a radio antenna strung between her masts, a cargo boom attached to her mainmast over her deckhouse, a steam steering engine, a steam windlass, a steam capstan, an evaporator, a 1,000-US-gallon (3,800 L; 830 imp gal) distiller, a radio, two electric generators, electric lighting, and two searchlights. Her propulsion plant consisted of two vertical triple-expansion steam engines with a combined output of 1,160 horsepower (981 kilowatts) and two single-end Scotch marine boilers. When transferred to the BOF, her hull, deckhouses, bulwarks, and boats were painted white and her masts, funnel, davits, and ventilator cowls and the trim on her deckhouses were buff. The BOF made plans to modify her extensively to provide quarters for a crew of 26, ample accommodations for embarked scientists, and a large laboratory, and to install oceanographic and collection equipment aboard her. The BOF had high hopes for Albatross II, describing her in mid-1926 as "an excellent ocean-going vessel" that would "fill the bureau′s requirements for many years as efficiently and more economically than either of her predecessors," a reference to both Fish Hawk and the research vessel USFS Albatross, which the BOF had decommissioned in 1921.

After the crew of the BOF research vessel USFS Halcyon reconditioned Albatross II at the Portsmouth Navy Yard in Kittery, Maine, during February 1926, the BOF commissioned her into service in 1926 as USFS Albatross II. Assigned to take over fishery and oceanographic efforts in and around the Gulf of Maine previously performed by Halcyon – which had been laid up pending condemnation and sale – Albatross II put to sea in early August 1926 on her first scientific voyage. Before fiscal year 1927 ended on 30 June 1927, she had steamed 4,921 nautical miles (9,114 km; 5,663 mi), made observations at 69 oceanographic stations, and tagged 7,785 fishes.

Albatross II made a total of nine scientific cruises during fiscal year 1928 (1 July 1927–30 June 1928), engaging in fishery investigation work in waters from Mount Desert, Maine, to the Virginia Capes. On two of the voyages – one to Massachusetts Bay and one to the area of the North Atlantic Ocean south of Cape Cod, Massachusetts – she conducted tow netting to establish the abundance of eggs and larvae of the Atlantic mackerel and gathered data on water temperatures and currents as part of an investigation under the guidance of Oscar Elton Sette of the biology of the Atlantic mackerel and the factors leading to its success or failure in seasonal spawning. In August 1927, she' made a cruise to Georges Bank, where she tagged 940 cod, 24 pollock, and 595 haddock so that their migration patterns could be studied. In March and April 1928 she was on loan to the New York Zoological Society for an expedition to the Galápagos Islands in the Pacific Ocean, where expedition members obtained over 100 Galápagos tortoises, which Albatross II transported to the United States for a breeding program to preserve the endangered species. In the spring of 1928 she made a cruise to the waters of the North Atlantic Ocean off New Jersey to tag cod, pollock, and haddock, but had disappointing results. In all, Albatross II steamed 13,835 nautical miles (25,622 km; 15,921 mi) and tagged 7,417 fish during fiscal year 1928.

Albatross II logged another 11,341 nautical miles (21,004 km; 13,051 mi) during fiscal year 1929, which began on 1 July 1928. From 1 July to 28 November 1928, she conducted fishery investigations and fish-tagging operations on fishing grounds from the Cholera Bank off New York to Roseway Bank off Nova Scotia, Canada, tagging 4,257 fish. She underwent repairs at the Boston Navy Yard in Boston, Massachusetts, from 1 December 1928 to 18 February 1929, then returned to fishery work, supporting Sette′s Atlantic mackerel research and making one fish-tagging cruise before the fiscal year ended on 30 June 1929. She ran four lines of drift bottles to study currents during the fiscal year.

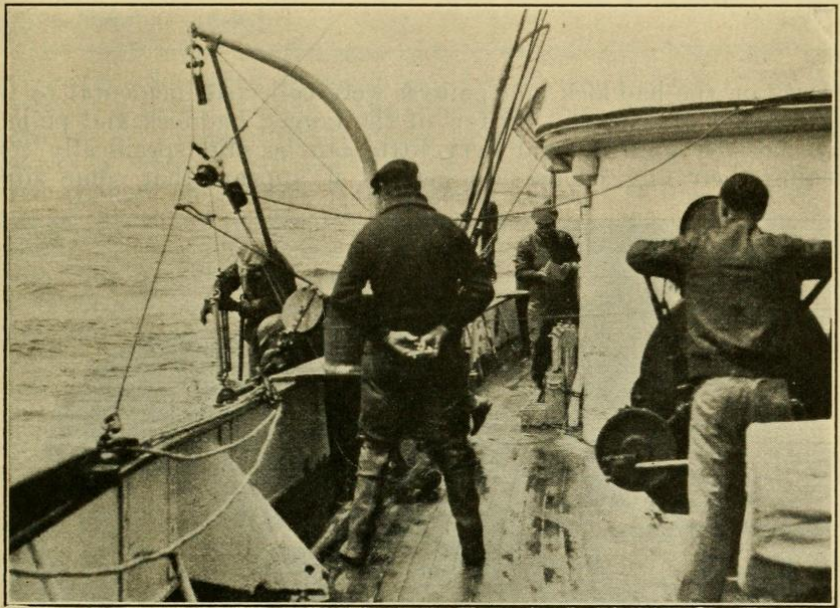
Taking a seawater sample aboard USFS Albatross II during fiscal year 1930 (1 July 1929–30 June 1930).

Based at Woods Hole, Massachusetts, during fiscal year 1930, which began on 1 July 1929, Albatross II logged 13,017 nautical miles (24,107 km; 14,980 mi) before the fiscal year ended on 30 June 1930. Pump problems forced her to abort a cruise she attempted from the continental shelf off the United States East Coast to Bermuda, but otherwise she operated along the U.S. East Coast from Cape Ann, Massachusetts, to Cape Hatteras, North Carolina, making observations at 273 oceanographic stations ranging from a few nautical miles to 180 nautical miles (330 km; 210 mi) offshore.

Albatross II operated on the continental shelf between Cape Hatteras and Cape Sable Island, Nova Scotia, during fiscal year 1931 (1 July 1930–30 June 1931) under Sette′s direction. She made numerous 30-foot (9.1 m) and 60-foot (18 m) otter trawls, took readings at 286 oceanographic stations, and tagged 352 cod, 280 haddock, 33 pollock, and a combined total of 248 butterfish, croakers, flukes, sea bass, and scups. She continued to work between Cape Sable Island and Cape Hatteras under Sette′s direction during fiscal year 1932, which began on 1 July 1931, but as the Great Depression deepened, severe cuts in the appropriation of funds for BOF ship operations forced the BOF to decommission Albatross II as the fiscal year ended on 30 June 1932, and she was laid up at the BOF station at Woods Hole.

Albatross II did not return to service. The aging ship required a great deal of maintenance, and by the time the BOF decommissioned her in 1932 most of the funds allocated to operating her had to be spent on repairs. Deeming her no longer economically practical to operate and not suited to the BOF's needs, and with no prospect of receiving appropriations with which to repair and operate her, the BOF returned the ship to the U.S. Navy in 1934.

Although Albatross II did not fulfill the hope the BOF expressed in 1926 that she could serve its needs for many years to come, she did provide important service during her six years on fisheries research duties, surveying the fishing grounds off New England and studying the biology of some of the more commercially valuable marine species of the area. Albatross II's collecting of marine species supported important studies of haddock eggs and larvae by Lionel A. Walford and plankton by Henry B. Bigelow and Mary Sears, and while studying Atlantic mackerel biology aboard her between 1926 and 1932, Oscar Elton Sette pioneered the computation of population estimates of larval fish growth and mortality rates. In addition, William C. Herrington experimented aboard Albatross II with "savings gear," large mesh nets designed to permit the escape of undersized fishes through the otter trawls as a way of helping to preserve the fish population; these and later experiments laid the foundation for mesh regulations established later for commercial fishing in the northwestern Atlantic Ocean.

Albatross II was the last United States Government fisheries research ship in commission until March 1948, when the BOF's successor organization, the United States Department of the Interior′s Fish and Wildlife Service (which in 1956 became the United States Fish and Wildlife Service) commissioned the research ship US FWS Albatross III.

== Final disposition ==
The ship was stricken from the Navy List on 29 June 1938. She was sold on 16 March 1939.

== Bibliography ==
- Day, Albert M., "The Fish and Wildlife Service — Ten Years of Progress," Commercial Fisheries Review, March 1950.
- Eger, Christopher L. (March 2021). "Hudson Fulton Celebration, Part II". Warship International. LVIII (1): 58–81. ISSN 0043-0374.
