= German trawler V 401 Jan Mayen =

German naval vessel

History
- Name: Jan Mayen (1938–44); Cap Nord (1946–60); s'Gravenhage (1960–67); Vertrouwen (1967–71); Albatros (1971–74); Laga (1974–82); Felicitas II (1982– )
- Namesake: Jan Mayen (1938–44); 's-Gravenhage (1960–67)
- Owner: Norddeutsche Hochseefischerei AG. (1938–39); Kriegsmarine (1939–44); Société Fécampoise de Peche to Fécamp (1946-60); D. Joh. Krijger (1960–66); Rotterdamsche Hypotheekbank (1966–67); N.H. Reederei v/h Frank Volijk (1967-74); J. H. Bootsma (1974); Al-Tros S.A. (1974–82); Copania Extre S.A. (1982– )
- Port of registry: (Nazi Germany) Wesermünde, Germany (1934–39); Kriegsmarine (1939–44); Fécamp, France (1946–60); IJmuiden, Netherlands (1960-67); (Netherlands) Scheveningen, Netlerlands (1967–74); Panama City, Panama (1974– )
- Builder: Deschimag Seebeckwerft
- Yard number: 620
- Launched: 29 September 1938
- Completed: November 1938
- Commissioned: 23 September 1939
- Out of service: 1944–46
- Identification: Fishing boat registration PG 544 (1938–39); Code Letters DFEH; Pennant Number V 406 (1939); Pennant Number V 401 (1939–44); Fishing boat registration F 1025 (1946–60); Fishing boat registration IJM 26 (1960–67); Fishing boat registration SCH 73 (1967–71); Fishing boat registration SCH 97 (1971–74)

General characteristics
- Type: Fishing trawler (1934–39); Vorpostenboot (1939–44); Fishing trawler (1946–71); Cargo ship (1974– )
- Tonnage: 654 GRT, 246 NRT (1938–44); 694 GRT (1946– )
- Length: 61.45 metres (201 ft 7 in)
- Beam: 8.53 metres (28 ft 0 in)
- Draught: 5.03 metres (16 ft 6 in)
- Depth: 4.43 metres (14 ft 6 in)
- Installed power: Triple expansion steam engine, 132nhp (1938–57); Diesel engine (1957– )
- Propulsion: Single screw propeller
- Speed: 12.5 knots (23.2 km/h)

Jan Mayen was a German fishing trawler that was requisitioned by the Kriegsmarine in World War II for use as a Vorpostenboot. She served as V 406 Jan Mayen and V 401 Jan Mayen. She was sunk at Bayonne, France in August 1944. Post-war, she was refloated and entered French merchant service as Cap Nord. She was sold to the Netherlands in 1960, serving as s'Gravenhage, then Albatros. Converted to a cargo ship, she was sold to Panama 1974 and renamed Laga. She was renamed Felicitas II in 1982.

== Description ==
As built, Jan Mayen was 61.45 metres (201 ft 7 in) long, with a beam of 8.53 metres (28 ft 0 in). She had a depth of 4.43 metres (14 ft 6 in) and a draught of 5.03 metres (16 ft 6 in). She was assessed at 654 GRT, 246 NRT. She was powered by a triple expansion steam engine, which had cylinders of 37.9 centimetres (14 15/16 in), 61 centimetres (24 in) and 100 centimetres (39 3/8 in) diameter by 66 centimetres (26 in) stroke. The engine was made by Deschimag Seebeckwerft, Wesermünde, Germany. It was rated at 132nhp. The engine powered a single screw propeller driven via a low pressure turbine, double reduction gearing and a hydraulic coupling. It could propel the ship at 12.5 knots (23.2 km/h).

== History ==
The ship was built as yard number 620 by Deschimag Seekbeckwerft, Wesermünde for the Norddeutsche Hochseefischerei AG, Wesermünde. She was launched on 29 September 1938 and completed in November. The fishing boat registration PG 500 was allocated. She was allocated the Code Letters DFEH.

Jan Mayen was requisitioned by the Kriegsmarine on 23 September 1939 for use as a vorpostenboot. She was allocated to 4 Vorpostenflotille as V 406 Jan Mayen. On 16 October she was redesignated V 401 Jan Mayen On 22 August 1944, she was sunk off Bayonne, Basses-Pyrénées, France.

Jan Mayen was refloated post-war, returning to merchant service as the French fishing boat Cap Nord under the registration F 1025. She was owned by the Société Fécampoise de Peche to Fécamp, Fécamp, Seine-Inférieure. She was now assessed at 694 GRT. In 1957, she was rebuilt in Amsterdam, Netherlands and fitted with a 6-cylinder diesel engine. She was sold to D. Joh. Krijger, Ijmuiden, Netherlands in 1960 and renamed s'Gravenhage. The registration IJM 26 was allocated. In 1966, ownership passed to the Rotterdamsche Hypotheekbank. In 1967, she was sold to the N.V. Reederei v/h Frank Vrolijk, Scheveningen and renamed Vertrouwen, with the registration SCH 73. She was renamed Albatros in 1971 and her registration was changed to SCH 95. She was later converted to a cargo ship. In 1974, she was sold to J. B. Bootsma. He sold Albatros to Al-Tros S.A., Panama and she was renamed Laga. She was sold to Copania Extre, Panama and renamed Felicitas II in 1982.

== Sources ==
- Gröner, Erich (1993). Die deutschen Kriegsschiffe 1815-1945 (in German). Vol. 8/I: Flußfahrzeuge, Ujäger, Vorpostenboote, Hilfsminensucher, Küstenschutzverbände (Teil 1). Koblenz: Bernard & Graefe. ISBN 3-7637-4807-5.
